= History of private equity and venture capital =

The history of private equity, venture capital, and the development of these asset classes has occurred through a series of boom-and-bust cycles since the middle of the 20th century. Within the broader private equity industry, two distinct sub-industries, leveraged buyouts and venture capital experienced growth along parallel, although interrelated tracks.

Since the origins of the modern private equity industry in 1946, there have been four major epochs marked by three boom and bust cycles. The early history of private equity—from 1946 through 1981—was characterized by relatively small volumes of private equity investment, rudimentary firm organizations and limited awareness of and familiarity with the private equity industry. The first boom and bust cycle, from 1982 through 1993, was characterized by the dramatic surge in leveraged buyout activity financed by junk bonds and culminating in the massive buyout of RJR Nabisco before the near collapse of the leveraged buyout industry in the late 1980s and early 1990s. The second boom and bust cycle (from 1992 through 2002) emerged from the ashes of the savings and loan crisis, the insider trading scandals, the real estate market collapse and the recession of the early 1990s. This period saw the emergence of more institutionalized private equity firms, ultimately culminating in the massive dot-com bubble in 1999 and 2000. The third boom and bust cycle (from 2003 through 2007) came in the wake of the collapse of the dot-com bubble—leveraged buyouts reach unparalleled size and the institutionalization of private equity firms is exemplified by the Blackstone Group's 2007 initial public offering.

In its early years through to roughly the year 2000, the private equity and venture capital asset classes were primarily active in the United States. With the second private equity boom in the mid-1990s and liberalization of regulation for institutional investors in Europe, a mature European private equity market emerged.

== Pre-WWII ==
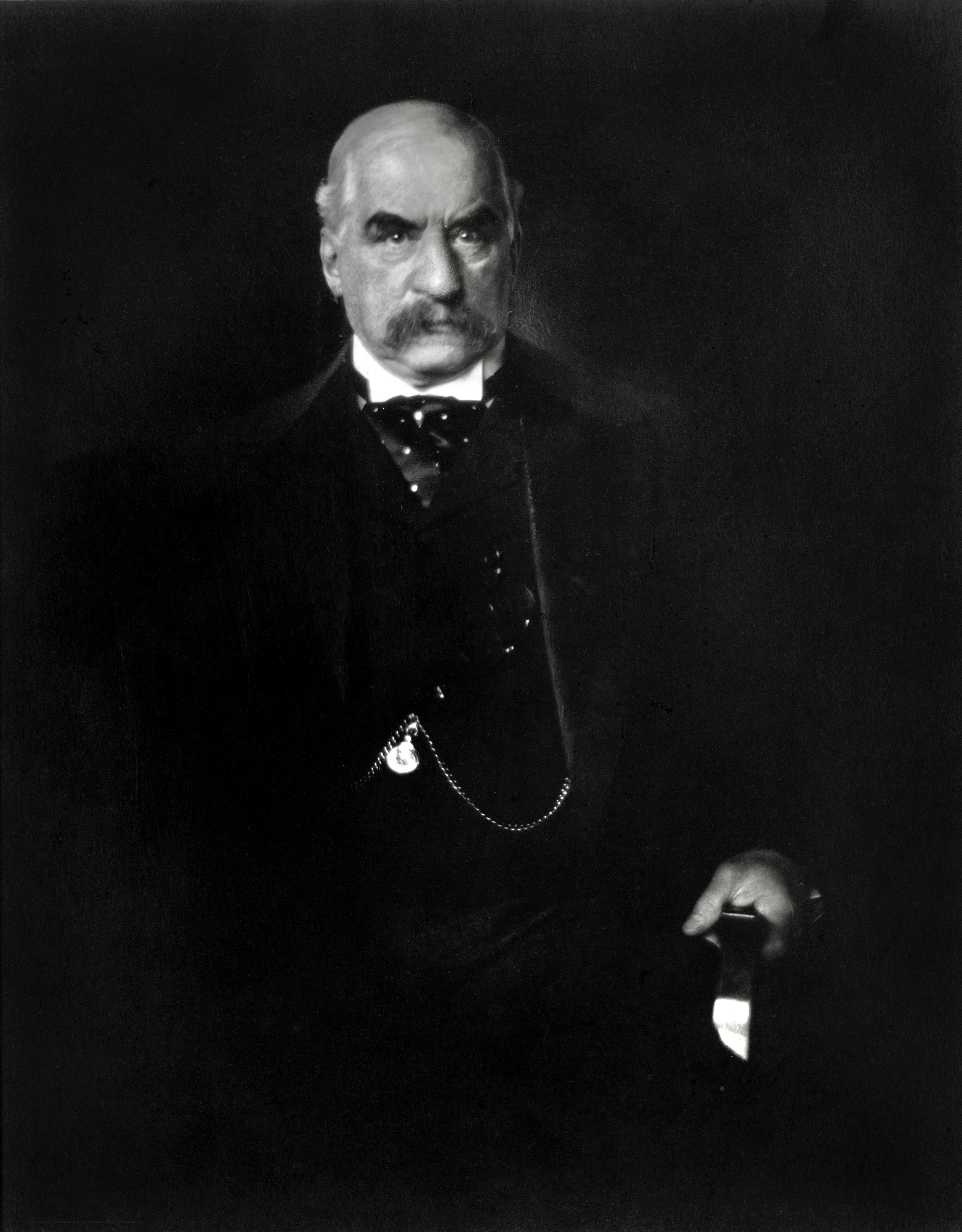
J.P. Morgan's acquisition of Carnegie Steel Company in 1901 represents arguably the first true modern buyout.

Investors have been acquiring businesses and making minority investments in privately held companies since the dawn of the Industrial Revolution. Merchant bankers in London and Paris financed industrial concerns in the 1850s; most notably Crédit Mobilier, founded in 1854 by Jacob and Isaac Pereire, who together with New York-based Jay Cooke financed the United States Transcontinental Railroad.

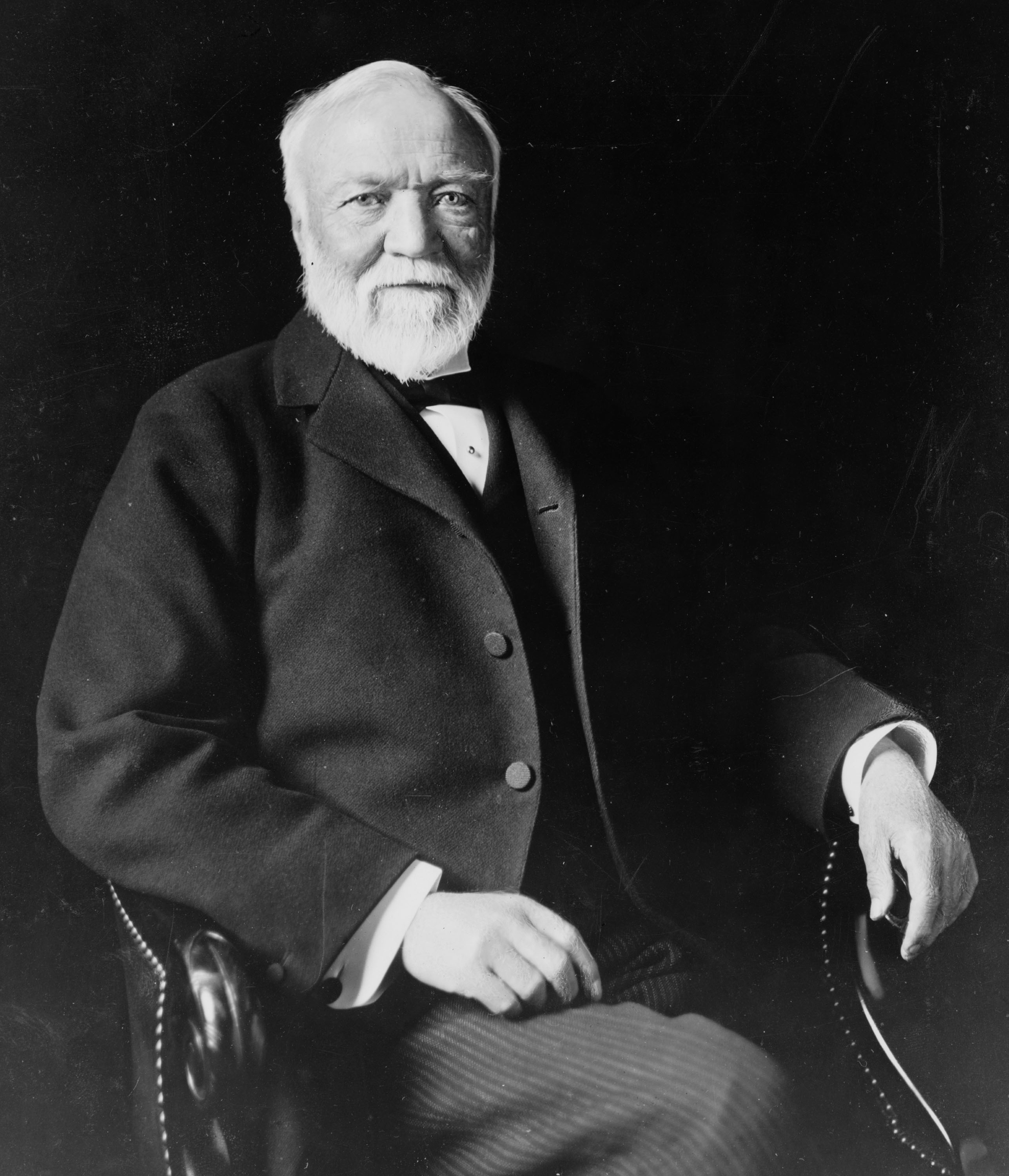
Andrew Carnegie sold his steel company to J.P. Morgan in 1901 in arguably the first true modern buyout.

Later, J. Pierpont Morgan's J.P. Morgan & Co. would finance railroads and other industrial companies throughout the United States. In certain respects, J. Pierpont Morgan's 1901 acquisition of Carnegie Steel Company from Andrew Carnegie and Henry Phipps for $480 million represents the first true major buyout as they are thought of today.

Due to structural restrictions imposed on American banks under the Glass–Steagall Act and other regulations in the 1930s, there was no private merchant banking industry in the United States, a situation that was quite exceptional in developed nations. As late as the 1980s, Lester Thurow, a noted economist, decried the inability of the financial regulation framework in the United States to support merchant banks. US investment banks were confined primarily to advisory businesses, handling mergers and acquisitions transactions and placements of equity and debt securities. Investment banks would later enter the space, however long after independent firms had become well established.

With few exceptions, private equity in the first half of the 20th century was the domain of wealthy individuals and families. The Vanderbilts, Whitneys, Rockefellers and Warburgs were notable investors in private companies in the first half of the century. In 1938, Laurance S. Rockefeller helped finance the creation of both Eastern Air Lines and Douglas Aircraft and the Rockefeller family had vast holdings in a variety of companies. Eric M. Warburg founded E.M. Warburg & Co. in 1938, which would ultimately become Warburg Pincus, with investments in both leveraged buyouts and venture capital.

== Origins after WWII ==
It was not until after World War II that what is considered today to be true private equity investments began to emerge marked by the founding of the first two venture capital firms in 1946: American Research and Development Corporation (ARD) and J.H. Whitney & Company.

ARD was founded by Georges Doriot, the "father of venture capitalism" (founder of INSEAD and former dean of Harvard Business School), with Ralph Flanders and Karl Compton (former president of MIT), to encourage private sector investments in businesses run by soldiers who were returning from World War II. ARD's significance was primarily that it was the first institutional private equity investment firm that raised capital from sources other than wealthy families although it had several notable investment successes as well. ARD is credited with the first major venture capital success story when its 1957 investment of $70,000 in Digital Equipment Corporation (DEC) would be valued at over $35.5 million after the company's initial public offering in 1968 (representing a return of over 500 times on its investment and an annualized rate of return of 101%). Former employees of ARDC went on to found several prominent venture capital firms including Greylock Partners (founded in 1965 by Charlie Waite and Bill Elfers) and Morgan, Holland Ventures, the predecessor of Flagship Ventures (founded in 1982 by James Morgan). ARD continued investing until 1971 with the retirement of Doriot. In 1972, Doriot merged ARD with Textron after having invested in over 150 companies.

J.H. Whitney & Company was founded by John Hay Whitney and his partner Benno Schmidt. Whitney had been investing since the 1930s, founding Pioneer Pictures in 1933 and acquiring a 15% interest in Technicolor Corporation with his cousin Cornelius Vanderbilt Whitney. By far, Whitney's most famous investment was in Florida Foods Corporation. The company, having developed an innovative method for delivering nutrition to American soldiers, later came to be known as Minute Maid orange juice and was sold to The Coca-Cola Company in 1960. J.H. Whitney & Company continues to make investments in leveraged buyout transactions and raised $750 million for its sixth institutional private equity fund in 2005.

Before World War II, venture capital investments (originally known as "development capital") were primarily the domain of wealthy individuals and families. One of the first steps toward a professionally managed venture capital industry was the passage of the Small Business Investment Act of 1958. The 1958 Act officially allowed the U.S. Small Business Administration (SBA) to license private "Small Business Investment Companies" (SBICs) to help the financing and management of the small entrepreneurial businesses in the United States. Passage of the Act addressed concerns raised in a Federal Reserve Board report to Congress that concluded that a major gap existed in the capital markets for long-term funding for growth-oriented small businesses. It was thought that fostering entrepreneurial companies would spur technological advances to compete against the Soviet Union. Facilitating the flow of capital through the economy up to the pioneering small concerns in order to stimulate the U.S. economy was and still is the main goal of the SBIC program today. The 1958 Act provided venture capital firms structured either as SBICs or Minority Enterprise Small Business Investment Companies (MESBICs) access to federal funds which could be leveraged at a ratio of up to 4:1 against privately raised investment funds. The success of the Small Business Administration's efforts are viewed primarily in terms of the pool of professional private equity investors that the program developed as the rigid regulatory limitations imposed by the program minimized the role of SBICs. In 2005, the SBA significantly reduced its SBIC program, though SBICs continue to make private equity investments.

The real growth in Private Equity surged in 1984 to 1991 period when Institutional Investors, e.g. Pension Plans, Foundations and Endowment Funds such as the Shell Pension Plan, the Oregon State Pension Plan, the Ford Foundation and the Harvard Endowment Fund started investing a small part of their trillion dollars portfolios into Private Investments - particularly venture capital and Leverage Buyout Funds.

== Growth of Silicon Valley (1959–1981) ==
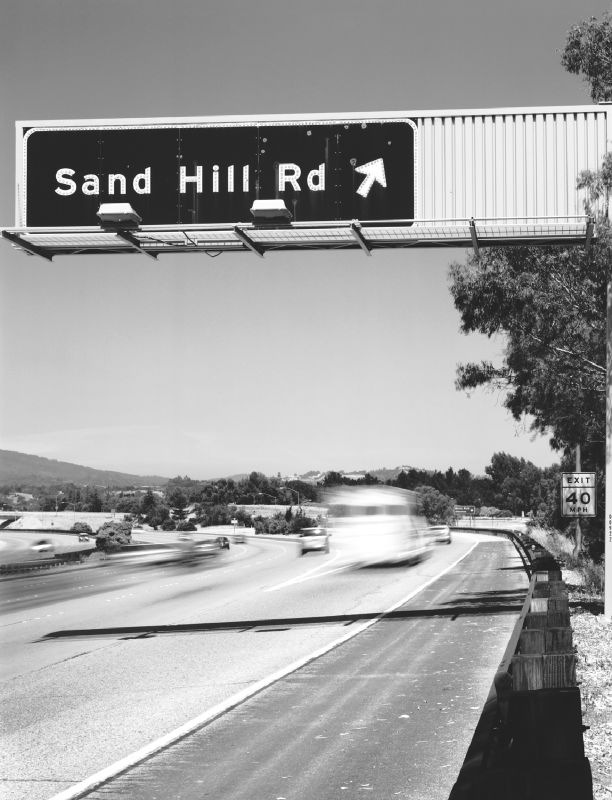
Sand Hill Road in Menlo Park, California, where many Bay Area venture capital firms are based

During the 1960s and 1970s, venture capital firms focused their investment activity primarily on starting and expanding companies. More often than not, these companies were exploiting breakthroughs in electronic, medical or data-processing technology. As a result, venture capital came to be almost synonymous with technology finance.

It is commonly noted that the first venture-backed startup was Fairchild Semiconductor (which produced the first commercially practicable integrated circuit), funded in late 1957 by a loan from Sherman Fairchild's Fairchild Camera with the help of Arthur Rock, an early venture capitalist with the firm of Hayden Stone in New York (which received 20% of the equity of the newly formed company). Another early VC firm was Venrock Associates. Venrock was founded in 1969 by Laurance S. Rockefeller, the fourth of John D. Rockefeller's six children as a way to allow other Rockefeller children to develop exposure to venture capital investments.

It was also in the 1960s that the common form of private equity fund, still in use today, emerged. Private equity firms organized limited partnerships to hold investments in which the investment professionals served as general partner and the investors, who were passive limited partners, put up the capital. The compensation structure, still in use today, also emerged with limited partners paying an annual management fee of 1–2% and a carried interest typically representing up to 20% of the profits of the partnership.

An early West Coast venture capital company was Draper and Johnson Investment Company, formed in 1962 by William Henry Draper III and Franklin P. Johnson Jr. In 1964 Bill Draper and Paul Wythes founded Sutter Hill Ventures, and Pitch Johnson formed Asset Management Company.

The growth of the venture capital industry was fueled by the emergence of the independent investment firms on Sand Hill Road, beginning with Kleiner, Perkins, Caufield & Byers and Sequoia Capital in 1972. Located in Menlo Park, California, Kleiner Perkins, Sequoia and later venture capital firms would have access to the burgeoning technology industries in the area. Kleiner Perkins was the first venture capital firm to open an office on Sand Hill Road in 1972.

By the early 1970s, there were many semiconductor companies based in the Santa Clara Valley as well as early computer firms using their devices and programming and service companies. Throughout the 1970s, a group of private equity firms, focused primarily on venture capital investments, would be founded that would become the model for later leveraged buyout and venture capital investment firms. In 1973, with the number of new venture capital firms increasing, leading venture capitalists formed the National Venture Capital Association (NVCA). The NVCA was to serve as the industry trade group for the venture capital industry. Venture capital firms suffered a temporary downturn in 1974, when the stock market crashed and investors were naturally wary of this new kind of investment fund. It was not until 1978 that venture capital experienced its first major fundraising year, as the industry raised approximately $750 million. During this period, the number of venture firms also increased. Among the firms founded in this period, in addition to Kleiner Perkins and Sequoia, that continue to invest actively are AEA Investors, TA Associates, Mayfield Fund, Apax Partners, New Enterprise Associates, Oak Investment Partners and Sevin Rosen Funds.

Venture capital played an instrumental role in developing many of the major technology companies of the 1980s. Some of the most notable venture capital investments were made in firms that include: Tandem Computers, Genentech, Apple Inc., Electronic Arts, Compaq, Federal Express and LSI Corporation.

== Early history of leveraged buyouts (1955–1981) ==
=== McLean Industries and public holding companies ===
Although not strictly private equity, and certainly not labeled so at the time, the first leveraged buyout may have been the purchase by Malcolm McLean's McLean Industries, Inc. of Pan-Atlantic Steamship Company in January 1955 and Waterman Steamship Corporation in May 1955. Under the terms of the transactions, McLean borrowed $42 million and raised an additional $7 million through an issue of preferred stock. When the deal closed, $20 million of Waterman cash and assets were used to retire $20 million of the loan debt. The newly elected board of Waterman then voted to pay an immediate dividend of $25 million to McLean Industries.

Similar to the approach employed in the McLean transaction, the use of publicly traded holding companies as investment vehicles to acquire portfolios of investments in corporate assets would become a new trend in the 1960s popularized by the likes of Warren Buffett (Berkshire Hathaway) and Victor Posner (DWG Corporation) and later adopted by Nelson Peltz (Triarc), Saul Steinberg (Reliance Insurance) and Gerry Schwartz (Onex Corporation). These investment vehicles would utilize a number of the same tactics and target the same type of companies as more traditional leveraged buyouts and in many ways could be considered a forerunner of the later private equity firms. In fact, it is Posner who is often credited with coining the term "leveraged buyout" (LBO).

Posner, who had made a fortune in real estate investments in the 1930s and 1940s acquired a major stake in DWG Corporation in 1966. Having gained control of the company, he used it as an investment vehicle that could execute takeovers of other companies. Posner and DWG are perhaps best known for the hostile takeover of Sharon Steel Corporation in 1969, one of the earliest such takeovers in the United States. Posner's investments were typically motivated by attractive valuations, balance sheets and cash flow characteristics. Because of its high debt load, Posner's DWG would generate attractive but highly volatile returns and would ultimately land the company in financial difficulty. In 1987, Sharon Steel sought Chapter 11 bankruptcy protection.

Warren Buffett, who is typically described as a stock market investor rather than a private equity investor, employed many of the same techniques in the creation on his Berkshire Hathaway conglomerate as Posner's DWG Corporation and in later years by more traditional private equity investors. In 1965, with the support of the company's board of directors, Buffett assumed control of Berkshire Hathaway. At the time of Buffett's investment, Berkshire Hathaway was a textile company, however, Buffett used Berkshire Hathaway as an investment vehicle to make acquisitions and minority investments in dozens of the insurance and reinsurance industries (GEICO) and varied companies including: American Express, The Buffalo News, the Coca-Cola Company, Fruit of the Loom, Nebraska Furniture Mart and See's Candies. Buffett's value investing approach and focus on earnings and cash flows are characteristic of later private equity investors. Buffett would distinguish himself relative to more traditional leveraged buyout practitioners through his reluctance to use leverage and hostile techniques in his investments.

=== Kohlberg Kravis Roberts and pioneers ===
Lewis Cullman's acquisition of Orkinin Exterminating Company in 1963 is among the first significant leveraged buyout transactions. However, the industry that is today described as private equity was conceived by a number of corporate financiers, most notably Jerome Kohlberg Jr. and later his protégé, Henry Kravis. Working for Bear Stearns at the time, Kohlberg and Kravis along with Kravis' cousin George Roberts began a series of what they described as "bootstrap" investments. They targeted family-owned businesses, many of which had been founded in the years following World War II and by the 1960s and 1970s were facing succession issues. Many of these companies lacked a viable or attractive exit for their founders as they were too small to be taken public and the founders were reluctant to sell out to competitors, making a sale to a financial buyer potentially attractive. In the following years, the three Bear Stearns bankers would complete a series of buyouts including Stern Metals (1965), Incom (a division of Rockwood International, 1971), Cobblers Industries (1971) and Boren Clay (1973) as well as Thompson Wire, Eagle Motors and Barrows through their investment in Stern Metals. Although they had a number of highly successful investments, the $27 million investment in Cobblers ended in bankruptcy.

By 1976, tensions had built up between Bear Stearns and Kohlberg, Kravis and Roberts leading to their departure and the formation of Kohlberg Kravis Roberts in that year. Most notably, Bear Stearns executive Cy Lewis had rejected repeated proposals to form a dedicated investment fund within Bear Stearns and Lewis took exception to the amount of time spent on outside activities. Early investors included the Hillman Family

By 1978, with the revision of the Employee Retirement Income Security Act regulations, the nascent KKR was successful in raising its first institutional fund with approximately $30 million of investor commitments. That year, the firm signed a risky precedent-setting deal to buy the publicly traded conglomerate Houdaille Industries, which made machine tools, industrial pipes, chrome-plated car bumpers and torsional viscous dampers, for $380 million. The leveraged buyout was by far the largest take-private at the time and soon ended in a spectacular failure, breakup of the half-a-century-old company and loss of thousands of jobs, even though creditors earned a profit.

In 1974, Thomas H. Lee founded a new investment firm to focus on acquiring companies through leveraged buyout transactions, one of the earliest independent private equity firms to focus on leveraged buyouts of more mature companies rather than venture capital investments in growth companies. Lee's firm, Thomas H. Lee Partners, while initially generating less fanfare than other entrants in the 1980s, would emerge as one of the largest private equity firms globally by the end of the 1990s.

The second half of the 1970s and the first years of the 1980s saw the emergence of several private equity firms that would survive the various cycles both in leveraged buyouts and venture capital. Among the firms founded during these years were: Cinven, Forstmann Little & Company, Welsh, Carson, Anderson & Stowe, Candover, and GTCR.

Management buyouts also came into existence in the late 1970s and early 1980s. One of the most notable early management buyout transactions was the acquisition of Harley-Davidson. A group of managers at Harley-Davidson, the motorcycle manufacturer, bought the company from AMF in a leveraged buyout in 1981, but racked up big losses the following year and had to ask for protection from Japanese competitors.

=== Regulatory and tax changes impact the boom ===
The advent of the boom in leveraged buyouts in the 1980s was supported by three major legal and regulatory events:

- Failure of the Carter tax plan of 1977 – In his first year in office, Jimmy Carter put forth a revision to the corporate tax system that would have, among other results, reduced the disparity in treatment of interest paid to bondholders and dividends paid to stockholders. Carter's proposals did not achieve support from the business community or Congress and were not enacted. Because of the different tax treatment, the use of leverage to reduce taxes was popular among private equity investors and would become increasingly popular with the reduction of the capital gains tax rate.
- Employee Retirement Income Security Act of 1974 (ERISA) – With the passage of ERISA in 1974, corporate pension funds were prohibited from holding certain risky investments including many investments in privately held companies. In 1975, fundraising for private equity investments cratered, according to the Venture Capital Institute, totaling only $10 million during the course of the year. In 1978, the US Labor Department relaxed certain parts of the ERISA restrictions, under the "prudent man rule", thus allowing corporate pension funds to invest in private equity resulting in a major source of capital available to invest in venture capital and other private equity. Time reported in 1978 that fund raising had increased from $39 million in 1977 to $570 million just one year later. Many of these same corporate pension investors would become active buyers of the high yield bonds (or junk bonds) that were necessary to complete leveraged buyout transactions.
- Economic Recovery Tax Act of 1981 (ERTA) – On August 15, 1981, Ronald Reagan signed the Kemp-Roth bill, officially known as the Economic Recovery Tax Act of 1981, into law, lowering of the top capital gains tax rate from 28 percent to 20 percent, and making high risk investments even more attractive.

In the years that would follow these events, private equity would experience its first major boom, acquiring some of the famed brands and major industrial powers of American business.

== The first boom (1982–1993) ==
The decade of the 1980s is perhaps more closely associated with the leveraged buyout than any decade before or since. For the first time, the public became aware of the ability of private equity to affect mainstream companies and "corporate raiders" and "hostile takeovers" entered the public consciousness. The decade would see one of the largest booms in private equity culminating in the 1989 leveraged buyout of RJR Nabisco, which would reign as the largest leveraged buyout transaction for nearly 17 years. In 1980, the private equity industry would raise approximately $2.4 billion of annual investor commitments and by the end of the decade in 1989 that figure stood at $21.9 billion marking the tremendous growth experienced.

=== Begin of the LBO boom ===
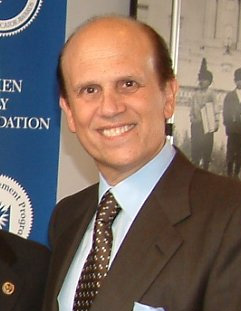
Michael Milken, the man credited with creating the market for high yield "junk" bonds and spurring the LBO boom of the 1980s

The beginning of the first boom period in private equity would be marked by the well-publicized success of the Gibson Greetings acquisition in 1982 and would roar ahead through 1983 and 1984 with the soaring stock market driving profitable exits for private equity investors.

In January 1982, former US Secretary of the Treasury William E. Simon, Ray Chambers and a group of investors, which would later come to be known as Wesray Capital Corporation, acquired Gibson Greetings, a producer of greeting cards. The purchase price for Gibson was $80 million, of which only $1 million was rumored to have been contributed by the investors. By mid-1983, just sixteen months after the original deal, Gibson completed a $290 million IPO and Simon made approximately $66 million. Simon and Wesray would later complete the $71.6 million acquisition of Atlas Van Lines. The success of the Gibson Greetings investment attracted the attention of the wider media to the nascent boom in leveraged buyouts.

Between 1979 and 1989, it was estimated that there were over 2,000 leveraged buyouts valued in excess of $250 million Notable buyouts of this period (not described elsewhere in this article) include: Malone & Hyde (1984), Wometco Enterprises (1984), Beatrice Companies (1985), Sterling Jewelers (1985), Revco Drug Stores (1986), Safeway (1986), Southland Corporation (1987), Jim Walter Corp (later Walter Industries, Inc., 1987), BlackRock (1988), Federated Department Stores (1988), Marvel Entertainment (1988), Uniroyal Goodrich Tire Company (1988) and Hospital Corporation of America (1989).

Because of the high leverage on many of the transactions of the 1980s, failed deals occurred regularly. However, the promise of attractive returns on successful investments attracted more capital. With the increased leveraged buyout activity and investor interest, the mid-1980s saw a major proliferation of private equity firms. Among the major firms founded in this period were: Bain Capital, Chemical Venture Partners, Hellman & Friedman, Hicks & Haas, (later Hicks Muse Tate & Furst), The Blackstone Group, Doughty Hanson, BC Partners, and The Carlyle Group.

As the market developed, new niches within the private equity industry began to emerge. In 1982, Venture Capital Fund of America, the first private equity firm focused on acquiring secondary market interests in existing private equity funds was founded and then, two years later in 1984, First Reserve Corporation, the first private equity firm focused on the energy sector, was founded.

=== Venture capital in the 1980s ===
The public successes of the venture capital industry in the 1970s and early 1980s (e.g., DEC, Apple, Genentech) gave rise to a major proliferation of venture capital investment firms. From just a few dozen firms at the start of the decade, there were over 650 firms by the end of the 1980s, each searching for the next major "home run". The capital managed by these firms increased from $3 billion to $31 billion over the course of the decade.

The growth the industry was hampered by sharply declining returns and certain venture firms began posting losses for the first time. In addition to the increased competition among firms, several other factors impacted returns. The market for initial public offerings cooled in the mid-1980s before collapsing after the stock market crash in 1987 and foreign corporations, particularly from Japan and Korea, flooded early stage companies with capital.

In response to the changing conditions, corporations that had sponsored in-house venture investment arms, including General Electric and Paine Webber, either sold off or closed these venture capital units. Venture capital units within Chemical Bank (today CCMP Capital) and Continental Illinois National Bank (today CIVC Partners), among others, began shifting their focus from funding early stage companies toward investments in more mature companies. Even industry founders J.H. Whitney & Company and Warburg Pincus began to transition toward leveraged buyouts and growth capital investments. Many of these venture capital firms attempted to stay close to their areas of expertise in the technology industry by acquiring companies in the industry that had reached certain levels of maturity. In 1989, Prime Computer was acquired in a $1.3 billion leveraged buyout by J.H. Whitney & Company in what would prove to be a disastrous transaction. Whitney's investment in Prime proved to be nearly a total loss with the bulk of the proceeds from the company's liquidation paid to the company's creditors.

Although lower profile than their buyout counterparts, new leading venture capital firms were also formed including Draper Fisher Jurvetson (originally Draper Associates) in 1985 and Canaan Partners in 1987 among others.

=== Corporate raiders, hostile takeovers and greenmail ===
Although buyout firms generally had different aims and methods, they were often lumped in with the "corporate raiders" who came on the scene in the 1980s. The raiders were best known for hostile bids—takeover attempts that were opposed by management. By contrast, private equity firms generally attempted to strike deals with boards and CEOs, though in many cases in the 1980s they allied with managements that were already under pressure from raiders. But both groups bought companies through leveraged buyouts; both relied heavily on junk bond financing; and under both types of owners in many cases major assets were sold, costs were slashed and employees were laid off. Hence, in the public mind, they were lumped together.

Management of many large publicly traded corporations reacted negatively to the threat of potential hostile takeover or corporate raid and pursued drastic defensive measures including poison pills, golden parachutes and increasing debt levels on the company's balance sheet. The threat of the corporate raid would lead to the practice of "greenmail", where a corporate raider or other party would acquire a significant stake in the stock of a company and receive an incentive payment (effectively a bribe) from the company in order to avoid pursuing a hostile takeover of the company. Greenmail represented a transfer payment from a company's existing shareholders to a third party investor and provided no value to existing shareholders but did benefit existing managers. The practice of "greenmail" is not typically considered a tactic of private equity investors and is not condoned by market participants.

Among the most notable corporate raiders of the 1980s were Carl Icahn, Victor Posner, Nelson Peltz, Robert M. Bass, T. Boone Pickens, Harold Clark Simmons, Kirk Kerkorian, Sir James Goldsmith, Saul Steinberg and Asher Edelman. Carl Icahn developed a reputation as a ruthless corporate raider after his hostile takeover of TWA in 1985. The result of that takeover was Icahn systematically selling TWA's assets to repay the debt he used to purchase the company, which was described as asset stripping. In 1985, Pickens was profiled on the cover of Time magazine as "one of the most famous and controversial businessmen in the U.S." for his pursuit of Unocal, Gulf Oil and Cities Services. In later years, many of the corporate raiders would be re-characterized as "Activist shareholders".

Many of the corporate raiders were onetime clients of Michael Milken, whose investment banking firm Drexel Burnham Lambert helped raise blind pools of capital with which corporate raiders could make a legitimate attempt to take over a company and provided high-yield debt financing of the buyouts.

Drexel Burnham raised a $100 million blind pool in 1984 for Nelson Peltz and his holding company Triangle Industries (later Triarc) to give credibility for takeovers, representing the first major blind pool raised for this purpose. Two years later, in 1986, Wickes Companies, a holding company run by Sanford Sigoloff raised a $1.2 billion blind pool.

In 1985, Milken raised $750 million for a similar blind pool for Ronald Perelman which would ultimately prove instrumental in acquiring his biggest target: The Revlon Corporation. In 1980, Ronald Perelman, the son of a wealthy Philadelphia businessman, and future "corporate raider" having made several small but successful buyouts, acquired MacAndrews & Forbes, a distributor of licorice extract and chocolate that Perelman's father had tried and failed to acquire 10 years earlier. Perelman would ultimately divest the company's core business and use MacAndrews & Forbes as a holding company investment vehicle for subsequent leveraged buyouts including Technicolor, Inc., Pantry Pride and Revlon. Using the Pantry Pride subsidiary of his holding company, MacAndrews & Forbes Holdings, Perelman's overtures were rebuffed. Repeatedly rejected by the company's board and management, Perelman continued to press forward with a hostile takeover raising his offer from an initial bid of $47.50 per share until it reached $53.00 per share. After receiving a higher offer from a white knight, private equity firm Forstmann Little & Company, Perelman's Pantry Pride finally was able to make a successful bid for Revlon, valuing the company at $2.7 billion. The buyout would prove troubling, burdened by a heavy debt load. Under Perelman's control, Revlon sold four divisions: two were sold for $1 billion, its vision care division was sold for $574 million and its National Health Laboratories division was spun out to the public market in 1988. Revlon also made acquisitions including Max Factor in 1987 and Betrix in 1989 later selling them to Procter & Gamble in 1991. Perelman exited the bulk of his holdings in Revlon through an IPO in 1996 and subsequent sales of stock. As of December 31, 2007, Perelman still retains a minority ownership interest in Revlon. The Revlon takeover, because of its well-known brand, was profiled widely by the media and brought new attention to the emerging boom in leveraged buyout activity.

In later years, Milken and Drexel would shy away from certain of the more "notorious" corporate raiders as Drexel and the private equity industry attempted to move upscale.

=== RJR Nabisco and the Barbarians at the Gate ===
Leveraged buyouts in the 1980s including Perelman's takeover of Revlon came to epitomize the "ruthless capitalism" and "greed" popularly seen to be pervading Wall Street at the time. One of the final major buyouts of the 1980s proved to be its most ambitious and marked both a high-water mark and a sign of the beginning of the end of the boom that had begun nearly a decade earlier. In 1989, Kohlberg Kravis Roberts (KKR) closed on a $31.1 billion takeover of RJR Nabisco. It was, at that time and for over 17 years, the largest leverage buyout in history. The event was chronicled in the book, Barbarians at the Gate: The Fall of RJR Nabisco, and later made into a television movie starring James Garner.

F. Ross Johnson was the president and CEO of RJR Nabisco at the time of the leveraged buyout and Henry Kravis was a general partner at KKR. The leveraged buyout was in the amount of $25 billion (plus assumed debt), and the battle for control took place between October and November 1988. KKR would eventually prevail in acquiring RJR Nabisco at $109 per share marking a dramatic increase from the original announcement that Shearson Lehman Hutton would take RJR Nabisco private at $75 per share. A fierce series of negotiations and horse-trading ensued which pitted KKR against Shearson Lehman Hutton and later Forstmann Little & Co. Many of the major banking players of the day, including Morgan Stanley, Goldman Sachs, Salomon Brothers, and Merrill Lynch were actively involved in advising and financing the parties.

After Shearson Lehman's original bid, KKR quickly introduced a tender offer to obtain RJR Nabisco for $90 per share—a price that enabled it to proceed without the approval of RJR Nabisco's management. RJR's management team, working with Shearson Lehman and Salomon Brothers, submitted a bid of $112, a figure they felt certain would enable them to outflank any response by Kravis's team. KKR's final bid of $109, while a lower dollar figure, was ultimately accepted by the board of directors of RJR Nabisco. KKR's offer was guaranteed, whereas the management offer (backed by Shearson Lehman and Salomon) lacked a "reset", meaning that the final share price might have been lower than their stated $112 per share. Many in RJR's board of directors had grown concerned at recent disclosures of Ross Johnson' unprecedented golden parachute deal. Time magazine featured Ross Johnson on the cover of their December 1988 issue along with the headline, "A Game of Greed: This man could pocket $100 million from the largest corporate takeover in history. Has the buyout craze gone too far?". KKR's offer was welcomed by the board, and, to some observers, it appeared that their elevation of the reset issue as a deal-breaker in KKR's favor was little more than an excuse to reject Ross Johnson's higher payout of $112 per share. F. Ross Johnson received $53 million from the buyout.

At $31.1 billion of transaction value, RJR Nabisco was by far the largest leveraged buyouts in history. In 2006 and 2007, a number of leveraged buyout transactions were completed that for the first time surpassed the RJR Nabisco leveraged buyout in terms of nominal purchase price. However, adjusted for inflation, none of the leveraged buyouts of the 2006–2007 period would surpass RJR Nabisco. Unfortunately for KKR, size would not equate with success as the high purchase price and debt load would burden the performance of the investment. It had to pump additional equity into the company a year after the buyout closed and years later, when it sold the last of its investment, it had chalked up a $700 million loss.

Two years earlier, in 1987, Jerome Kohlberg Jr. resigned from Kohlberg Kravis Roberts & Co. over differences in strategy. Kohlberg did not favor the larger buyouts (including Beatrice Companies (1985) and Safeway (1986) and would later likely have included the 1989 takeover of RJR Nabisco), highly leveraged transactions or hostile takeovers being pursued increasingly by KKR. The split would ultimately prove acrimonious as Kohlberg sued Kravis and Roberts for what he alleged were improper business tactics. The case was later settled out of court. Instead, Kohlberg chose to return to his roots, acquiring smaller, middle-market companies and in 1987, he would found a new private equity firm Kohlberg & Company along with his son James A. Kohlberg, at the time a KKR executive. Jerome Kohlberg would continue investing successfully for another seven years before retiring from Kohlberg & Company in 1994 and turning his firm over to his son.

As the market reached its peak in 1988 and 1989, new private equity firms were founded which would emerge as major investors in the years to follow, including: ABRY Partners, Coller Capital, Landmark Partners, Leonard Green & Partners and Providence Equity Partners.

== LBO bust (1990–1992) ==
By the end of the 1980s the excesses of the buyout market were beginning to show, with the bankruptcy of several large buyouts including Robert Campeau's 1988 buyout of Federated Department Stores, the 1986 buyout of the Revco drug stores, Walter Industries, FEB Trucking and Eaton Leonard. The RJR Nabisco deal was showing signs of strain, leading to a recapitalization in 1990 that involved the contribution of $1.7 billion of new equity from KKR. In response to the threat of unwelcome LBOs, certain companies adopted a number of techniques, such as the poison pill, to protect them against hostile takeovers by effectively self-destructing the company if it were to be taken over (these practices are increasingly discredited).

=== The collapse of Drexel Burnham Lambert ===
Drexel Burnham Lambert was the investment bank most responsible for the boom in private equity during the 1980s due to its leadership in the issuance of high-yield debt. The firm was first rocked by scandal on May 12, 1986, when Dennis Levine, a Drexel managing director and investment banker, was charged with insider trading. Levine pleaded guilty to four felonies, and implicated one of his recent partners, arbitrageur Ivan Boesky. Largely based on information Boesky promised to provide about his dealings with Milken, the Securities and Exchange Commission initiated an investigation of Drexel on November 17. Two days later, Rudy Giuliani, the United States Attorney for the Southern District of New York, launched his own investigation.

For two years, Drexel steadfastly denied any wrongdoing, claiming that the criminal and SEC cases were based almost entirely on the statements of an admitted felon looking to reduce his sentence. However, it was not enough to keep the SEC from suing Drexel in September 1988 for insider trading, stock manipulation, defrauding its clients and stock parking (buying stocks for the benefit of another). All of the transactions involved Milken and his department. Giuliani began seriously considering indicting Drexel under the powerful Racketeer Influenced and Corrupt Organizations Act (RICO), under the doctrine that companies are responsible for an employee's crimes.

The threat of a RICO indictment, which would have required the firm to put up a performance bond of as much as $1 billion in lieu of having its assets frozen, unnerved many at Drexel. Most of Drexel's capital was borrowed money, as is common with most investment banks and it is difficult to receive credit for firms under a RICO indictment. Drexel's CEO, Fred Joseph said that he had been told that if Drexel were indicted under RICO, it would only survive a month at most.

With literally minutes to go before being indicted, Drexel reached an agreement with the government in which it pleaded nolo contendere (no contest) to six felonies – three counts of stock parking and three counts of stock manipulation. It also agreed to pay a fine of $650 million – at the time, the largest fine ever levied under securities laws. Milken left the firm after his own indictment in March 1989. Effectively, Drexel was now a convicted felon.

In April 1989, Drexel settled with the SEC, agreeing to stricter safeguards on its oversight procedures. Later that month, the firm eliminated 5,000 jobs by shuttering three departments – including the retail brokerage operation.

The high-yield debt markets had begun to shut down in 1989, a slowdown that accelerated into 1990. On February 13, 1990, after being advised by United States Secretary of the Treasury Nicholas F. Brady, the U.S. Securities and Exchange Commission (SEC), the New York Stock Exchange (NYSE) and the Federal Reserve System, Drexel Burnham Lambert officially filed for Chapter 11 bankruptcy protection.

=== S&L and the shutdown of the Junk Bond Market ===
In the 1980s, the boom in private equity transactions, specifically leveraged buyouts, was driven by the availability of financing, particularly high-yield debt, also known as "junk bonds". The collapse of the high yield market in 1989 and 1990 would signal the end of the LBO boom. At that time, many market observers were pronouncing the junk bond market "finished". This collapse would be due largely to three factors:

- The collapse of Drexel Burnham Lambert, the foremost underwriter of junk bonds (discussed above).
- The dramatic increase in default rates among junk bond issuing companies. The historical default rate for high yield bonds from 1978 to 1988 was approximately 2.2% of total issuance. In 1989, defaults increased dramatically to 4.3% of the then $190 billion market and an additional 2.6% of issuance defaulted in the first half of 1990. As a result of the higher perceived risk, the differential in yield of the junk bond market over U.S. treasuries (known as the "spread") had also increased by 700 basis points (7 percentage points). This made the cost of debt in the high yield market significantly more expensive than it had been previously. The market shut down altogether for lower rated issuers.
- The mandated withdrawal of savings and loans from the high yield market. In August 1989, the U.S. Congress enacted the Financial Institutions Reform, Recovery and Enforcement Act of 1989 as a response to the savings and loan crisis of the 1980s. Under the law, savings and loans (S&Ls) could no longer invest in bonds that were rated below investment grade. S&Ls were mandated to sell their holdings by the end of 1993 creating a huge supply of low priced assets that helped freeze the new issuance market.

Despite the adverse market conditions, several of the largest private equity firms were founded in this period including: Apollo Management, Madison Dearborn and TPG Capital.

== The second boom ==
Beginning roughly in 1992, three years after the RJR Nabisco buyout, and continuing through the end of the decade the private equity industry once again experienced a tremendous boom, both in venture capital (as will be discussed below) and leveraged buyouts with the emergence of brand name firms managing multibillion-dollar sized funds. After declining from 1990 through 1992, the private equity industry began to increase in size raising approximately $20.8 billion of investor commitments in 1992 and reaching a high-water mark in 2000 of $305.7 billion, outpacing the growth of almost every other asset class.

=== Resurgence of leveraged buyouts ===
Private equity in the 1980s was a controversial topic, commonly associated with corporate raids, hostile takeovers, asset stripping, layoffs, plant closings and outsized profits to investors. As private equity reemerged in the 1990s it began to earn a new degree of legitimacy and respectability. Although in the 1980s, many of the acquisitions made were unsolicited and unwelcome, private equity firms in the 1990s focused on making buyouts attractive propositions for management and shareholders. According to The Economist, "[B]ig companies that would once have turned up their noses at an approach from a private-equity firm are now pleased to do business with them." Private equity investors became increasingly focused on the long-term development of companies they acquired, using less leverage in the acquisition. In the 1980s leverage would routinely represent 85% to 95% of the purchase price of a company as compared to average debt levels between 20% and 40% in leveraged buyouts in the 1990s and the first decade of the 21st century. KKR's 1986 acquisition of Safeway, for example, was completed with 97% leverage and 3% equity contributed by KKR, whereas KKR's acquisition of TXU in 2007 was completed with approximately 19% equity contributed ($8.5 billion of equity out of a total purchase price of $45 billion). Private equity firms are more likely to make investments in capital expenditures and provide incentives for management to build long-term value.

The Thomas H. Lee Partners acquisition of Snapple Beverages, in 1992, is often described as the deal that marked the resurrection of the leveraged buyout after several dormant years. Only eight months after buying the company, Lee took Snapple Beverages public and in 1994, only two years after the original acquisition, Lee sold the company to Quaker Oats for $1.7 billion. Lee was estimated to have made $900 million for himself and his investors from the sale. Quaker Oats would subsequently sell the company, which performed poorly under new management, three years later for only $300 million to Nelson Peltz's Triarc. As a result of the Snapple deal, Thomas H. Lee, who had begun investing in private equity in 1974, would find new prominence in the private equity industry and catapult his Boston-based Thomas H. Lee Partners to the ranks of the largest private equity firms.

It was also in this time that the capital markets would start to open up again for private equity transactions. During the 1990–1993 period, Chemical Bank established its position as a key lender to private equity firms under the auspices of pioneering investment banker, James B. Lee Jr. (known as Jimmy Lee, not related to Thomas H. Lee). By the mid-1990s, under Jimmy Lee, Chemical had established itself as the largest lender in the financing of leveraged buyouts. Lee built a syndicated leveraged finance business and related advisory businesses including the first dedicated financial sponsor coverage group, which covered private equity firms in much the same way that investment banks had traditionally covered various industry sectors.

The following year, David Bonderman and James Coulter, who had worked for Robert M. Bass during the 1980s completed a buyout of Continental Airlines in 1993, through their nascent Texas Pacific Group, (today TPG Capital). TPG was virtually alone in its conviction that there was an investment opportunity with the airline. The plan included bringing in a new management team, improving aircraft utilization and focusing on lucrative routes. By 1998, TPG had generated an annual internal rate of return of 55% on its investment. Unlike Carl Icahn's hostile takeover of TWA in 1985, Bonderman and Texas Pacific Group were widely hailed as saviors of the airline, marking the change in tone from the 1980s. The buyout of Continental Airlines would be one of the few successes for the private equity industry which has suffered several major failures, including the 2008 bankruptcies of ATA Airlines, Aloha Airlines and Eos Airlines.

Among the most notable buyouts of the mid-to-late 1990s included: Duane Reade (1992 and 1997), Sealy Corporation (1997), KinderCare Learning Centers (1997), J. Crew (1997), Domino's Pizza (1998), Regal Entertainment Group (1998), Oxford Health Plans (1998) and Petco (2000).

As the market for private equity matured, so too did its investor base. The Institutional Limited Partner Association was initially founded as an informal networking group for limited partner investors in private equity funds in the early 1990s. However the organization would evolve into an advocacy organization for private equity investors with more than 200 member organizations from 10 countries. As of the end of 2007, ILPA members had total assets under management in excess of $5 trillion with more than $850 billion of capital commitments to private equity investments.

=== The venture capital boom and the Internet Bubble (1995–2000) ===
In the 1980s, FedEx and Apple Inc. were able to grow because of private equity or venture funding, as were Cisco, Genentech, Microsoft and Avis. However, by the end of the 1980s, venture capital returns were relatively low, particularly in comparison with their emerging leveraged buyout cousins, due in part to the competition for hot startups, excess supply of IPOs and the inexperience of many venture capital fund managers. Unlike the leveraged buyout industry, after total capital raised increased to $3 billion in 1983, growth in the venture capital industry remained limited through the 1980s and the first half of the 1990s increasing to just over $4 billion more than a decade later in 1994.

After a shakeout of venture capital managers, the more successful firms retrenched, focusing increasingly on improving operations at their portfolio companies rather than continuously making new investments. Results would begin to turn very attractive, successful and would ultimately generate the venture capital boom of the 1990s. Former Wharton Professor Andrew Metrick refers to these first 15 years of the modern venture capital industry beginning in 1980 as the "pre-boom period" in anticipation of the boom that would begin in 1995 and last through the bursting of the Internet bubble in 2000.

The late 1990s were a boom time for the venture capital, as firms on Sand Hill Road in Menlo Park and Silicon Valley benefited from a huge surge of interest in the nascent Internet and other computer technologies. Initial public offerings of stock for technology and other growth companies were in abundance and venture firms were reaping large windfalls. Among the highest profile technology companies with venture capital backing were Amazon.com, America Online, eBay, Intuit, Macromedia, Netscape, Sun Microsystems and Yahoo!.

== Bursting of the Internet Bubble and crash (2000–2003) ==
The technology-heavy NASDAQ Composite index peaked at 5,048 in March 2000, reflecting the high point of the dot-com bubble.

The Nasdaq crash and technology slump that started in March 2000 shook virtually the entire venture capital industry as valuations for startup technology companies collapsed. Over the next two years, many venture firms had been forced to write-off large proportions of their investments and many funds were significantly "under water" (the values of the fund's investments were below the amount of capital invested). Venture capital investors sought to reduce size of commitments they had made to venture capital funds and in numerous instances, investors sought to unload existing commitments for cents on the dollar in the secondary market. By mid-2003, the venture capital industry had shriveled to about half its 2001 capacity. Nevertheless, PricewaterhouseCoopers' MoneyTree Survey shows that total venture capital investments held steady at 2003 levels through the second quarter of 2005.

Although the post-boom years represent just a small fraction of the peak levels of venture investment reached in 2000, they still represent an increase over the levels of investment from 1980 through 1995. As a percentage of GDP, venture investment was 0.058% percent in 1994, peaked at 1.087% (nearly 19x the 1994 level) in 2000 and ranged from 0.164% to 0.182% in 2003 and 2004. The revival of an Internet-driven environment (thanks to deals such as eBay's purchase of Skype, the News Corporation's purchase of MySpace.com, and the very successful Google.com and Salesforce.com IPOs) have helped to revive the venture capital environment. However, as a percentage of the overall private equity market, venture capital has still not reached its mid-1990s level, let alone its peak in 2000.

=== Stagnation in the LBO market ===
As the venture sector collapsed, the activity in the leveraged buyout market also declined significantly. Leveraged buyout firms had invested heavily in the telecommunications sector from 1996 to 2000 and profited from the boom which suddenly fizzled in 2001. In that year at least 27 major telecommunications companies, (i.e., with $100 million of liabilities or greater) filed for bankruptcy protection. Telecommunications, which made up a large portion of the overall high yield universe of issuers, dragged down the entire high yield market. Overall corporate default rates surged to levels unseen since the 1990 market collapse rising to 6.3% of high yield issuance in 2000 and 8.9% of issuance in 2001. Default rates on junk bonds peaked at 10.7 percent in January 2002 according to Moody's. As a result, leveraged buyout activity ground to a halt. The major collapses of former high-fliers including WorldCom, Adelphia Communications, Global Crossing and Winstar Communications were among the most notable defaults in the market. In addition to the high rate of default, many investors lamented the low recovery rates achieved through restructuring or bankruptcy.

Among the most affected by the bursting of the internet and telecom bubbles were two of the largest and most active private equity firms of the 1990s: Tom Hicks' Hicks Muse Tate & Furst and Ted Forstmann's Forstmann Little & Company. These firms were often cited as the highest profile private equity casualties, having invested heavily in technology and telecommunications companies. Hicks Muse's reputation and market position were both damaged by the loss of over $1 billion from minority investments in six telecommunications and 13 Internet companies at the peak of the 1990s stock market bubble. Similarly, Forstmann suffered major losses from investments in McLeodUSA and XO Communications. Tom Hicks resigned from Hicks Muse at the end of 2004 and Forstmann Little was unable to raise a new fund. The treasure of the State of Connecticut, sued Forstmann Little to return the state's $96 million investment to that point and to cancel the commitment it made to take its total investment to $200 million. The humbling of these private equity titans could hardly have been predicted by their investors in the 1990s and forced fund investors to conduct due diligence on fund managers more carefully and include greater controls on investments in partnership agreements.

Deals completed during this period tended to be smaller and financed less with high yield debt than in other periods. Private equity firms had to cobble together financing made up of bank loans and mezzanine debt, often with higher equity contributions than had been seen. Private equity firms benefited from the lower valuation multiples. As a result, despite the relatively limited activity, those funds that invested during the adverse market conditions delivered attractive returns to investors. In Europe LBO activity began to increase as the market continued to mature. In 2001, for the first time, European buyout activity exceeded US activity with $44 billion of deals completed in Europe as compared with just $10.7 billion of deals completed in the US. This was a function of the fact that just six LBOs in excess of $500 million were completed in 2001, against 27 in 2000.

As investors sought to reduce their exposure to the private equity asset class, an area of private equity that was increasingly active in these years was the nascent secondary market for private equity interests. Secondary transaction volume increased from historical levels of 2% or 3% of private equity commitments to 5% of the addressable market in the early years of the new decade. Many of the largest financial institutions (e.g., Deutsche Bank, Abbey National, UBS AG) sold portfolios of direct investments and "pay-to-play" funds portfolios that were typically used as a means to gain entry to lucrative leveraged finance and mergers and acquisitions assignments but had created hundreds of millions of dollars of losses. Some of the most notable financial institutions to complete publicly disclosed secondary transactions during this period include: Chase Capital Partners (2000), National Westminster Bank (2000), UBS AG (2003), Deutsche Bank (MidOcean Partners) (2003) Abbey National (2004) and Bank One (2004).

== Third boom and Golden Age (2003–2007) ==
As 2002 ended and 2003 began, the private equity sector, which had spent the previous two and a half years reeling from major losses in telecommunications and technology companies and had been severely constrained by tight credit markets. As 2003 got underway, private equity began a five-year resurgence that would ultimately result in the completion of 13 of the 15 largest leveraged buyout transactions in history, unprecedented levels of investment activity and investor commitments and a major expansion and maturation of the leading private equity firms.

The combination of decreasing interest rates, loosening lending standards and regulatory changes for publicly traded companies would set the stage for the largest boom private equity had seen. The Sarbanes–Oxley legislation, officially the Public Company Accounting Reform and Investor Protection Act, passed in 2002, in the wake of corporate scandals at Enron, WorldCom, Tyco, Adelphia, Peregrine Systems and Global Crossing among others, would create a new regime of rules and regulations for publicly traded corporations. In addition to the existing focus on short term earnings rather than long term value creation, many public company executives lamented the extra cost and bureaucracy associated with Sarbanes–Oxley compliance. For the first time, many large corporations saw private equity ownership as potentially more attractive than remaining public. Sarbanes–Oxley would have the opposite effect on the venture capital industry. The increased compliance costs would make it nearly impossible for venture capitalists to bring young companies to the public markets and dramatically reduced the opportunities for exits via IPO. Instead, venture capitalists have been forced increasingly to rely on sales to strategic buyers for an exit of their investment.

Interest rates, which began a major series of decreases in 2002 would reduce the cost of borrowing and increase the ability of private equity firms to finance large acquisitions. Lower interest rates would encourage investors to return to relatively dormant high-yield debt and leveraged loan markets, making debt more readily available to finance buyouts. Alternative investments also became increasingly important as investors focused on yields despite increases in risk. This search for higher yielding investments would fuel larger funds, allowing larger deals, never before thought possible, to become reality.

Certain buyouts were completed in 2001 and early 2002, particularly in Europe where financing was more readily available. In 2001, for example, BT Group agreed to sell its international yellow pages directories business (Yell Group) to Apax Partners and Hicks, Muse, Tate & Furst for £2.14 billion (approximately $3.5 billion at the time), making it then the largest non-corporate LBO in European history. Yell later bought US directories publisher McLeodUSA for about $600 million, and floated on London's FTSE in 2003.

=== Resurgence of the large buyout ===
Marked by the two-stage buyout of Dex Media at the end of 2002 and 2003, large multibillion-dollar U.S. buyouts could once again obtain significant high yield debt financing and larger transactions could be completed. The Carlyle Group, Welsh, Carson, Anderson & Stowe, along with other private investors, led a $7.5 billion buyout of QwestDex. The buyout was the third largest corporate buyout since 1989. QwestDex's purchase occurred in two stages: a $2.75 billion acquisition of assets known as Dex Media East in November 2002 and a $4.30 billion acquisition of assets known as Dex Media West in 2003. R. H. Donnelley Corporation acquired Dex Media in 2006. Shortly after Dex Media, other larger buyouts would be completed signaling the resurgence in private equity was underway. The acquisitions included Burger King (by Bain Capital), Jefferson Smurfit (by Madison Dearborn), Houghton Mifflin (by Bain Capital, the Blackstone Group and Thomas H. Lee Partners) and TRW Automotive by the Blackstone Group.

In 2006 USA Today reported retrospectively on the revival of private equity:

LBOs are back, only they've rebranded themselves private equity and vow a happier ending. The firms say this time it's completely different. Instead of buying companies and dismantling them, as was their rap in the '80s, private equity firms... squeeze more profit out of underperforming companies.

But whether today's private equity firms are simply a regurgitation of their counterparts in the 1980s... or a kinder, gentler version, one thing remains clear: private equity is now enjoying a "Golden Age." And with returns that triple the S&P 500, it's no wonder they are challenging the public markets for supremacy.

By 2004 and 2005, major buyouts were once again becoming common and market observers were stunned by the leverage levels and financing terms obtained by financial sponsors in their buyouts. Some of the notable buyouts of this period include: Dollarama (2004), Toys "R" Us (2004), The Hertz Corporation (2005), Metro-Goldwyn-Mayer (2005) and SunGard (2005).

=== Age of the mega-buyout, 21 st century ===
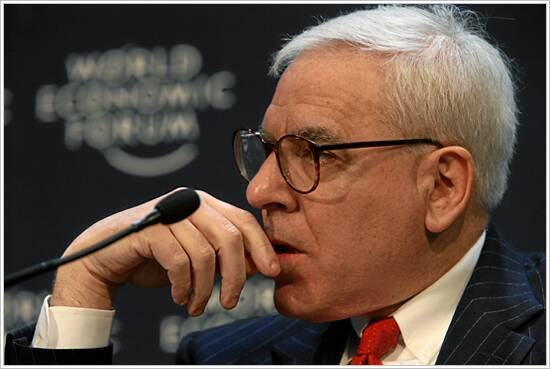
David Rubenstein, the head of the Carlyle Group, the largest private equity firm (by investor commitments) during the 2006–07 buyout boom

As 2005 ended and 2006 began, new "largest buyout" records were set and surpassed several times with nine of the top ten buyouts at the end of 2007 having been announced in an 18-month window from the beginning of 2006 through the middle of 2007. The buyout boom was not limited to the United States as industrialized countries in Europe and the Asia-Pacific region also saw new records set. In 2006, private equity firms bought 654 U.S. companies for $375 billion, representing 18 times the level of transactions closed in 2003. U.S. based private equity firms raised $215.4 billion in investor commitments to 322 funds, surpassing the previous record set in 2000 by 22% and 33% higher than the 2005 fundraising total. However, venture capital funds, which were responsible for much of the fundraising volume in 2000 (the height of the dot-com bubble), raised only $25.1 billion in 2006, a 2% percent decline from 2005 and a significant decline from its peak. The following year, despite the onset of turmoil in the credit markets in the summer, saw yet another record year of fundraising with $302 billion of investor commitments to 415 funds.

Among the largest buyouts of this period included: Georgia-Pacific Corp (2005), Albertson's (2006), EQ Office (2006), Freescale Semiconductor (2006), Ally Financial GMAC (2006), HCA (2006), Kinder Morgan (2006), Harrah's Entertainment (2006), TDC A/S (2006), Sabre Holdings (2006), Travelport (2006), Alliance Boots (2007), Biomet (2007), Chrysler (2007), First Data (2007) and TXU (2007).

=== Publicly traded ===
Although there had previously been certain instances of publicly traded private equity vehicles, the convergence of private equity and the public equity markets attracted significantly greater attention when several of the largest private equity firms pursued various options through the public markets. Taking private equity firms and private equity funds public appeared an unusual move since private equity funds often buy public companies listed on exchange and then take them private. Private equity firms are rarely subject to the quarterly reporting requirements of the public markets and tout this independence to prospective sellers as a key advantage of going private. Nevertheless, there are fundamentally two separate opportunities that private equity firms pursued in the public markets. These options involved a public listing of either:

- A private equity firm (the management company), which provides shareholders an opportunity to gain exposure to the management fees and carried interest earned by the investment professionals and managers of the private equity firm. The most notable example of this public listing was completed by The Blackstone Group in 2007
- A private equity fund or similar investment vehicle, which allows investors that would otherwise be unable to invest in a traditional private equity limited partnership to gain exposure to a portfolio of private equity investments.

In May 2006, Kohlberg Kravis Roberts (KKR) raised $5 billion in an initial public offering for a new permanent investment vehicle (KKR Private Equity Investors or KPE) listing it on the Euronext exchange in Amsterdam (ENXTAM: KPE). KKR raised more than three times what it had expected at the outset as many of the investors in KPE were hedge funds that sought exposure to private equity but that could not make long-term commitments to private equity funds. Because private equity had been booming in the preceding years, the proposition of investing in a KKR fund appeared attractive to certain investors. KPE's first-day performance was lackluster, trading down 1.7% and trading volume was limited. Initially, a handful of other private equity firms, including Blackstone, and hedge funds had planned to follow KKR's lead but when KPE was increased to $5 billion, it soaked up all the demand. That, together with the slump of KPE's shares, caused the other firms to shelve their plans. KPE's stock declined from an IPO price of €25 per share to €18.16 (a 27% decline) at the end of 2007 and a low of €11.45 (a 54.2% decline) per share in Q1 2008. KPE disclosed in May 2008 that it had completed approximately $300 million of secondary sales of selected limited partnership interests in and undrawn commitments to certain KKR-managed funds in order to generate liquidity and repay borrowings.

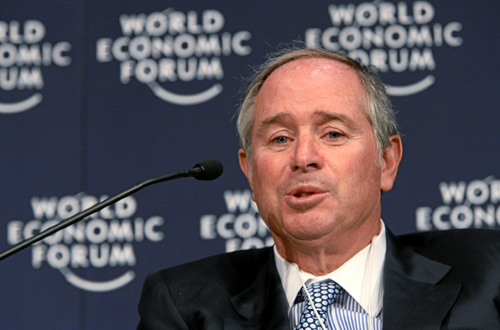
Schwarzman's Blackstone Group completed the first major IPO of a private equity firm in June 2007.

On March 22, 2007, after nine months of secret preparations, the Blackstone Group filed with the SEC to raise $4 billion in an initial public offering. On June 21, Blackstone sold a 12.3% stake in its ownership to the public for $4.13 billion in the largest U.S. IPO since 2002. Traded on the New York Stock Exchange under the ticker symbol BX, Blackstone priced at $31 per share on June 22, 2007.

Less than two weeks after the Blackstone Group IPO, rival firm Kohlberg Kravis Roberts filed with the SEC in July 2007 to raise $1.25 billion by selling an ownership interest in its management company. KKR had previously listed its KKR Private Equity Investors (KPE) private equity fund vehicle in 2006. The onset of the credit crunch and the shutdown of the IPO market would dampen the prospects of obtaining a valuation that would be attractive to KKR and the flotation was repeatedly postponed.

Other private equity investors were seeking to realize a portion of the value locked into their firms. In September 2007, the Carlyle Group sold a 7.5% interest in its management company to Mubadala Development Company, which is owned by the Abu Dhabi Investment Authority (ADIA) for $1.35 billion, which valued Carlyle at approximately $20 billion. Similarly, in January 2008, Silver Lake Partners sold a 9.9% stake in its management company to the California Public Employees' Retirement System (CalPERS) for $275 million.

Apollo Management completed a private placement of shares in its management company in July 2007. By pursuing a private placement rather than a public offering, Apollo would be able to avoid much of the public scrutiny applied to Blackstone and KKR. In April 2008, Apollo filed with the SEC to permit some holders of its privately traded stock to sell their shares on the New York Stock Exchange. In April 2004, Apollo raised $930 million for a listed business development company, Apollo Investment Corporation (NASDAQ: AINV), to invest primarily in middle-market companies in the form of mezzanine debt and senior secured loans, as well as by making direct equity investments in companies. The company also invests in the securities of public companies.

Historically, in the United States, there had been a group of publicly traded private equity firms that were registered as business development companies (BDCs) under the Investment Company Act of 1940. Typically, BDCs are structured similar to real estate investment trusts (REITs) in that the BDC structure reduces or eliminates corporate income tax. In return, REITs are required to distribute 90% of their income, which may be taxable to its investors. As of the end of 2007, among the largest BDCs (by market value, excluding Apollo Investment Corp, discussed earlier) are: American Capital Strategies (NASDAQ: ACAS), Allied Capital Corp (NASDAQ:ALD), Ares Capital Corporation (NASDAQ:ARCC), Gladstone Investment Corp (NASDAQ:GAIN) and Kohlberg Capital Corp (NASDAQ:KCAP).

=== Secondary market and evolution of asset class ===
In the wake of the collapse of the equity markets in 2000, many investors in private equity sought an early exit from their outstanding commitments. The surge in activity in the secondary market, which had previously been a relatively small niche of the private equity industry, prompted new entrants to the market, however the market was still characterized by limited liquidity and distressed prices with private equity funds trading at significant discounts to fair value.

Beginning in 2004 and extending through 2007, the secondary market transformed into a more efficient market in which assets for the first time traded at or above their estimated fair values and liquidity increased dramatically. During these years, the secondary market transitioned from a niche sub-category in which the majority of sellers were distressed to an active market with ample supply of assets and numerous market participants. By 2006 active portfolio management had become far more common in the increasingly developed secondary market and an increasing number of investors had begun to pursue secondary sales to rebalance their private equity portfolios. The continued evolution of the private equity secondary market reflected the maturation and evolution of the larger private equity industry. Among the most notable publicly disclosed secondary transactions (it is estimated that over two-thirds of secondary market activity is never disclosed publicly): CalPERS (2008), Ohio Bureau of Workers' Compensation (2007), MetLife (2007), Bank of America (2006 and 2007), Mellon Financial Corporation (2006), American Capital Strategies (2006), JPMorgan Chase, Temasek Holdings, Dresdner Bank and Dayton Power & Light.

== The Credit Crunch and post-modern private equity (2007–2008) ==
In July 2007, turmoil that had been affecting the mortgage markets, spilled over into the leveraged finance and high-yield debt markets. The markets had been highly robust during the first six months of 2007, with highly issuer friendly developments including PIK and PIK Toggle (interest is "Payable In Kind") and covenant light debt widely available to finance large leveraged buyouts. July and August saw a notable slowdown in issuance levels in the high yield and leveraged loan markets with only few issuers accessing the market. Uncertain market conditions led to a significant widening of yield spreads, which coupled with the typical summer slowdown led to many companies and investment banks to put their plans to issue debt on hold until the autumn. However, the expected rebound in the market after Labor Day 2007 did not materialize and the lack of market confidence prevented deals from pricing. By the end of September, the full extent of the credit situation became obvious as major lenders including Citigroup and UBS AG announced major writedowns due to credit losses. The leveraged finance markets came to a near standstill. As a result of the sudden change in the market, buyers would begin to withdraw from or renegotiate the deals completed at the top of the market, most notably in transactions involving: Harman International (announced and withdrawn 2007), Sallie Mae (announced 2007 but withdrawn 2008), Clear Channel Communications (2007) and BCE (2007).

The credit crunch has prompted buyout firms to pursue a new group of transactions in order to deploy their massive investment funds. These transactions have included Private Investment in Public Equity (or PIPE) transactions as well as purchases of debt in existing leveraged buyout transactions. Some of the most notable of these transactions completed in the depths of the credit crunch include Apollo Management's acquisition of the Citigroup Loan Portfolio (2008) and TPG Capital's PIPE investment in Washington Mutual (2008). According to investors and fund managers, the consensus among industry members in late 2009 was that private equity firms will need to become more like asset managers, offering buyouts as just part of their portfolio, or else focus tightly on specific sectors in order to prosper. The industry must also become better in adding value by turning businesses around rather than pure financial engineering.

== Responses ==
=== 1980s reflections ===
Although private equity rarely received a thorough treatment in popular culture, several films did feature stereotypical "corporate raiders" prominently. Among the most notable examples of private equity featured in motion pictures included:

- Wall Street (1987) – The notorious "corporate raider" and "greenmailer" Gordon Gekko, representing a synthesis of the worst features of various famous private equity figures, intends to manipulate an ambitious young stockbroker to take over a failing but decent airline. Although Gekko makes a pretense of caring about the airline, his intentions prove to be to destroy the airline, strip its assets and lay off its employees before raiding the corporate pension fund. Gekko would become a symbol in popular culture for unrestrained greed (with the signature line, "Greed, for lack of a better word, is good") that would be attached to the private equity industry.
- Other People's Money (1991) – A self-absorbed corporate raider "Larry the Liquidator" (Danny DeVito), sets his sights on New England Wire and Cable, a small-town business run by family patriarch Gregory Peck who is principally interested in protecting his employees and the town.
- Pretty Woman (1990) – Although Richard Gere's profession is incidental to the plot, the selection of the corporate raider who intends to destroy the hard work of a family-run business by acquiring the company in a hostile takeover and then selling off the company's parts for a profit (compared in the movie to an illegal chop shop). Ultimately, the corporate raider is won over and chooses not to pursue his original plans for the company.

Two other works were pivotal in framing the image of buyout firms. Barbarians at the Gate, the 1990 best seller about the fight over RJR Nabisco linked private equity to hostile takeovers and assaults on management. A blistering story on the front page of the Wall Street Journal the same year about KKR's buyout of the Safeway supermarket chain painted a much more damaging picture. The piece, which later won a Pulitzer Prize, began with the suicide of a Safeway worker in Texas who had been laid off and went on to chronicle how KKR had sold off hundreds of stores after the buyout and slashed jobs.

=== Contemporary reflections and controversies ===
Carlyle group featured prominently in Michael Moore's 2003 film Fahrenheit 9/11. The film suggested that The Carlyle Group exerted tremendous influence on U.S. government policy and contracts through their relationship with the president's father, George H. W. Bush, a former senior adviser to the Carlyle Group. Moore cited relationships with the Bin Laden family. The movie quotes author Dan Briody claiming that the Carlyle Group "gained" from September 11 because it owned United Defense, a military contractor, although the firm's $11 billion XM2001 Crusader artillery rocket system developed for the U.S. Army is one of the few weapons systems canceled by the Bush administration.

Over the next few years, attention intensified on private equity as the size of transactions and profile of the companies increased. The attention would increase significantly following a series of events involving The Blackstone Group: the firm's initial public offering and the birthday celebration of its CEO. The Wall Street Journal observing Blackstone Group's Steve Schwarzman's 60th birthday celebration in February 2007 described the event as follows:

The Armory's entrance hung with banners painted to replicate Mr. Schwarzman's sprawling Park Avenue apartment. A brass band and children clad in military uniforms ushered in guests. A huge portrait of Mr. Schwarzman, which usually hangs in his living room, was shipped in for the occasion. The affair was emceed by comedian Martin Short. Rod Stewart performed. Composer Marvin Hamlisch did a number from A Chorus Line. Singer Patti LaBelle led the Abyssinian Baptist Church choir in a tune about Mr. Schwarzman. Attendees included Colin Powell and New York Mayor Michael Bloomberg. The menu included lobster, baked Alaska and a 2004 Maison Louis Jadot Chassagne Montrachet, among other fine wines.

Schwarzman received a severe backlash from both critics of the private equity industry and fellow investors in private equity. The lavish event which reminded many of the excesses of notorious executives including Bernie Ebbers (WorldCom) and Dennis Kozlowski (Tyco International). David Bonderman, the founder of TPG Capital remarked, "We have all wanted to be private – at least until now. When Steve Schwarzman's biography with all the dollar signs is posted on the web site none of us will like the furor that results – and that's even if you like Rod Stewart." As the IPO drew closer, there were moves by a number of congressman and senators to block the stock offering and to raise taxes on private equity firms and/or their partners—proposals many attributed in part to the extravagance of the party.

David Rubenstein's fears would be confirmed when in 2007, the Service Employees International Union (SEIU) launched a campaign against private equity firms, specifically the largest buyout firms through public events, protests as well as leafleting and web campaigns. A number of leading private equity executives were targeted by the union members. However the SEIU's campaign was non nearly as effective at slowing the buyout boom as the credit crunch of 2007 and 2008 would ultimately prove to be.

In 2008, the SEIU would shift part of its focus from attacking private equity firms directly toward the highlighting the role of sovereign wealth funds in private equity. The SEIU pushed legislation in California that would disallow investments by state agencies (particularly CalPERS and CalSTRS) in firms with ties to certain sovereign wealth funds. The SEIU has attempted to criticize the treatment of taxation of carried interest. The SEIU, and other critics, point out that many wealthy private equity investors pay taxes at lower rates (because the majority of their income is derived from carried interest, payments received from the profits on a private equity fund's investments) than many of the rank and file employees of a private equity firm's portfolio companies.

== See also ==
- Business Development Company
- Financial sponsor
- Investment banking
- Mergers and acquisitions
- Mezzanine capital
- Private equity firm
- Private equity fund
- Private equity secondary market
- Private investment in public equity
- Taxation of Private Equity and Hedge Funds
