= Alex Navab =

American financier (1965–2019)

- Born: November 24, 1965; Isfahan, Iran
- Died: July 7, 2019 (aged 53); Greece
- Education: Columbia University (BA); Harvard Business School (MBA)
- Occupation: private equity executive
- Employer: Kohlberg Kravis Roberts

Alex Navab (November 24, 1965 – July 7, 2019) was an American financier who was the head of the Americas Private Equity Business of Kohlberg Kravis Roberts and possible successor to the firm.

== Early life ==
Navab was born on November 24, 1965, in Isfahan, to an Iranian father and Greek mother, Dr. Ali and Katina (Armenakis) Navab. His father was a physician. The family fled for Greece after the Iranian revolution in 1979 and then moved to the United States. He graduated from Columbia College as Phi Beta Kappa in 1987 and Harvard Business School in 1991.

== Career ==
He worked at Goldman Sachs and James D. Wolfensohn, Inc. before joining KKR in 1993. During his time at KKR, he oversaw its takeover of the Nielsen Company, Yellow Pages and Borden. Navab became co-president of KKR's American private equity business in 2008. He became the sole president in 2014. He helped the firm raise $13.9 billion, one of the biggest of its kind. He was the youngest partner at KKR.

Navab sat on the management committee of KKR and was considered by many in the industry to be a candidate to succeed Henry Kravis and George R. Roberts. However, he was reported to have health issues which raised concerns about his prospects of succession. After two other executives, Scott C. Nuttall and Joseph Bae, were promoted to co-presidents, he departed KKR in 2017 and launched his own buyout firm, Navab Capital Partners.

== Philanthropy ==
His philanthropic activities included serving as a trustee of Columbia University as well as on the boards of the Robin Hood Foundation and NewYork–Presbyterian Hospital. He was also involved in the Greek American community and was named "Executive of the Year" in 2017 by the Hellenic American Association for Professionals in Finance.

In 2016, he received an Ellis Island Medal of Honor for his professional achievements and public service. He received a John Jay Award from Columbia College in 2011, along with Ghanaian economist and future Minister for Finance and Economic Planning Ken Ofori-Atta, Israeli ambassador Michael Oren, and Livingston Award-winning journalist Elizabeth Rubin.

== Political activities ==
Navab served on the advisory council of the Hamilton Project, an economic policy initiative at the Brookings Institution, where business leaders put forward proposals for America's economic policy. He was the former co-chair of the national council of the American Enterprise Institute and supported former governor Jeb Bush for the Republican nomination for president in 2016.

== Personal life ==
He died on July 7, 2019, while vacationing with his family in Greece. His memorial service was held in Central Park and was attended by 1,800 people, including Mitt Romney, Henry Kissinger, Ali Wentworth, George Stephanopoulos, Wilbur Ross, Mariska Hargitay, Peter Hermann, and Aerin Lauder.
