= The Piano Teacher =

The Piano Teacher may refer to

- The Piano Teacher (Jelinek novel), a 1983 novel by Elfriede Jelinek
  - The Piano Teacher (film) a 2001 film, based on the Jelinek novel
- The Piano Teacher (Lee novel), a 2009 novel by Janice Y. K. Lee
- The Piano Teacher, a nonfiction book by Robert K. Tanenbaum, published in 1987
- Piano teacher, a private or classroom instructor of piano performance
