= Carveout =

Carveout or carve-out may refer to:

- Divisional buyout
- Equity carve-out
- A specific exemption incorporated into a law.
