= Janice Y. K. Lee =

Hong Kong-American novelist

- Born: 1972 (age 53–54); British Hong Kong
- Education: Harvard University; Hunter College
- Occupation: Novelist
- Spouse: Joseph Bae (m. 1996)
- Writing career
- Genre: Fiction

Korean name
- Hangul: 이윤경
- Hanja: 李倫京
- RR: I Yungyeong
- MR: I Yun'gyŏng
- Website: janiceyklee.com

Janice Y. K. Lee (born 1972), is a Hong Kong-born American author, known for her best-selling debut novel The Piano Teacher.

== Career ==
After graduating from Harvard College with a degree in English and American Literature and Language, Lee moved to New York City, where she worked as an editor at Elle and Mirabella magazines. After several years, she enrolled in Hunter College's MFA program and began writing her first novel. Lee initially wrote The Piano Teacher as a short story and decided to expand the story into a novel length work. Once published, The Piano Teacher, published in November 2009, was on the New York Times bestseller list for 19 weeks and was translated into 26 languages worldwide. The novel tells a sweeping tale of love and betrayal, set in Hong Kong during and after World War II.

In July 2015 Lee announced that her follow-up novel would be titled The Expatriates and follow three American expats living in Hong Kong. The novel was published in January 2016. In February 2017 it was announced that Nicole Kidman and her production company Blossom Films had optioned the book to be adapted as a miniseries. Alice Bell is attached to write the adaptation and Lulu Wang will direct while Kidman stars.

Both of Lee's novels have been published to critical acclaim. The New York Times Book Review called Lee "[a] female, funny Henry James in Asia," and the San Francisco Chronicle praised her "talent for infusing much-needed moments of reflection into what could otherwise devolve into maudlin melodrama".

== Personal life ==
Lee is of Korean descent. She was born and raised in Hong Kong before moving to the United States for school. She married fellow Korean-American Joseph Bae in 1996. They live in New York City with their four children.

== Selected works ==
- The Piano Teacher (2009)
- The Expatriates (2016)
