= Joseph Bae =

Co-CEO of KKR

- Born: 1973 (age 52–53); South Korea
- Education: Harvard University (AB)
- Title: Co-CEO, Kohlberg Kravis Roberts
- Spouse: Janice Y. K. Lee (m. 1996)

Joseph Yong Bum Bae (born 1973) is an American billionaire businessman who is the co-chief executive officer of KKR & Co. Inc, along with Scott Nuttall. They took over as co-chief executives in fall 2021 from KKR's founders, Henry Kravis and George Roberts.

== Early life and education ==
Bae was born in 1973 in South Korea, before his family moved to the United States in the 1970s. Bae attended Phillips Academy before attending Harvard College, where he graduated with a bachelor's degree in economics in 1994.

== Career ==
Bae joined KKR in 1996 after a short stint at Goldman Sachs. He is credited with a critical role in KKR's expansion in Asia. He is the first Korean-American to hold a top corporate position in his industry. In 2021, he was one of the founders of The Asian American Foundation.

As of 2025, Forbes estimated his net worth at US$2.4 billion.

== Personal life ==
In 1996, Bae married Janice Y. K. Lee, a fellow Harvard graduate. The couple are major donors to Harvard University, and Bae serves on the Harvard Corporation. Bae, along with his wife Janice, was among a group of Harvard alumni who donated $45 million for Harvard's Asian American studies program in 2021. The couple have four children, and live in New York.
