= Kohlberg & Company =

American private equity firm

Kohlberg
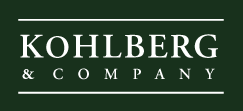
- Company type: Private
- Industry: Private equity
- Founded: 1987; 39 years ago
- Headquarters: Mount Kisco, New York, U.S.
- Key people: James A. Kohlberg (Chairman)
- Products: Investments, private equity funds
- Website: kohlberg.com

Kohlberg, formerly known as Kohlberg & Company, L.L.C, is an American private equity firm that focuses on leveraged buyout transactions. Founded by investor Jerome Kohlberg, Jr., the firm invests in a variety of transactions including leveraged carveout, take-private transactions, and acquisitions of privately held companies.

Kohlberg & Company is headquartered in Mount Kisco, New York.

== History ==
The firm was founded in 1987, when American businessman and investor Jerome Kohlberg Jr. resigned from Kohlberg Kravis Roberts & Co. over differences in strategy. Kohlberg did not favor the larger buyouts, including Beatrice Companies in 1985 and Safeway in 1986, highly leveraged transactions or hostile takeovers being pursued increasingly by KKR. Instead, Kohlberg chose to return to his roots, acquiring smaller, middle-market companies, and in 1987 he formed Kohlberg & Company along with his son James, who at that time was a KKR executive. Their intent was to concentrate on transactions that could generate returns through revenue growth and operating improvements using only moderate leverage. Jerome Kohlberg retired from Kohlberg & Company in 1994.

== Acquisitions ==
In 2019, Kohlberg acquired majority stake in EN Engineering. In 2021, Kohlberg & Company led a recapitalization transaction with Trinity Life Sciences. In 2023, Kohlberg acquired majority stake in Engage PEO, an human resource outsourcing company. In 2024, the firm acquired majority stake in CLEAResult, an energy service provider. In 2025, the firm acquired RESA Power from Investcorp.

== See also ==
- History of private equity and venture capital
- MarketCast
