= MarketCast =

American company

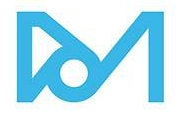
- Type: Portfolio company
- Industry: Fandom
- Founded: 1987, Los Angeles
- Headquarters: Los Angeles
- Area served: Worldwide
- Key people: Lana Busignani (CEO)
- Owner: Kohlberg & Company
- Number of employees: 700
- Website: https://marketcast.com/

MarketCast is an American company specializing in fandom, market research and data analytics. Based in Los Angeles, it was founded in 1987 and is a portfolio company of Kohlberg & Company. It offers research and data science to companies ranging from Hollywood studios through streaming media services, video game publishers and lifestyle businesses to sports leagues. It has offices in Los Angeles, New York City, Boston, London, Pune and Reading.

MarketCast has been described as the "leading provider of iterative testing and benchmarking services that underpin the development of worldwide marketing campaigns."

== History ==
MarketCast was founded by Joseph Helfgot when he presented positioning studies to Orion Pictures to help its marketing team with Dances with Wolves and The Silence Of The Lambs. It had been acquired by Reed Business Information in 2000 and was then sold to Shamrock Holdings in 2012. In 2016, it was bought from RLJ Equity Partners and State Street Global Advisors. In August 2015 MarketCast acquired the Insight Strategy Group. In August 2017, MarketCast acquired Fizziology, a data analytics company based in Indianapolis, and in 2018 it bought Turnkey Intelligence, a sports research firm. As a result of these four acquisitions MarketCast began to operates through four consumer insights branches. In September 2020 it acquired data science company Deductive. In March 2022, MarketCast acquired the New York-headquartered company, Phoenix Marketing International - a research and analytics provider specialising in advertising measurement.
