= The Piano Teacher (Lee novel) =

2009 novel by Janice Y. K. Lee

The Piano Teacher is a 2009 novel by Janice Y. K. Lee about a love story set in Hong Kong in the 1940s and 50s. It is about a married woman who's hired by a rich family and ends up having an affair with the family driver, only to discover his tragic past with a former lover. The book became a global bestseller.

The character of Trudy was loosely based on Emily Hahn.

== Plot ==
The novel is set in Hong Kong in the 1940s and 50s, when it was still a British territory. Upon his arrival in Hong Kong, Will Truesdale meets Trudy Liang, a beautiful Eurasian socialite of Portuguese and Chinese descent. She and Will fall deeply in love, but are inevitably separated by World War II and the Japanese invasion of Hong Kong. Will is sent to an internment camp while Trudy becomes both the tutor and unwilling mistress of the cruel Japanese General Otsubo, who rules Hong Kong.

Ten years later Claire Pendelton, twenty-eight and newly married, moves from England to Hong Kong with her husband Martin. She is hired by the Chens, a wealthy Chinese family, to give piano lessons to their ten-year-old daughter Locket. Claire begins an affair with Will, a 43-year-old Englishman who is working as the Chens' driver, unaware of his tragic past or his former lover. The novel moves fluidly between the two love affairs that happen 10 years apart, tying together the social fabric that interweaves the lives of so many, and ultimately culminates in the revelations of war-time secrets and betrayals.

== Characters ==
- Claire Pendleton - a married Englishwoman who becomes the piano teacher for Locket Chen and who begins an affair with Will Truesdale
- Will Truesdale - An Englishman working as a chauffeur to the Chens who has a tragic past with Trudy Liang, who betrayed him in order to save his life in a POW Camp ten years ago; he also has an affair with Claire Pendleton
- Trudy Liang - Will's lover, A Eurasian socialite, born to a Chinese father and Portuguese mother (who went missing when Trudy was eight years old); Trudy first met Will ten years ago and began an affair with him, but later became a kept mistress of Otsobu, a Japanese general, in order to save Will's life; she is Locket's biological mother
- Victor and Melody Chen - a wealthy Chinese couple who hire Claire Pendleton as their daughter's piano teacher. Melody was Trudy Liang's cousin and raises Trudy's daughter as her own; Victor dislikes Claire
- Locket Chen - the ten-year-old adopted daughter of Victor and Melody Chen whose biological parents are Trudy Liang and Otsobu; Melody raises her as her own, so that she is unaware of her background. She is also a student of Claire Pendleton
- Otsobu - a Japanese general who was impressed by Trudy's teaching of English and forces her to be his lover; he also is Locket's biological father
- Dominick Wong - Trudy and Melody's cousin
- Martin Pendleton - Claire's middle-aged husband, who is unaware of her affair
- Angeline Biddle - a small Chinese woman married to British businessman Frederick Biddle, whose family were against the marriage. Her son is in school in England. She lives on the Peak, where Chinese are not welcome. Went to primary school with Trudy.
- Ned Young - Canadian soldier. POW who escaped and was taken in by Will
- Mary Winkle - Companion of Edwina Storch. Together they represent the height of British society in Hong Kong
- Hugh Trotter - Brit, head of British Camp
- Reggie Arbogast - Brit - who is one of the three men who knows where the Crown Collection of Hong Kong (including priceless Chinese antiquities and artifacts) is hidden to protect them during World War II. Married to Regina
