= Divisional buyout =

Concept in finance

A divisional buyout or carveout, in finance, is a transaction in which a corporate division, business unit, or subsidiary is acquired using the same financial structuring as a leveraged buyout.

Typically, in these transactions, the financial sponsor will turn the acquired business into a standalone company, necessitating the creation of certain functions that were formerly provided by the parent company.

== Divisional reverse leveraged buyout (D-RLBO) ==
A D-RLBO is a leveraged buyout of a division or subsidiary that subsequently comes to trade on the public markets. From the point of view of a divesting firm, the D-RLBO permits the sale of a subsidiary to its management and/or private investors who subsequently restructure its assets and capital structure to enhance overall firm value.

Avon Products Inc. provides an example. Avon divested specialty jeweler Tiffany & Co. to private equity investors who subsequently accomplished an initial public offering (IPO).
