= George R. Roberts =

American businessman (born 1943)

George Rosenberg Roberts
- Born: September 14, 1943 (age 83); Houston, Texas, US
- Education: Claremont McKenna College (BA); University of California, Hastings College of the Law (JD)
- Occupations: Co-founder, Kohlberg Kravis Roberts
- Spouses: Leanne Bovet (m. 1968; died 2003); Linnea Conrad (m. 2010)
- Children: 3
- Relatives: Henry Kravis (cousin)

George Rosenberg Roberts (born September 14, 1943) is an American billionaire financier. He is one of the three original partners of Kohlberg Kravis Roberts & Co. (KKR & Co.), which he co-founded alongside Jerome Kohlberg and first cousin Henry Kravis in 1976. As of August 2025, he has an estimated net worth of $17.1 billion.

== Early life ==
George Roberts was born into a Jewish family in Houston, Texas. He graduated from Culver Military Academy in 1962 and received the institution's "Man of the Year" Award in 1998. He attended Claremont McKenna College, graduating in 1966, and the University of California's Hastings College of the Law, graduating in 1969.

== Career ==
Roberts worked for Bear Stearns in the late 1960s and early 1970s becoming a partner at the age of 29. While at Bear Stearns, Roberts, alongside Kohlberg and Kravis, began a series of what they described as "bootstrap" investments. Their acquisition of Orkin Exterminating Company in 1964 is among the first significant leveraged buyout transactions. In the following years, the three Bear Stearns bankers would complete a series of buyouts, including Stern Metals (1965), Incom (a division of Rockwood International, 1971), Cobblers Industries (1971), and Boren Clay (1973) as well as Thompson Wire, Eagle Motors, and Barrows through their investment in Stern Metals. Although they had a number of highly successful investments, the $27 million investment in Cobblers ended in bankruptcy.

By 1976, tensions had built up between Bear Stearns and the trio of Kohlberg, Kravis, and Roberts, leading to their departure and the formation of Kohlberg Kravis Roberts that year. Notably, Bear Stearns executive Cy Lewis had rejected repeated proposals to form a dedicated investment fund within Bear Stearns and Lewis took exception to the amount of time spent on outside activities. Early investors in KKR included Henry Hillman. By 1978, with the revision of the ERISA regulations, the nascent KKR was successful in raising the first institutional fund with investor commitments.

He had an estimated net worth of $5.9 billion as of 2018.

== Personal life ==
In 1968, he married Leanne Bovet, daughter of Eric B. Bovet and Dorothy Champion of San Mateo, California. Eric Bovet was the son of Swiss immigrant Louis Bovet and Grace Borel; Grace Borel was the daughter of Swiss immigrant Antoine Borel, a prominent banker in San Francisco and San Mateo. Leanne Bovet died in 2003.

On May 22, 2010, he married Goldman Sachs partner Linnea Conrad.

== Philanthropic and public positions ==
Roberts is the founder and chairman of the Roberts Enterprise Development Fund (REDF), a nonprofit organization and "employment social enterprise". REDF focuses on job creation for people facing significant barriers to work. Its revenue in 2023 was over $35 million.

Roberts also serves as a trustee of Claremont McKenna College and Culver Military Academy, and is a board member of the San Francisco Symphony, the San Francisco Ballet and the Fine Arts Museum. In 2012, he donated $50 million to Claremont McKenna College. He again donated $140 million to the college in 2022.

== Awards and honors ==
- Golden Plate Award of the American Academy of Achievement, 1988
