= Salim L. Lewis =

American businessman

- NY Federation photograph c. 1952
- Born: October 5, 1908; Brookline, Massachusetts, United States
- Died: April 28, 1978 (aged 69); Manhattan, New York City
- Education: Boston University
- Alma mater: Boston University
- Occupation: Investment banking
- Years active: 1928 to 1978
- Employer: Officially managing partner of Bear Stearns from 1949-1978, effective head from 1942.
- Known for: Investment banking, bond and block stock trading, and the earliest domestic arbitrage, philanthropy as lay head of The New York Federation of Jewish Philanthropies
- Spouse: Diana Frances Bonnor
- Children: Four (three sons and a daughter)

Salim L. "Cy" Lewis (October 5, 1908 – April 28, 1978) was the Managing Partner of Bear, Stearns & Company, running the company from 1949 until shortly before his death in 1978.

== Early life ==
Salim or "Cy" was born Salim Lissner Lewis on October 5, 1908, in Brookline, Massachusetts, to Max Lewis and Hattie Lissner Lewis, Orthodox Jews. Their marriage was their first and only. Cy was their first child; a sister, Isabel Alma Lewis, was born later. She married Sam Kantor and had a number of children, one of whom survived to adulthood and is a physician practicing in San Francisco. Max, who was 46 at his son's birth, was born in western Russia or eastern Poland in 1862, and came to The United States in 1877 at 15, at which time he changed his last name to Lewis. Max declined to reveal his given name to his son, his daughter, or to his first born grandson. Max's wife, Hattie Lissner, was born in Massachusetts of German Jewish parents who immigrated in the mid 19th century. Salim L. Lewis attended Boston University for three semesters, and dropped out because he could not afford tuition. Though he was asthmatic, he played left guard in weekend professional football in Boston for a while (a time when professional football paid $50–$75 a game). In 1927, he moved to Philadelphia for a short time to sell shoes. Salim L. Lewis married once. His wife Diana came to their marriage having been married twice to Jewish men. She had had children by neither husband. Her maiden name was Diana Frances Bonnor. Her mother's maiden name was Laura Felger. Diana's father was Frederick Charles Dempster Bonnor, and he was called Fred. Fred Bonnor was an Englishman who came to the states alone when he was 15. He was the youngest of three sons. His marriage to Laura was their only marriage, and Diana was their only child; Salim and Diana had four children, three boys and a girl, in that order: Salim B. Lewis; Roger B. Lewis; John B. Lewis; and Bonnie Lewis.

== Bear Stearns ==
Salim L. Lewis joined Bear Stearns & Company, a general partnership and member of The New York Stock Exchange and other exchanges. This was his fifth and last place of employment on Wall Street. He started with Bear Stearns' partnership in 1937 with $20,000, loaned by his first and only wife, Diana Felger Bonnor Lewis, who was born in Newark, New Jersey of an American woman whose parents were German Lutheran, and an English father, Church of England—and he became a general partner of that firm. The $20,000 contribution was part of a divorce settlement with Diana Bonnor's 2nd husband. Bear Stearns was capitalized at about $500,000 at the time. Lewis effectively managed Bear Stearns throughout the war without a title. By 1949, he was named the firm's managing partner—but not its senior partner, a title retained till his death by Victor Theodore Low, originally Lowenstein (Victor Theodore Lowenstein). With "by far the largest percentage of the profits., Cy Lewis ran Bear, Stearns & Company, a general partnership, from 1949 to his death.

== Death ==
On the evening of his retirement at the Harmonie Club on April 26, 1978, Lewis suffered a mild stroke while unwrapping a gold Piaget retirement watch, a gift from his partners. He fell to the floor and retained consciousness. He suffered more strokes the following day and died two days later, April 28, at Mount Sinai Hospital.
