= Bilzerian =

Bilzerian is a surname. Notable people with the surname include:

- Adam Bilzerian (born 1983), Saint Kitts and Nevis poker player and writer
- Dan Bilzerian (born 1980), American venture capitalist and professional poker player
- Paul Bilzerian (born 1950), American financier convicted of securities fraud
