= Corporate raid =

Company acquisition strategy

In business, a corporate raid is the process of buying a large stake in a corporation and then using shareholder voting rights to require the company to undertake novel measures designed to increase the share value, generally in opposition to the desires and practices of the corporation's current management. The measures might include replacing top executives, downsizing operations, or liquidating the company.

Corporate raids were particularly common between the 1970s and the 1990s in the United States. By the end of the 1980s, management of many large publicly traded corporations had adopted legal countermeasures designed to thwart potential hostile takeovers and corporate raids, including poison pills, golden parachutes, and increases in debt levels on the company's balance sheet. In later years, some corporate raiding practices have been used by "activist shareholders", who purchase equity stakes in a corporation to influence its board of directors and put public pressure on its management.

== History ==
Corporate raids became a hallmark of investors in the 1970s and 1980s, particularly highlighted by the public suicide of Eli Black. Among the most notable corporate raiders of the 1970s and 1980s were Louis Wolfson, Carl Icahn, Victor Posner, Meshulam Riklis, Nelson Peltz, Robert M. Bass, T. Boone Pickens, Paul Bilzerian, Harold Clark Simmons, Kirk Kerkorian, James Goldsmith, Saul Steinberg and Asher Edelman. These investors used many of the same tactics as leveraged buyout firms and targeted similar companies. They are often described as frontrunners of modern private equity firms. In fact it is Posner, one of the first "corporate raiders," who is often credited with coining the term "leveraged buyout" or "LBO".

Victor Posner, who built his wealth through real estate investments in the 1930s and 1940s, acquired a major stake in DWG Corporation in 1966. Having gained control of the company, he used it as an investment vehicle that could execute takeovers of other companies. Posner and DWG are perhaps best known for the hostile takeover of Sharon Steel Corporation in 1969, one of the earliest such takeovers in the United States. Posner's investments were typically motivated by attractive valuations, balance sheets and cash flow characteristics. Because of its high debt load, Posner's DWG generated attractive but highly volatile returns and ultimately landed in financial difficulty. In 1987, Sharon Steel entered Chapter 11 bankruptcy protection.

Carl Icahn became widely known as a corporate raider after his hostile takeover of TWA in 1985. To repay the debt used to finance the acquisition, Icahn sold off a number of TWA's assets, a practice critics described as asset stripping.

In late 1986, Icahn launched a $7 billion hostile bid for USX Corporation, the parent company of U.S. Steel, seeking roughly 89 percent of the shares he did not already own. Chief executive David Roderick opposed the bid, and Icahn withdrew it.

T. Boone Pickens' hostile takeover bid of Gulf Oil in 1984 led to shock that such a large company could be raided. Gulf eventually sold out to Chevron for a then-record $13.3 billion ($41.2 billion today) "white knight" buyout.

Paul Bilzerian launched a number of takeover bids including Cluett Peabody & Company, Hammermill Paper Company, Pay n Pack Stores, Allied Stores and the Singer Corporation. All of his takeover bids were for all cash and for all shares and he refused any greenmail. Bilzerian was indicted for Schedule 13(d) disclosure violations and despite his claims of innocence he was convicted in 1989. After spending thirty years fighting the government in his attempt to overturn his conviction, he renounced his US citizenship in 2019.

British raider Beazer also launched several successful hostile takeovers in the 1980s, the largest being that of Koppers in early 1988 for $1.81 billion ($5.1 billion today).

Many of the corporate raiders of the 1980s were onetime clients of Michael Milken, whose investment banking firm, Drexel Burnham Lambert helped raise blind pools of capital which corporate raiders could use to make legitimate attempts to take over companies and provide high-yield debt financing of the buyouts.

=== Ronald Perelman and Revlon ===
Drexel Burnham raised a $100 million blind pool in 1984 for Nelson Peltz and his holding company Triangle Industries (later Triarc) to give credibility for takeovers, representing the first major blind pool raised for this purpose. Two years later, in 1986, Wickes Companies, a holding company run by Sanford Sigoloff, would raise a $1.2 billion blind pool. In later years, Milken and Drexel would shy away from certain of the more "notorious" corporate raiders as the firm and the private equity industry attempted to move upscale.

In 1985, Milken raised $750 million for a similar blind pool for Ronald Perelman, which would ultimately prove instrumental in acquiring his biggest target: The Revlon Corporation. In 1980, Ronald Perelman, the son of a wealthy Philadelphia businessman, and future "corporate raider", having made several small but successful buyouts, acquired MacAndrews & Forbes, a distributor of licorice extract and chocolate, which Perelman's father had tried and failed to acquire 10 years earlier. Perelman would ultimately divest the company's core business and use MacAndrews & Forbes as a holding company investment vehicle for subsequent leveraged buyouts including Technicolor, Inc., Pantry Pride and Revlon. Using the Pantry Pride subsidiary of his holding company, MacAndrews & Forbes Holdings, Perelman's overtures were rebuffed. Repeatedly rejected by the company's board and management, Perelman continued to press forward with a hostile takeover, raising his offer from an initial bid of $47.50 per share until it reached $53.00 per share. After Revlon received a higher offer from a white knight, private equity firm Forstmann Little & Company, Perelman's Pantry Pride finally was able to make a successful bid for Revlon, valuing the company at $2.7 billion. The buyout would prove troubling, burdened by a heavy debt load. Under Perelman's control, Revlon sold 4 divisions: two were sold for $1 billion, its vision care division was sold for $574 million, and its National Health Laboratories division was spun out to the public market in 1988. Revlon also made acquisitions including Max Factor in 1987 and Betrix in 1989, later selling them to Procter & Gamble in 1991. Perelman exited the bulk of his holdings in Revlon through an IPO in 1996 and subsequent sales of stock. As of December 31, 2007, Perelman still retains a minority ownership interest in Revlon. The Revlon takeover, because of its well-known brand, was profiled widely by the media and brought new attention to the emerging boom in leveraged buyout activity. Litigation associated with the takeover has also become standard reading for introductory business organization classes in most law schools, introducing what have come to be known as "Revlon duties" for boards of companies that are up for auction.

=== Decline ===
In the late 1980s several famous corporate raiders suffered from bad investments financed by large amounts of leverage, ultimately losing money for their investors. Additionally, with the fall of Michael Milken and the subsequent collapse of Drexel Burnham Lambert, the credit lines for these investors dried up. By the end of the decade, management of many large publicly traded corporations reacted negatively to the threat of potential hostile takeover or corporate raid and pursued drastic defensive measures including poison pills, golden parachutes and increasing debt levels on the company's balance sheet. Finally, in the 1990s the overall price of the American stock market increased, which reduced the number of situations in which a company's share price was low with respect to the assets that it controlled. By the end of the 1990s, the corporate raider moniker was used less frequently as private equity firms pursued different tactics than their predecessors. In later years, many of the corporate raiders would be re-characterized as "activist shareholders", such as Carl Icahn during his 2008 profile on CBS's 60 Minutes.
