= Tracy Posner =

American businesswomen, activist and actress

- Born: January 16, 1962 (age 64); United States
- Occupations: Businesswoman; animal rights activist; actress
- Years active: 1984–present
- Spouse: Burt Ward (m. 1990)
- Children: 1
- Parents: Victor Posner (father); Sari Posner (mother)
- Relatives: Steven Posner (paternal half-brother)

Tracy Posner Ward (born January 16, 1962) is an American businesswoman, animal rights activist and former actress, with her husband, actor Burt Ward. She is a daughter of the late American businessman, corporate raider and philanthropist Victor Posner and his second wife Sari Posner. In 1983, she was appointed as a vice president, assistant treasurer and assistant secretary to several corporations to include Wilson Brothers, NVF company, Southeastern Public Service Authority and Birdsboro Corp. In 1993, while still active in her father's many companies, Posner Ward was described as "one of the world's wealthiest women".

== Animal rights work ==
In 1994, Tracy Posner Ward and her husband, actor Burt Ward, founded Gentle Giants Rescue and Adoptions, a giant-breed dog rescue organization. The Wards operate a communal home for dogs, where they nurse 45–50 dogs at a time back to health, then put them up for adoption at their home and facility in Norco, California.

== Business career ==
In August 1984, Posner Ward represented her father, Victor Posner, who was unable to attend the renaming of a street in his name by Hermitage, Pennsylvania. Speaking to the assembled guests and reporters, Posner Ward apologized for her father's inability to attend by saying, "My father planned to come up to the last minute; I hope you realize how hard he tried to make it. He is truly honored by this decision." She declined to speak about her father's legal case in Florida.

In 1989, Victor Posner sent Tracy to take over Burt Ward's publicly traded fund-raising company.

In 1994, Posner Ward sued her half brother Steven Posner, claiming he let one of her smaller trust funds, worth $2 million, dwindle to $100,000 with undocumented loans and other transactions of little or no value. In the lawsuit initiated by Tracy Ward, she alleged in Dade Circuit Court that the trust should have passed to her at age 21 and been kept secret until 1993. Posner Ward was involved in lawsuits until April 2015 which entangled the estate of her late father, industrialist Victor Posner, who changed his will shortly before he died in 2002, and removed his children and grandchildren as heirs to his estate. A lawsuit by Troy Posner, not including Tracy, was eventually settled for $14 million.

== Acting ==
Posner appeared in three films with her husband, Burt Ward. She also appeared in a small role in the 2001 film What's the Worst That Could Happen?

== Personal life ==
Tracy is the wife of actor Burt Ward. They have a daughter.

== Filmography ==
Year	Title	Role	Notes
1990	Cyber-C.H.I.C.	Fiona	
1991	Virgin High	The Academy's Blessed 'Virgins'	
1995	Assault of the Party Nerds 2: The Heavy Petting Detective	Trixie	
2001	What's the Worst That Could Happen?	Unknown role	
