= Peter May =

Peter May may refer to:

- Peter W. May (born 1943/1944), American hedge fund manager
- Peter May (cricketer) (1929–1994), English Test cricketer
- Peter May (writer) (1951–2026), Scottish screenwriter and crime novelist
- Peter May (weightlifter) (born 1966), British weightlifter
- J. Peter May (born 1939), American mathematician
