= The Wendy's Company =

American multinational restaurant holding company

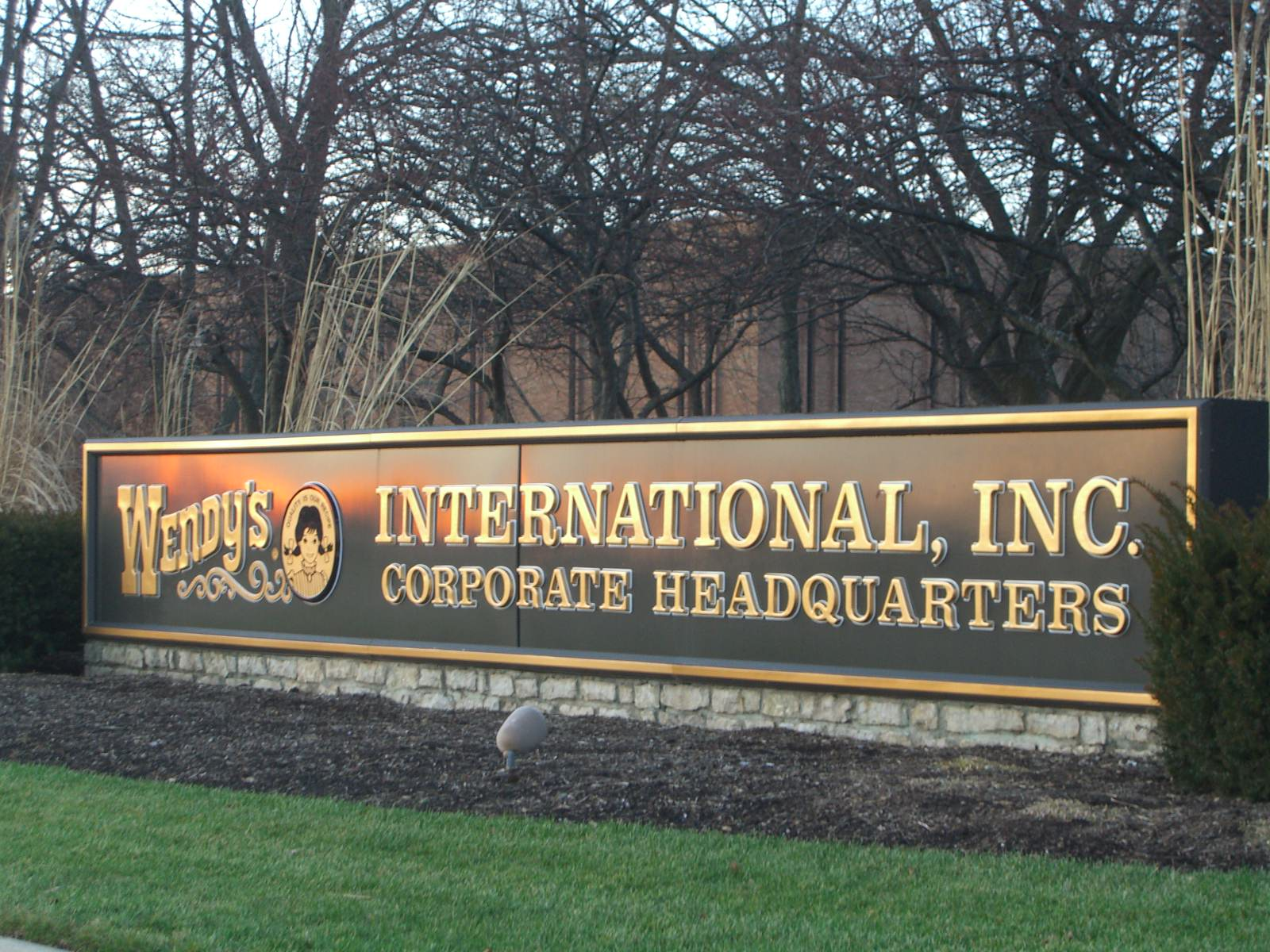
- Wendy's former headquarters sign in Dublin, Ohio
- Formerly: Deisel-Wemmer Co.; (1884–1929); Deisel-Wemmer-Gilbert Corporation; (1929–1946); DWG Cigar Corporation; (1946–1966); DWG Corporation; (1966–1993); Triarc Companies, Inc.; (1993–2008); Wendy's/Arby's Group, Inc.; (2008–2011)
- Type: Public
- Traded as: Nasdaq: WEN; S&P 600 component
- ISIN: US95058W1009
- Industry: Food service
- Founded: 1884; 142 years ago
- Headquarters: Dublin, Ohio, U.S.
- Number of locations: 5,938 (United States); 1,006 (International); 6,949 (Total)
- Area served: Worldwide
- Key people: Nelson Peltz (Chairman); Kirk Tanner (President and CEO)
- Products: Fast food
- Revenue: ▲US$2.095 billion (2022)
- Operating income: ▼US$353.3 million (2022)
- Net income: ▼US$177.4 million (2022)
- Total assets: ▲US$5.5 billion (2022)
- Total equity: ▲US$465.7 million (2022)
- Owners: Nelson Peltz (19.1%); Peter W. May (19.0%); Edward P. Garden (12.1%); Trian Partners (12.0%); BlackRock (8.3%); The Vanguard Group (7.8%)
- Number of employees: ~14,500 (As of Jan. 2, 2022)
- Subsidiaries: Wendy's; First Kitchen; Quality Is Our Recipe, LLC
- Website: www.wendys.com
- Footnotes; Financials as of January 1, 2023.

The Wendy's Company is an American fast food corporation and the holding company for Wendy's and First Kitchen. Originally founded as the Deisel-Wemmer Company, it is headquartered in Dublin, Ohio. The company's principal subsidiary, Wendy's International, is the franchisor of Wendy's restaurants.

== Wendy's International ==
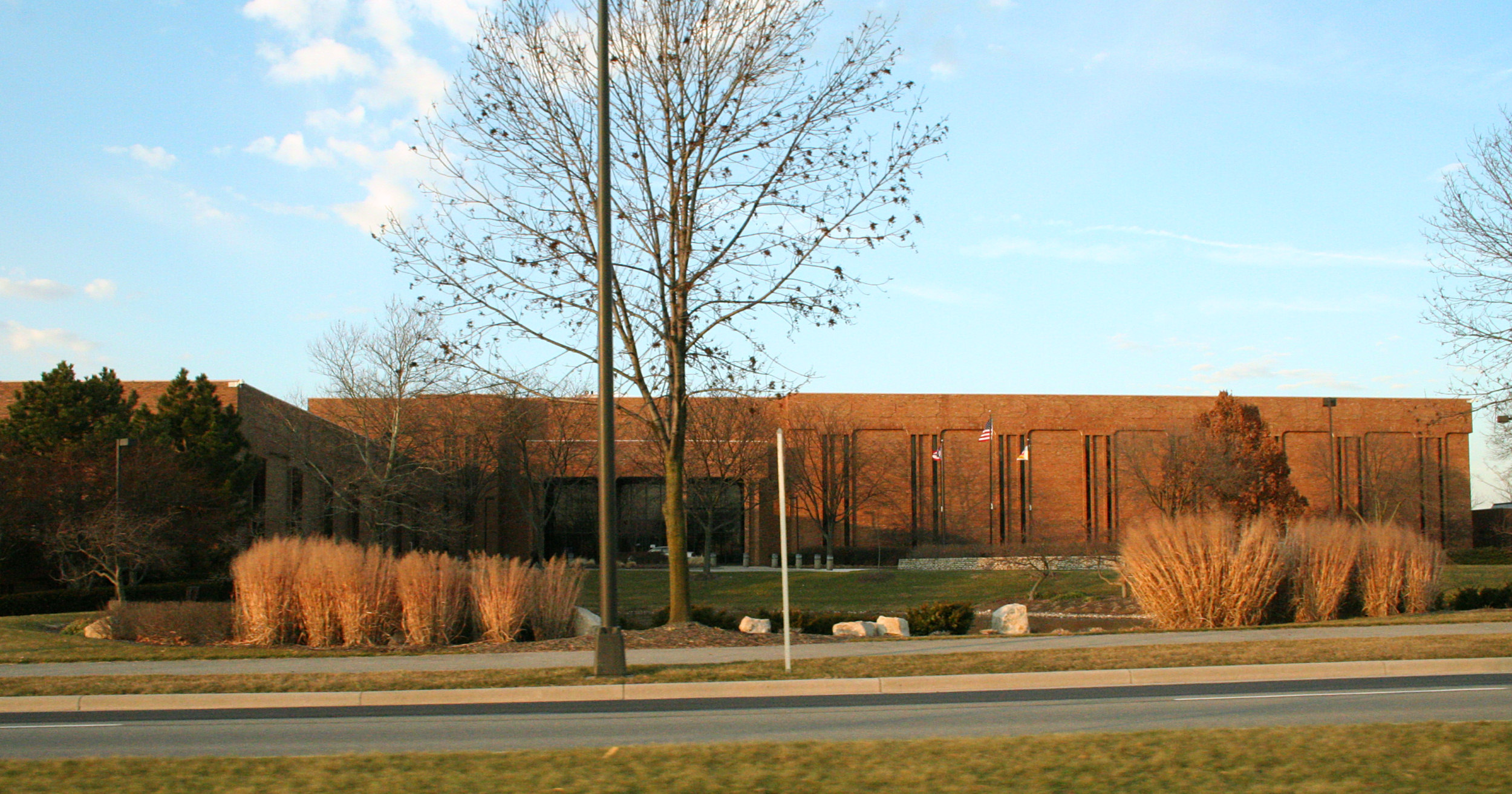
Wendy's corporate headquarters in Dublin, Ohio

Wendy's International, Inc. is the franchisor of Wendy's restaurants and the former parent company of Wendy's. It also owned Tim Hortons, Baja Fresh, and had a 70 percent stake in Cafe Express. The corporate headquarters is located in Dublin, Ohio, a suburb of Columbus. Wendy's International is owned by the Wendy's Company.

The Tim Hortons chain was spun off by Wendy's into a separate company in September 2006. The Baja Fresh chain was sold in October 2006. On September 15, 2008, the purchase of Wendy's International, Inc. by Triarc Companies, Inc. was approved by shareholders. On September 30, the merger was completed, with Triarc being renamed to Wendy's/Arby's Group, Inc, a change of leadership for both Arby's and Wendy's and the stock symbol changed to WEN.

=== Former divisions ===
- TDL Group, which operated Tim Hortons coffee stores in Canada and the United States from 1995 to 2009. TDL Group was spun off in 2006, but the ties to Wendy's as parent company were officially cut in June 2009.
- Pasta Pomodoro – Wendy's 25 percent interest in Pasta Pomodoro was sold in December 2009.

== History ==
=== DWG years ===
The present-day Wendy's Company had several predecessors, the oldest of which (Deisel-Wemmer Co., a cigar manufacturer and importer based in Ohio) was founded in 1884. On January 23, 1929, Deisel-Wemmer incorporated as Deisel-Wemmer-Gilbert Corporation (DWG), after it was acquired by an investment group.

DWG was a small firm, and to maintain market share, it purchased other small cigar companies like Odin cigars in 1930 and the Bernard Schwartz Cigar Corporation in 1939. The company changed its name to DWG Cigar Corporation on May 15, 1946. Another series of acquisitions began in 1948 with the Nathan Elson Company, followed by A. Sensenbrenner & Sons in 1955, and in 1956, Chicago Motor Club Cigar and Reading, Pennsylvania-based Yocum Brothers.

With the decline of the cigar market due to medical advisories, many smokers switched to cigarettes, which were believed to be safer at the time. DWG streamlined cigar operations and began looking for other businesses that would suit DWG's wholesale and distribution strength.

DWG sold or closed their remaining cigar operations in 1966. After a failed attempt at purchasing the Allegheny Pepsi bottling company in 1965, DWG Cigar changed its name to DWG Corporation. DWG used its cash from the cigar operation sale to purchase a 12% share in the National Propane Corporation. The New York Stock Exchange delisted DWG in 1967. Security Management Company, headed by Victor Posner, a major investor in DWG saw potential with the company as it was bold to sell its main operation. Posner saw it as a good takeover vehicle and became the controlling shareholder of DWG.

Posner was the chairman of the board and president of every company that the Security Management Company owned. This included DWG and NVF, a vulcanized fiber manufacturer that controlled the other half of Posner's companies. NVF controlled Sharon Steel Corporation, one of the country's largest specialty steel manufacturers, which led to legal trouble. Posner sat on Sharon Steel's pension trustee board and directed the pension board to invest in Posner-owned properties.

In 1971, the SEC sued, after which Posner agreed not to sit on any pension board of any of his companies. After more acquisitions from 1982 to 1985, DWG faced heavy debt. Posner approached one of his backers, Carl Lindner, Jr. for assistance, but by 1986, Lindner's American Financial Corporation had acquired warrants for more than 30% of DWG's shares. Linder did not exercise the warrants, but forced Posner to reduce his pay from DWG. Posner also started selling DWG assets, including Foxcroft, Enro and the citrus subsidiaries. DWG bought beverage company Royal Crown Cola and its fast food subsidiary Arby's through a hostile takeover in 1984.

An investor that Posner contacted to help get Sharon Steel out of bankruptcy told Posner that his lawyer, Andrew Heine, was considering buying Fischbach Corp. Just short of Fischbach being sold, Heine's Granada Investments Company made a bid for DWG at $22 per share. Posner converted all DWG options into voting shares but was unable to vote them due to an Ohio judge's order. Granada sued Posner for not taking the bid seriously and Posner countersued, stating the bid had no merit. Posner lost the case in 1991 and was forced to pay $5.5 million to Granada. The judge also noted other investigations into illegal stock trading in the Fischbach acquisition and Posner's compensation, and added three court-appointed directors to DWG's board as audit, compensation, and intercorporate transactions committees.

Posner stopped the appointed directors from presenting their report to the full board, forcing Judge Lambros to convert 50% of Security Management Company ownership in DWG to preferred shares and to sell the remaining common stock. Posner resigned as chair of DWG in 1992 and sold his shares to Trian Partners, a New York-based investment partnership led by Nelson Peltz and Peter May. Shareholders agreed to drop their longstanding lawsuits, claiming that DWG had been "raided" and "stripped".

=== Triarc ===
As part of its acquisition by Trian, DWG's name was changed to Triarc Companies, Inc in 1993. Peltz served as CEO of the company from 1993 through 2007, during which time the company sold several of its subsidiaries in order to focus on their food and beverage operations.

In August 1995, Triarc purchased Mistic Brands, Inc. from Joseph Victori Wines, Inc. for $97 million. Triarc sold off its textile companies in 1997. In 1997, Triarc acquired Snapple Beverages from Quaker Oats for $300 million, three years after Quaker Oats had purchased Snapple from leveraged buyout firm Thomas H. Lee Partners in 1994 for $1.7 billion. Cable Car Beverage Corporation, maker of Stewart's Root Beer, was purchased by Triarc in November 1997 for $31 million in stock. Triarc sold National Propane Corporation in 1999.

Snapple, Mistic, and Stewart's (formerly Cable Car Beverage) was sold by Triarc to candy company Cadbury Schweppes in 2000 for $1.45 billion In October of that same year, Cadbury Schweppes purchased Royal Crown from Triarc.

=== Wendy's/Arby's ===
On April 24, 2008, Triarc announced the acquisition of Wendy's International, the fast food company. The transaction was part of the company's strategy to transition from a holding company for numerous businesses into a true food and beverage company. The purchase was finalized on September 15, 2008, when shareholders of both Triarc and Wendy's agreed to the terms. As part of the terms, the name was changed to Wendy's/Arby's Group, Inc.

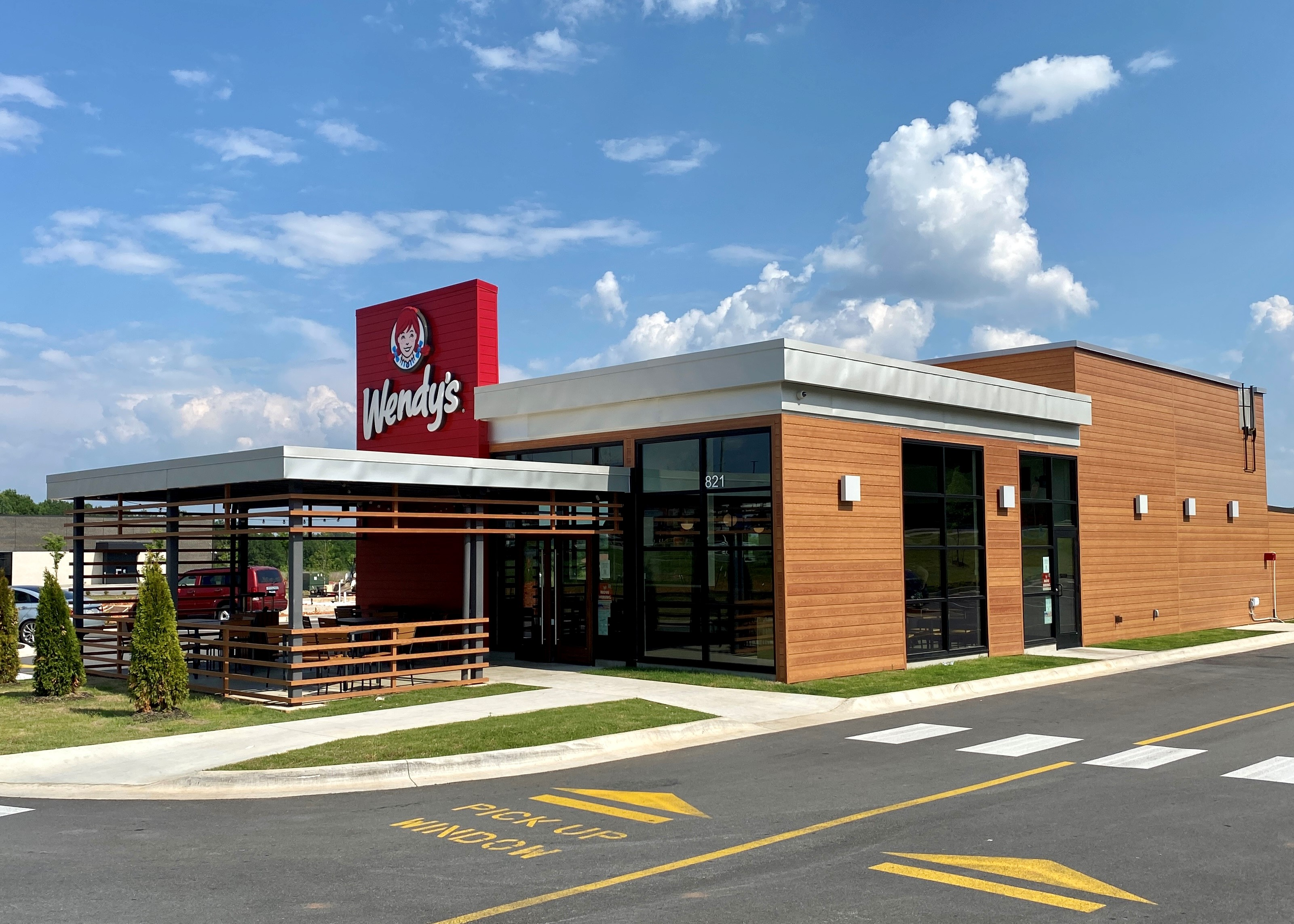
New Wendy's restaurant design in Bentonville, Arkansas

=== The Wendy's Company ===
In January 2011, the group announced it was divesting itself of the Arby's chain, which had seen lackluster sales growth since the acquisition of Wendy's in 2008. It was officially announced on January 20, 2011, that the group would seek a buyer for its Arby’s Group with 3,700 restaurants. On June 13, 2011, Wendy's/Arby's Group Inc. announced that it would sell the majority of its Arby's chain to Roark Capital Group, maintaining an 18.5% stake in the company.

In August 2011, the Wendy's Company announced it would move its corporate headquarters from Sandy Springs, Georgia, to their Dublin Restaurant Support Center (Wendy's International's headquarters) in Dublin, Ohio. This resulted in 50 jobs being moved to Ohio. On December 1, 2011, the company announced it would close the Atlanta Restaurant Support Center in Sandy Springs and consolidate all headquarters operations to the Dublin Restaurant Support Center in Ohio. This resulted in an additional 170 jobs being moved from Sandy Springs to Dublin.

On August 16, 2018, the Wendy's Company announced that it sold a 12.3% stake in Arby's parent Inspire Brands, which was formed after Arby's Restaurant Group bought Buffalo Wild Wings in February.

In July 2025, it was announced that CEO Kirk Tanner would be leaving Wendy's to become the CEO of The Hershey Company. Wendy's CFO Ken Cook was named as the company's interim CEO beginning on July 18, 2025. On May 20, 2026, Robert D. "Bob" Wright became President and Chief executive officer of the Company.

On October 28, 2026, Nelson Peltz's Trian Fund Management, with several partners, made an unsolicited buyout proposal of $7.35 per share in cash.

=== Finances ===
Year	Revenue in mil. USD	Net income in mil. USD	Total Assets in mil. USD	Employees	Systemwide restaurants
2005	727.3	−55.2	2,809.5	25,203	3,506
2006	1,243.3	−10.9	1,560.4	24,372	3,585
2007	1,263.7	16.1	1,454.6	26,605	3,688
2008	1,822.8	−479.8	4,645.6	70,290	10,386
2009	3,580.8	5.1	4,975.4	67,500	10,259
2010	3,416.4	−4.3	4,732.7	64,100	10,225
2011	2,431.4	9.9	4,289.1	42,800	6,594
2012	2,505.2	7.1	4,303.2	44,000	6,560
2013	2,487.4	45.5	4,363	37,000	6,557
2014	2,061.1	121.4	4,145.8	31,200	6,515
2015	1,870.3	161.1	4,108.7	21,200	6,479
2016	1,435.4	129.6	3,939.3	12,100	6,537
2017	1,223.4	194	4,096.9	12,100	6,634
2018	1,589.9	460.1			
2019	1,709.0	136.9			
2020	1,733.8	117.8			
2021	1,897	200.4	5,100	14,500	
2022	2,095	177.4	5,500		
