= SPSA =

SPSA can refer to:

- School Plan for Student Achievement (formerly Single Plan for Student Achievement), a required plan for California public schools
- Scottish Police Services Authority, a public body of the Scottish Government responsible for certain central services for police forces
- Southeastern Public Service Authority, the solid waste management agency for the one-million-population region south of Hampton Roads Harbor and the lower James River in Virginia, United States
- Simultaneous perturbation stochastic approximation, a stochastic method for optimization, especially appropriate for multivariable problems
- Southern Political Science Association (SPSA) is an American learned society and national political science association.
