= Victor Posner =

American businessman (1918–2002)

- Historical photo of Victor Posner
- Born: Victor Posner; September 18, 1918; Baltimore, Maryland
- Died: February 11, 2002 (aged 83); Miami Beach, Florida
- Occupations: Investor, businessman, corporate raider
- Known for: LBO artist
- Children: 4; including Steven Posner and Tracy Posner

Victor Posner (September 18, 1918 – February 11, 2002) was an American businessman. He was one of the highest-paid business executives of his generation. He was a pioneer of the leveraged buyout and became notorious for asset stripping.

== Early life ==
Posner was born in Baltimore, Maryland, one of nine children of Russian-Jewish grocers Morris and Mary Posner. Though he left school at age 13, he claimed to have earned his first million dollars by the age of 21 by investing in real estate, although financial records do not confirm this.

== Career ==
Taking advantage of the post-World War II demand for housing in America, in 1948, he developed land and built houses in the Baltimore area, and by 1952, was building more than 1,100 dwellings per year. In 1954, he moved to Miami Beach, Florida, where he continued to invest in real estate and publicly traded companies. He became the head of numerous companies over his career, including Security Management Corporation (owner of rental property in Maryland and Florida), DWG Corporation (Arby's and Royal Crown), NVF Company, Sharon Steel, Pennsylvania Engineering Corporation, Salem Corporation, APL Corporation, Evans Products, Graniteville, and Southeastern Public Service Company.

Posner's primary vehicle was the Deisel-Wemmer Co., a cigar manufacturer and importer based in Ohio, which was founded in 1884. By January 23, 1929, Deisel-Wemmer incorporated as Deisel-Wemmer-Gilbert Corporation (DWG) when acquired by an investment group. DWG was a small outfit and just to keep up market share purchased other small cigar companies like Odin cigars in 1930 and the Bernard Schwartz Cigar Corporation in 1939. The Company on May 15, 1946, changed its name to a simple name, DWG Cigar Corporation. Another series of acquisitions started in 1948 with the Nathan Elson Company following with A. Sensenbrenner & Sons in 1955 and in 1956 Chicago Motor Club Cigar and Reading, Pennsylvania-based Yocum Brothers. With the weakening of the cigar market due to medical advisories, many smokers switched to cigarettes, which were then believed to be safer. DWG then streamlined cigar operations and began looking for other businesses that might suit DWG's wholesale and distribution strength. The New York Stock Exchange delisted DWG in 1965, the company then sold their remaining cigar operations or closed them in 1966. Renamed as DWG Corporation, DWG used its cash from the cigar operation sale to purchase a 12% share of the National Propane Corporation. Security Management Company, headed by Victor Posner, a major investor in DWG saw potential with the company as it was bold to sell its main operation. Posner saw it as a good takeover vehicle and became the controlling interest of DWG.

Acquisition	Industry	Year	Stake
National Propane Corporation	gas	1966	12% share
Wilson Brothers	shirtmaker	January 1967	controlling interest
National Propane Corporation	gas	1967	77%
Southeastern Public Service Company	medium-size utility maintenance and storage company	1969	40%
Southeastern Public Service Company	medium-size utility maintenance and storage company	1970	11%
Graniteville Company	textile manufacturer	1982	51%+
Axia Incorporated		1984	25%
Evans Products	fiber group	1984	
Fischbach Corp.	electrical contracting	1985	

Southeastern Public Service Company subsidiaries

acquisition	industry	Year	Stake
RC Cola	Beverages	1984	100%
Arby's	fast food chain	1984	100%
a Texas grapefruit grove	produce	1984	

Posner usually placed himself as chairman of the board and president of each company that his Security Management Company subsidiaries, DWG or NVF, a vulcanized fiber manufacturer that controlled the other half of Posner's companies. So while collecting reasonable compensation at each company, Posner's overall compensation surpassed major corporation executive pay like General Motors. NVF controlled Sharon Steel Corporation, one of the country's largest specialty steel manufacturers, which led to legal trouble. Posner sat on Sharon Steel's pension trustee board and directed the pension board to invest in Posner-owned properties. In 1971 the SEC sued, after which Posner then agreed not to sit on any pension board for any of his companies. Posner basically let those companies that could get by with minimum maintenance and nothing more do just that. With a run of acquisitions from 1982 and 1985, DWG faced heavy debt. Posner approached one of his backers, Carl Lindner Jr., for assistance. Instead in 1986, Lindner's American Financial Corporation had acquired warrants for more than 30 percent of DWG's shares. Linder backed down from exercising the warrants but forced Posner to reduce his pay from DWG. Posner also started selling off DWG assets: Foxcroft and Enro shirt groups and the citrus operation. A deal for Royal Crown fell through.

Posner has been an associate of Michael Milken.

An investor that Posner contacted to help get Sharon Steel out of bankruptcy, indicated that his lawyer, Andrew Heine, might want to buy Fischbach Corp. Just short of Fischbach being sold, Heine's Granada Investments Company made a bid for all of DWG at $22 per share. Posner converted all DWG options into voting shares but was unable to vote them due to an Ohio judge's order. Granada sued Posner for not taking the bid seriously and Posner sued back stating the bid had no merit. Posner lost the case in 1991 and was forced to pay $5.5 million to Granada. Furthermore, the judge noting other investigations in illegal stock trading in the Fischbach acquisition and of Posner's compensation added three court-appointed directors to DWG's board as audit, compensation, and intercorporate transactions committees.

Posner stopped the appointed directors from presenting their report to the full board forcing Judge Lambros to convert 50% of Security Management Company ownership in DWG to preferred shares and to sell the remaining common stock. Posner resigned as chair of DWG in 1992 and sold his shares to Trian Group, a New York-based investment partnership led by Nelson Peltz and Peter May. Shareholders agreed to drop their longstanding lawsuits claiming that DWG was raided and stripped.

=== Triarc ===
In 1993, DWG's name was changed to Triarc Companies, Inc. Peltz served as CEO of the company from 1993 through 2007, during which time the company sold several holdings in order to focus on food and beverage operations after initially deciding on focusing on soft drinks, fast food, textiles, and liquefied petroleum gas.

Triarc in August 1995 purchased Mistic Brands, Inc. from Joseph Victori Wines, Inc. for $97 million, adding to its beverage holdings of Royal Crown Cola, and turned Mistic Brands around with the addition of new products. Triarc sold off its textiles by 1997.

In 1997, Triarc acquired Snapple Beverages from Quaker Oats, which had bought the company from leveraged buyout firm Thomas H. Lee Partners in 1994 for $1.7 billion. Quaker discontinued the Wendy the Snapple Lady (Wendy Kaufman) advertisements and sold Snapple to Triarc for $300 million in 1994. Triarc reintroduced Wendy the Snapple Lady. Cable Car Beverage Corporation, maker of Stewart's Root Beer and other flavors, was purchased by Triarc in November 1997.

National Propane Corporation was sold in 1999.

Snapple, Mistic, and Stewart's (formerly Cable Car Beverage) was sold by the company to Cadbury Schweppes in 2000 for $1.45 billion In October of that same year, Cadbury Schweppes purchased Royal Crown from Triarc.

== Pioneer of the "hostile takeover" ==
He was said by Forbes magazine to "have the arrogance of a banana republic dictator" and by The New York Times to be the "dean of the corporate takeover". The Economist said, after he died, "he was a pioneer of the hostile takeover of a public company. He was dismissive of the convention previously observed that a takeover should have the agreement of the existing board. He would spot a company whose assets he judged were undervalued, gain control and milk it. Some bits would be sold off, others would be closed. Previously unconsidered treasures, such as the employees' pension fund, would be raided and reinvested in Mr Posner's other companies." Posner was a maverick player in the world of corporate finance. Many of his dealings were alleged to be illegal and he was closely watched by the Securities and Exchange Commission from the mid-1980s on.

=== Sharon Steel ===
In 1969 he initiated the hostile takeover of Sharon Steel, one of the earliest such takeovers in the US. Sharon Steel had a coke plant in Fairmont, West Virginia, a steel plant in Farrell, Pennsylvania, and a coal mine in Rachel, Pennsylvania. His purchase was motivated by the company's low valuation, level cash flow, and low debt. It was intended to become a source of cash for additional investments to capitalize on the rising price of coal during the energy crisis of the early 1970s. His investment would be the forerunner of the leveraged buyout and junk bonds business of the 1980s. Meanwhile, the Fairmont coke plant was one of the worst polluters in the Monongahela Valley and Posner stopped investing in it. It closed in 1979.

=== Decline ===
The late 1980s were the start of his downfall. In 1987, Sharon Steel operated in Chapter 11 bankruptcy protection. At first, Posner stayed on as CEO and chairman as is customary in Chapter 11 business reorganizations. Against Posner's objection, the bankruptcy court appointed a trustee to take over shortly thereafter, since Posner refused to undo some $10 million in payouts to himself and his son Steven (among other questionable transfers of corporate assets to other businesses controlled by Posner), at a time when Sharon Steel was hemorrhaging $2 million per month. On appeal, the Third Circuit affirmed. DWG was the target of a takeover attempt by Granada Investments.

Evans Products operated in Chapter 11 and did not emerge until former chairman and CEO Monford Orloff was brought back to the company and vendors and lenders were assured that Posner would leave the company. In 1988, he pleaded no contest to tax evasion and fraud for inflating the value of land he donated to Miami Christian College in 1975. He was ordered to pay more than $6 million in costs and fines and to devote 20 hours a week for five years to working with the homeless. Also in 1988, the SEC sued Drexel Burnham Lambert and charged Posner and his son Steven with scheming to conceal the Posners' purchase of stock in the electrical contractor Fischbach Corporation. Again, in 1988, a bankruptcy judge ordered him to return several original Norman Rockwell paintings to the Sharon Steel Corporation, which he had removed from the company's headquarters when he acquired the company.

In 1993, both Steven Posner and he were barred by the SEC from being an officer or director of a public company.

Posner died of pneumonia on February 11, 2002, after suffering declining health for several years.

== Personal life ==
Posner was a party in a landmark Florida case involving the validity and permissible scope of prenuptial agreements.

Posner had two children from his first marriage: twins Steven and Gail; and two children from his second marriage to Sari Posner (m. 1960–1966): Tracy and Lance. He was not married at the time of his death. His girlfriend, former actress Brenda Nestor Castellano, was also a business partner.

In 1995, Steven sued his father over alleged mismanagement of his company, Security Management Corporation, claiming that the elder Posner was paying himself too much money and had wrongly removed Steven as a company director. They settled the suit by flipping a coin over the share of more than $200 million worth of property. Steven was killed in a high-speed boat crash near Miami, Florida, on 29 November 2010. Gail died on 19 March 2010 in Miami Beach, Florida.

Shortly before he died, Posner prepared a new will that removed his children and grandchildren as heirs to his estate, which was valued between $200 million and $1 billion. Instead, Brenda Nestor was named as the main beneficiary. Posner's children and his adult grandchildren sued on grounds that he was not competent when he made the changes. The legal entanglements continued until the last lawsuit was settled on April 8, 2015, over the $195 million estate Posner bequeathed to Nestor. The Florida Third District Court of Appeal ruled Tracy Posner Ward could not sue Nestor for $5.8 million in a trust Victor Posner had set aside for Ward's daughter Melody. In addition, the Victor Posner estate got tied up in liens from the Pension Benefit Guarantee Corp., the Federal agency noting that the pension plan sponsored by Posner's estate had a shortfall of $38.8 million, and the plan was terminated by the agency.

Nestor still operates Victor Posner Enterprises, a property development company in Florida.

== Honors ==
Honors include the Victor Posner Center for Communicative Disorders, University of Miami Ear Institute (named in his honor) and an honorary Doctor of Laws Degree, University of Miami. In 1988, $3 million in charitable donations were ordered as part of a sentence for tax evasion. He was also required to work 5000 hours of community service time.
