= Steven Posner =

American financier (1943–2010)

- Born: Steven Neil Posner; January 11, 1943; Baltimore, Maryland
- Died: November 29, 2010 (aged 67); Biscayne Bay, Florida
- Occupation: Businessman
- Spouse: Susan Goldman
- Children: Kelly Posner Gerstenhaber; Sean Posner; Jarrett Posner
- Father: Victor Posner
- Relatives: Tracy Posner (paternal half-sister)

Steven Neil Posner (pronounced POZ-ner. January 11, 1943 – November 29, 2010) was an American corporate raider who worked on a number of major hostile takeovers with his father, Victor Posner, though the two would later have a falling out that resulted in a series of acrimonious lawsuits. A 1989 corporate takeover staged by the Posners led to fraud convictions for Ivan Boesky and Michael Milken levied by the United States Securities and Exchange Commission for their role in improperly assisting the Posners in the attempted deal.

== Biography ==
Posner was born on January 11, 1943, in Baltimore and joined his father's business acquiring and managing corporations. In 1988, the SEC charged that the Posners had colluded with Ivan Boesky and Michael Milken to conceal their stock purchases during the 1984 Posner-led takeover of the Fischbach Corporation. While Boesky and Milken agreed to plead guilty to felony counts in relation to their activities in the Fischbach case, the Posners were required to relinquish the financial gains they had made in the deal and to relinquish ownership stakes they held in other companies.

Posner sued his father in 1995, claiming that the senior Posner had overpaid himself while operating a firm in which his son had an ownership stake. The settlement amount was determined based on the result of a gold coin flipped in front of the judge. After his father's death in 2002, Steven took over the real estate investments that his father had controlled.

== Personal life ==
In 1966, he married Susan Goldman; they had three children: Kelly Posner Gerstenhaber (married to David Gerstenhaber, son of Murray Gerstenhaber); Sean Posner; and Jarrett Posner (married to Elana Waksal, daughter of Samuel D. Waksal). A resident of Miami, Posner died at the age of 67 on November 29, 2010, as a result of an accident in which his boat collided with another boat, killing him and another passenger and leaving a third passenger of the boat severely injured. The crash was described as the result of a mechanical failure in one of the boats as they were traveling next to each other in Biscayne Bay. He was survived by his wife, as well as by a daughter, two sons and five grandchildren.
