= Pasta Pomodoro (restaurant) =

American restaurant chain

- Company type: Private
- Industry: restaurant
- Founded: 1994; 32 years ago San Francisco, California, U.S.
- Founders: Adriano Paganini
- Defunct: December 26, 2016; 9 years ago
- Headquarters: San Francisco, California, U.S.
- Number of locations: 30 (at peak in 2010); 15 (at time of closure in 2016)
- Area served: California

Pasta Pomodoro was an American chain of Italian restaurants. It started as a single restaurant in the Marina District of San Francisco, California in 1994, and subsequently grew to 30 restaurants in the San Francisco Bay Area, Los Angeles and Orange County. The company was headquartered in San Francisco.

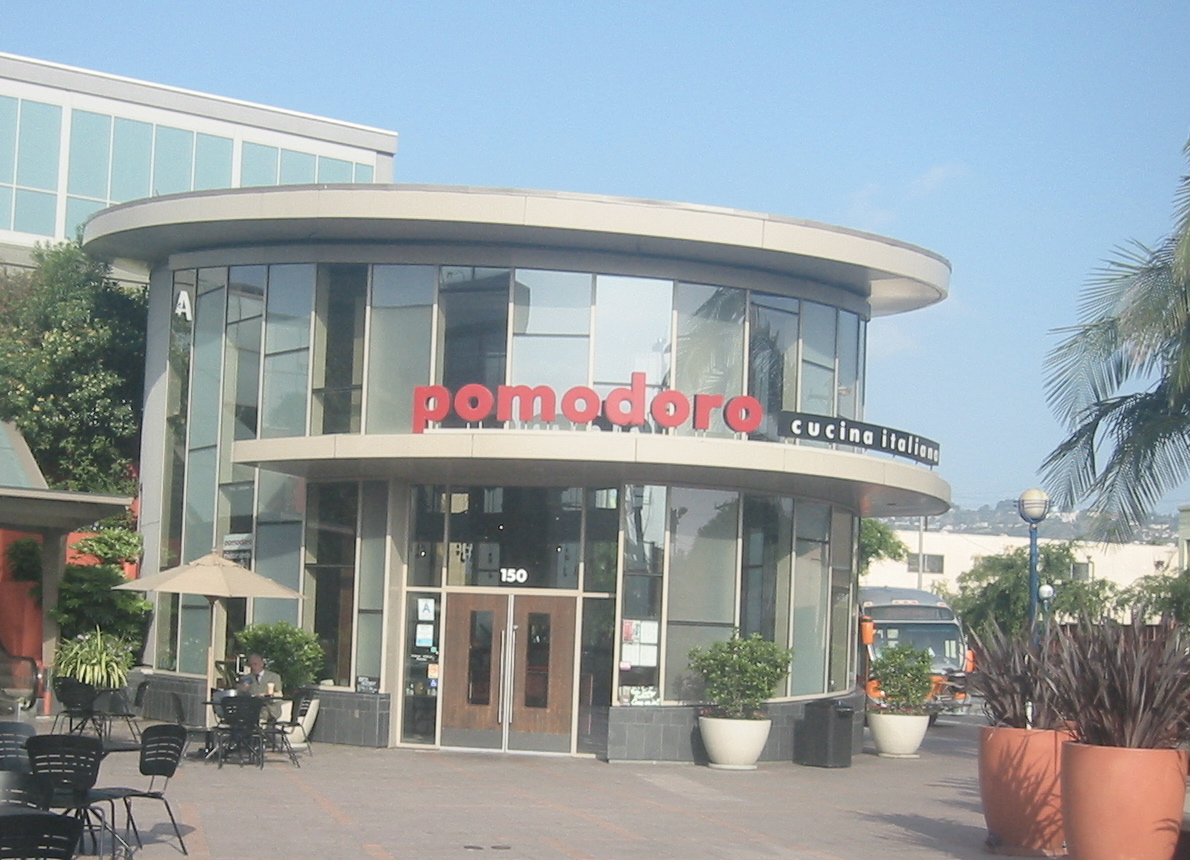
Pasta Pomodoro restaurant in West Hollywood, California

In 2002, Wendy's International acquired a 25% stake in the company. The chain, including the Wendy's share, was acquired by two Bay Area "foodies" in early 2010.

On December 26, 2016, the company abruptly closed all 15 remaining restaurants in the chain, all in the San Francisco Bay Area. Its employees were notified of the closure via text message not to come into work because they had ceased all operations. The name was briefly revived as a pop-up virtual restaurant in San Francisco in late 2020.

== See also ==
- List of Italian restaurants
