= Paul Bilzerian =

American businessman (born 1950)

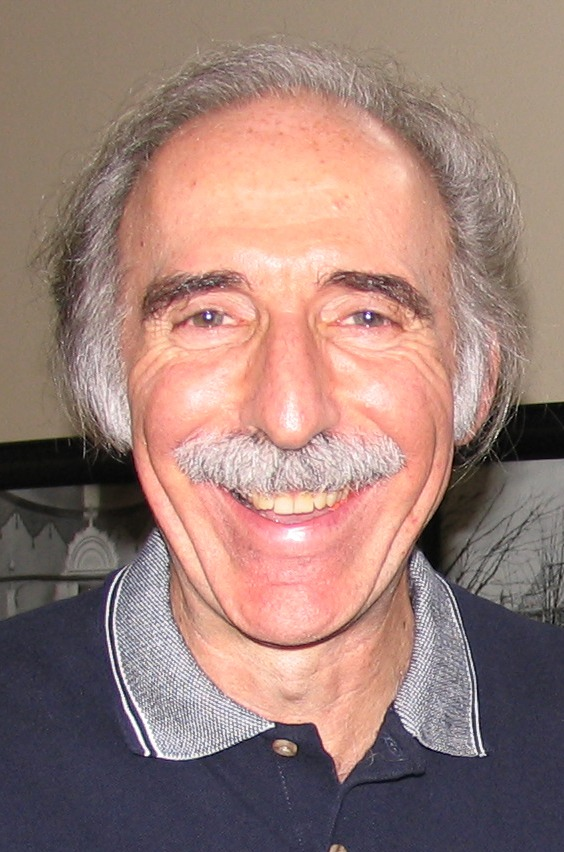
- Bilzerian in 2008
- Born: Paul Alec Bilzerian; 1950 (age 75–76); Miami, Florida, U.S.
- Education: Stanford University (BA); Harvard University (MBA)
- Occupation: Businessman
- Title: President of Singer Corporation (1988–89)
- Criminal charges: Convicted of nine counts including criminal conspiracy, making false statements, securities fraud, tax fraud, and securities law violations
- Criminal penalty: Sentenced to four years in prison and a fine of $1.5 million
- Spouse: Terri L. Steffen (m. 1978)
- Children: 2, including Dan

Paul Alec Bilzerian (born 1950) is an American businessman and former corporate raider. For two years, while he owned a controlling stake, he was the chairman and CEO of Singer Corporation. In 1989, he was convicted on nine felony counts of federal crimes, including criminal conspiracy, making false statements, securities fraud, tax fraud, and securities law violations, and sentenced to four years in prison and a fine of $1.5 million.

In 2024, the Wall Street Journal reported that Bilzerian had "been on the run from the Securities and Exchange Commission for so long [31 years] that he now owes the agency $180 million with interest."

== Early life and education ==
Bilzerian was born in Miami, Florida but grew up in Worcester, Massachusetts in an Armenian-American family. His father Oscar, a civil servant, and his mother divorced while he was in high school. Called into the principal's office of his high school one day in his senior year in September 1968 for violating the dress code by wearing blue jeans, Bilzerian reacted by dropping out of school. He would later describe himself as a "juvenile delinquent".

Starting in December 1968 Bilzerian served—ultimately as a first lieutenant—in the United States Army Signal Corps, passed a high school equivalency exam, and was deployed for a year during the Vietnam War during which time he set up telephone systems, and earned a Bronze Star Medal. He first attended small Clark University in Worcester, then earned a Bachelor of Arts degree from Stanford University in 1975, and a Master of Business Administration degree from Harvard Business School in 1977. He subsequently worked briefly in the treasurer's office of forest products company Crown Zellerbach in San Francisco, assessing merger opportunities.

== Career ==
One of Bilzerian's first business deals was a 1978 investment in a Tampa Bay-area radio station, WPLP. He made it, having borrowed money from his father-in-law, with two Army colleagues from the Vietnam War who had experience in the broadcasting industry. While the radio station had been breaking even when they bought it, it lost $1.4 million in their first year, and he was removed from the board and fired. The station’s performance deteriorated further, it filed for bankruptcy in 1980, and lawsuits were filed by Bilzerian and his former partners against each other.

Bilzerian then joined his father-in-law Harry in the real estate business in 1979, working on shopping center deals in Florida. His real estate investments were highly successful. In 1984, he moved to Sacramento, California, where his father-in-law and another business associate lived.

=== Corporate takeover attempts ===
In August 1985 Bilzerian embarked on his first two high-profile, though unsuccessful, takeover attempts, one of New York clothing manufacturer Cluett Peabody & Company, and the other of Pittsburgh construction company H. H. Robertson. He and partner William Brodovsky, owning 9.9% of the company, offered to buy Cluett for $336 million, for $40 a share, half in cash and half in debt securities, but Cluett's chairman and chief executive responded that "management and the entire board of directors have absolutely no interest in pursuing your proposal." Two weeks later Cluett announced that it had adopted a shareholder rights plan to prevent takeovers financed by the company's borrowing capacity or the sale of the company's assets. After Bilzerian purchased a large stake and raised his bid for the remaining 76% of Cluett Peabody in October, Cluett's adoption of a poison pill led to public criticism of them by Bilzerian. Cluett eventually accepted a competing merger offer by WestPoint Pepperell (now WestPoint Home) for $41 per share (in cash or equivalent value of WestPoint Pepperell common stock); Bilzerian and his fellow investors agreed separately to sell their stake to WestPoint Pepperell for $40 per share plus reimbursement of $7.5 million in expenses.

Bilzerian moved back to Tampa, Florida in 1986. That July he and fellow investors William and Earle I. Mack (sons of New Jersey real estate developer H. Bert Mack) launched a takeover bid against the Hammermill Paper Company, purchasing about 3.3 million Hammermill shares at an average price of roughly $47-per-share, and then offering $52-per-share, and later $57-per-share, to purchase the remainder of the company. Bilzerian's offer was ultimately rejected, and Hammermill sold out to International Paper instead at $64.50 per share, but Bilzerian and his fellow investors still made a profit of $60 million or more from the deal.

=== Singer Corporation ===
In 1987, Bilzerian began a takeover of defense electronics manufacturer Singer Corporation, a sewing machine maker that had turned to producing a flight simulator for training pilots. It became his first successful takeover attempt. In October 1987, it came to light that a group of investors led by Bilzerian had purchased 2.1 million Singer shares in the preceding two months. The October 1987 Black Monday crash spooked competing investors. Singer seemed an unlikely target for a takeover; early reports cast doubt on the idea that the government would permit a hostile takeover of a defense contractor, and the company had already moved its headquarters from Connecticut to takeover-hostile New Jersey in an attempt to fend off a previous takeover attempt by T. Boone Pickens. Bilzerian said that if he bought the company he planned to dispose of its military business. In January 1988, Pickens provided $150 million in financing which helped Bilzerian acquire Singer.

After he engaged in a leveraged buyout of the company and owned a controlling stake, Bilzerian named himself a director and appointed himself chairman, with a 1988 salary of over $600,000; he was its chairman and CEO from February 1988 through June 1989, though he was not involved in day-to-day management. He was litigious; Fortune wrote in March 1988: "He sues not only his takeover targets but the people on his own team: partners, lawyers who try to collect fees, even the bankers who finance him." In November 1989, the company filed for bankruptcy.

== Criminal conviction ==
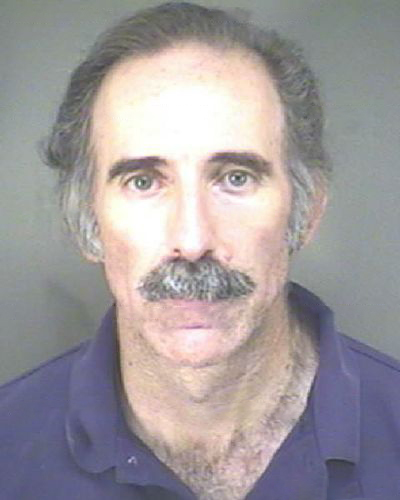
Paul Bilzerian mugshot

In 1986, the government stumbled onto an insider trading scheme in which Drexel Burnham investment banker Dennis Levine was exchanging inside information for cash from trader Ivan Boesky. This in turn led to an indictment of Boyd Jefferies, the owner & chairman of Jefferies & Company. Jefferies cut a deal to testify against three individuals, including Bilzerian. The U.S. Securities and Exchange Commission (SEC) then investigated whether Bilzerian had failed to timely and truthfully file two SEC Schedule 13D filings, and whether he failed to disclose investors in his partnerships.

In May 1988, the SEC began a probe against shopping center developer Edward J. DeBartolo Sr. to determine whether DeBartolo had illegally aided Bilzerian's hostile takeover attempts through illegal "stock parking", in which one party purchases shares in coordination with another to keep legal ownership separated, beneficial ownership disguised, and avoid either party's holdings exceeding federal disclosure law thresholds. DeBartolo's name had been on the U.S. Justice Department's Organized Crime Principal Subjects list, discontinued years earlier. The following year DeBartolo settled a suit against him by the SEC, agreeing to give up $2.7 million in profits from Cluett Peabody and Hammermill Paper Co. stock transactions.

In December 1988, US Attorney for the Southern District of New York Rudy Giuliani announced that Bilzerian had been indicted in federal district court in Manhattan by a federal grand jury. The indictment was on 12 counts of conspiracy, false statements, tax fraud, and securities fraud, including illegal stock parking, and filing false Schedule 13(d) disclosure statements to illegally hide his ownership of stock in takeover targets Cluett Peabody and Hammermill Paper Company in secret accounts at Jefferies, and claims regarding failed takeovers of H. H. Robinson and Armco.

In January 1989, Bilzerian pleaded not guilty to the charges. At trial in May 1989, the government described him as having used "trickery and deceit" to enrich himself. A widespread public view was that Bilzerian's activities were "greenmail", with him profiting by deceiving companies into believing they faced a hostile takeover attempt and scaring them into buying their stock from him at a high price. Some saw Bilzerian as guilty only of making a profit in genuine-but-failed takeover attempts which benefited all investors. In an article in New York magazine as the trial was proceeding, Christopher M. Byron questioned whether the case might stem from "Puritan envy". He further opined that the Department of Justice's motivation was at least in part a need to justify its earlier plea bargain with Boyd Jeffries. Daniel Fischel, at the time a professor at the University of Chicago Law School, argued Bilzerian's actions benefited the shareholders of Cluett Peabody and Hammermill Paper Company.

After eight hours of deliberations over two days in June 1989, the jury found Bilzerian guilty on all nine felony counts including criminal conspiracy, making false statements, securities fraud, tax fraud, and securities law violations, and he faced a maximum sentence of 45 years in prison and a fine of $2.25 million. The jury foreman said Bilzerian "didn't have much credibility" in the eyes of the jurors. In September, U.S. district judge of the U.S. District Court for the Southern District of New York Robert Joseph Ward sentenced Bilzerian to four years in prison and a fine of $1.5 million, saying: "In short, he lies."

Bilzerian was permitted to remain free pending appeal. He appealed, and the Court of Appeals for the Second Circuit ruled against him in January 1991 in a split decision, finding no merit in his argument that his trial had been unfair. He started to serve his sentence in December 1991 at the now-closed Federal Prison Camp, Eglin at Eglin Air Force Base, Florida, and later in a prison in Georgia. Bilzerian was released from prison 13 months later, in December 1992, to serve out the remainder of his sentence under house arrest.

After Bilzerian's release from prison, he became president of Utah-based software company Cimetrix. The New York Times quoted the then-president of the company as saying: "He has a wonderful track record; he is a genius, and he has a Harvard M.B.A." The newspaper then added: "He also has a prison record."

in January 2001, Bilzerian was jailed again, this time for contempt of court by Judge Stanley S. Harris of the U.S. District Court, District of Columbia, who was demanding that he provide better documentation of his assets. It was nearly a year before he was released.

== SEC civil suit and judgment ==
After Bilzerian was convicted, in June 1989 the SEC filed a civil suit against him based on identical charges to force him to disgorge his illegal profits from the takeover attempts.

In 1993, a federal judge ruled in favor of the SEC and ordered Bilzerian to disgorge $33.1 million of profits, plus interest. The total amount to be disgorged was thus $62 million. In January 1994, Bilzerian filed an appeal against the civil judgment in the Court of Appeals for the District of Columbia. However, the court rejected his civil appeal as well.

In order to avoid paying the SEC the judgment that had been rendered against him, Bilzerian said that he did not have any money, and declared bankruptcy twice; in 1989 Bilzerian had estimated that his net worth was $81.4 million ($211,000,000 in current dollar terms), but two years later, after he lost his civil suit to the SEC, he filed for bankruptcy and told the court that he had no assets "other than used clothing, a used Casio watch, and the like". As the SEC continued its efforts to have Bilzerian pay his fine, the judge issued an order in 2000 appointing a receiver to pursue his assets and ordered Bilzerian arrested for civil contempt as he failed to give a full account of his assets, saying he had "made no attempt whatsoever to pay the judgment." Bilzerian then moved to St. Kitts and Nevis to escape the jurisdiction of the U.S. government. He also obtained Armenian citizenship.

Bilzerian first filed for Chapter 11 bankruptcy in August 1991. He listed no assets, though the SEC and other creditors accused him of hiding his assets overseas. He emerged from that bankruptcy having disgorged what he said were all his non-exempt assets in settlement of debts that mostly consisted of claims by the government. In 1999, he tried to put his house in the prestigious Avila neighborhood of Tampa, Florida, up for sale. As the SEC continued its efforts to have Bilzerian pay his fine, the judge issued an order appointing a receiver over Bilzerian’s assets and ordered him arrested for civil contempt as he failed to give a full account of his assets. Bilzerian then filed for bankruptcy again in January 2001, declaring he had non-exempt assets of only $15,805 against $140 million in debts, most of which was for the government's disgorgement judgment. His home, which he called his Taj Mahal, was the largest home in Hillsborough County, a 36,000-square-foot lakefront mansion that included an indoor basketball court and scoreboard, movie theater, 21 bathrooms, elevator, nine-car garage, and a 6,000-square-foot guest house. However, under Florida Bankruptcy Law, the value of his primary residence was shielded from creditors. The SEC alleged that Bilzerian was using bankruptcy as a tactic to block creditors from finding out the true value of his assets, and Bilzerian argued that was a fabrication as the bankruptcy laws require full disclosure and a trustee to take possession of his assets.

On June 11, 2001, while Bilzerian was in prison, FBI agents raided his family's residence on the strength of a sealed warrant and seized computers, files, and a Beretta firearm. The raid appeared to be related to SEC contentions that Bilzerian had concealed his ownership of assets during bankruptcy proceedings by transferring them to trusts and shell corporations, which Bilzerian claimed was a fabrication. Bilzerian unsuccessfully sued the FBI agent for filing a sworn affidavit that contained mostly what Bilzerian alleged were false statements, as a federal judge dismissed his case. Bilzerian was released from prison in January 2002 pursuant to an agreement under which his wife, Terri Steffen, would sell the residence and split the proceeds with the SEC, and transfer most of her wealth to the SEC. Bilzerian was critical of the deal, describing it as the SEC using him "as a hostage to extort money" from his wife. In May 2004, Steffen sold her residence for $2.55 million to a partnership controlled by a Belgian businessman; SEC attorneys approved the unusually low price. According to court documents filed in 2006, Steffen's parents purchased a 99% interest in that partnership three weeks later.

=== 2024 criminal and civil charges ===
In September 2024, Bilzerian was again charged with crimes in the United States. A federal grand jury indicted him and his accountant, and he was charged in federal court on nine counts including conspiracy to commit wire fraud, securities fraud, and conspiracy to defraud the United States by hiding assets in shell corporations to avoid paying his previous SEC fines. If he is convicted of all charges, he will face a maximum sentence of five years in prison for each conspiracy count, and up to 20 years in prison for each wire fraud count.

In a parallel lawsuit, the SEC filed a civil action against him and others in the U.S. District Court for the Southern District of New York, alleging the fraudulent reporting of revenue.

== Personal life ==
Bilzerian married Stanford classmate Terri L. Steffen in 1978, and moved with her to St. Petersburg, Florida. Bilzerian has two sons, Adam and Dan Bilzerian. Both went on to careers as professional poker players.
