= Dan Bilzerian =

American influencer (born 1980)

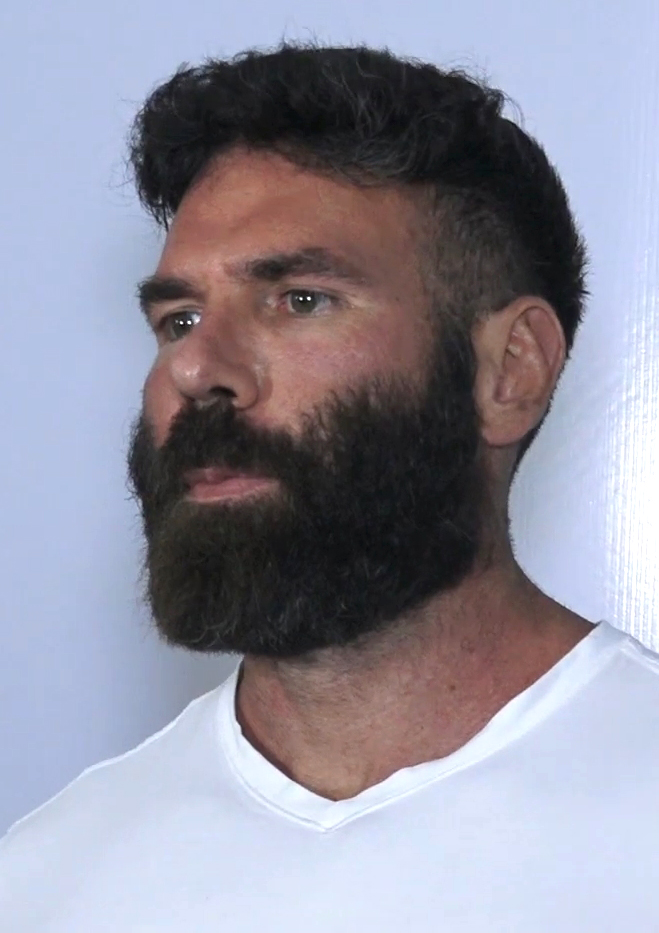
- Bilzerian in 2019
- Born: Daniel Brandon Bilzerian; December 7, 1980 (age 45); Tampa, Florida, U.S.
- Citizenship: United States (since 1980); Armenia (since 2018); Saint Kitts and Nevis
- Education: University of Florida (attended)
- Political party: Republican
- Father: Paul Bilzerian

Instagram information
- Page: Dan Bilzerian
- Followers: 28.9 million

X information
- Handle: @DanBilzerian
- Followers: 2.1 million

YouTube information
- Channel: Dan Bilzerian
- Subscribers: ~215,000
- Last updated: June 13, 2026
- Military career
- Allegiance: United States
- Branch: United States Navy; United States Navy Reserve
- Service years: 1999–2003 (active); 2003–2007 (reserve)
- Rank: Quartermaster 3rd class
- Website: Campaign website

Daniel Brandon Bilzerian (born December 7, 1980) is an American social media personality, businessman, and political activist. He began to gain widespread notability in 2013 for documenting an extravagant playboy lifestyle on social media alongside scantily dressed models, firearms, and high-stakes poker.

In 2026, running as a Republican, Bilzerian launched a congressional campaign in Florida's 6th U.S. House District for the 2026 midterm elections. His campaign drew attention for running antisemitic ads about an opponent and criticizing President Donald Trump, whose removal from office Bilzerian has called for via the Twenty-fifth Amendment. He finished in second place in the Republican primary to the incumbent, Randy Fine.

Bilzerian has also generated controversy for making antisemitic statements independent of his congressional campaign, including Holocaust denial and the dissemination of several conspiracy theories.

== Early life ==
Daniel Brandon Bilzerian was born on December 7, 1980, in Tampa, Florida, the son of corporate takeover specialist Paul Bilzerian and Terri Steffen. He is the brother of fellow poker player Adam Bilzerian; they are half Armenian-American through their father, who was a corporate raider on Wall Street and gave both his sons trust funds. Bilzerian said he studied for four years at the University of Florida, majoring in business and criminology, but dropped out of college to pursue a professional poker career.

== Career ==
=== Lifestyle and initial rise to fame ===
In the 2010s, Bilzerian gained attention for his extravagant playboy lifestyle and photos with luxury cars, guns, money, private jets, and scantily clad women. These photos were regularly posted on various social media platforms, particularly Instagram. Since he gained several million followers there with these photos, Bilzerian was called the "King of Instagram". He has said he has suffered several heart attacks as a result of this lifestyle.

=== Poker ===
Bilzerian played in the 2008 World Series of Poker Main Event, finishing in 180th place. In 2010, he was voted one of the funniest poker players on Twitter by Bluff magazine readers. In November 2011, Bilzerian was one of those sued by the estate of Bradley Ruderman over winnings from poker games that were alleged to have been paid with funds from an illegal Ponzi scheme.

In November 2013, Bilzerian posted an unconfirmed claim that he won $10.8 million in a single night of playing poker. In 2014, he said he had won $50 million during the year, adding that he "doesn't play against professionals anymore and the most he's ever lost in a single session is $3.6 million."

=== Business interests ===
Bilzerian has previously claimed to run the company Ignite International Brands Ltd., which sells electronic cigarettes, CBD oils, water bottles and vodka, among other products. U.S. prosecutors allege that Bilzerian's father, Paul Bilzerian, retained de facto control of Ignite, and improperly funneled money to the company while owing more than $180 million to the U.S. Securities and Exchange Commission. Dan Bilzerian later claimed he was never directly involved with running the company.

Ignite was a public company, headquartered in Toronto, Canada, that began trading in January 2019 under the BILZF ticker and went private in June 2022 The company reportedly lost over $50 million in 2019, mostly on marketing and office rental expenses.

In July 2020, former Ignite president Curtis Heffernan sued Bilzerian for wrongful termination. Heffernan said that he was fired for criticizing Bilzerian's misappropriation of company funds for his lavish lifestyle.

=== Other work ===
Bilzerian has appeared in the films Lone Survivor (2013), The Equalizer, Cat Run 2 (both 2014), and Extraction (2015), and wrote the autobiography The Setup (2021), which recounts his controversial life and lifestyle.

Bilzerian's appearance in Lone Survivor was provided to him in exchange for a $1 million investment in the film.

In 2022, in cooperation with gaming company Novasoft, Bilzerian launched a mobile video game, Save Dan. The game is a first-person shooter, developed for IOS and Android, where players shoot a horde of large-breasted female zombies.

== Legal issues ==
In 2014, Bilzerian sued the producers of the film Lone Survivor, saying he had invested $1 million in the film in exchange for at least eight minutes of screen time and 80 words of dialogue, but his role was reduced to less than one minute and just one line. His lawsuit demanded $1.2 million—the original investment plus 20 percent. The lawsuit was later dropped, and Bilzerian said he had generated $1.5 million in revenue as a result of his investment due to the film's commercial success.

In August 2014, Bilzerian was banned from a Miami nightclub for kicking model Vanessa Castano in the face during a brawl. He said that Castano and another woman attacked his companion. Castano said, "There were two girls standing next to me at the table that were fighting. People started getting shoved and I tried to separate them. Then Dan pushed me off the banquette and once I fell he kicked me in the face." Castano later sued Bilzerian for her injuries. Castano also reportedly asked Bilzerian for $1 million to settle the suit, citing the possibility of greater punitive damages based on his income if the suit went to trial.

In 2014, Bilzerian was involved in a legal matter with pornographic film actor Janice Griffith. Griffith was featured in a photoshoot with Bilzerian for Hustler magazine in April 2014, which involved Bilzerian throwing her off the roof of a house and into a pool. Griffith fell short of the pool, hitting the edge, and broke her foot. She asked Bilzerian for $85,000 for her injuries, which was rejected. In December 2014, she sued both Hustler and Bilzerian. Bilzerian's attorney responded that Griffith was under contract for the event by Hustler, that Hustler hired Bilzerian for the event, and that Bilzerian was not at fault. In January 2015, Hustler's attorney argued that the toss was an "act of God" and that it was not the publisher's fault that Griffith was injured.

On December 9, 2014, Bilzerian was arrested at Los Angeles International Airport on unrelated bomb-making charges. According to the Los Angeles Police Department, Bilzerian was arrested on a fugitive warrant from Nevada and was booked at the LAPD's Pacific Division around 10 pm: "Bilzerian has been charged with violating a law making it a crime to possess an explosive or incendiary device with the intent to manufacture it." He was released from LAPD custody on the day of his arrest after charges were dropped but was scheduled to be arraigned in January 2015 in Clark County, Nevada. In February 2015, Bilzerian pleaded no contest to a misdemeanor charge of "negligently failing to extinguish a fire in the open" and was fined $17,231.50.

== Political career and views ==
In June 2015, Bilzerian announced his bid to run in the 2016 United States presidential election. By December of that year, however, he had begun supporting Donald Trump, noting his lack of political correctness and pro-gun stance. On a 2016 appearance on Larry King Now, Bilzerian praised Trump's "raw and unfiltered" public persona.

In 2024, Bilzerian condemned Israel and expressed support for Hamas amidst the Gaza war, referring to it as a "resistance organization" and calling its former leader Yahya Sinwar "a hero". He has claimed that Israel "wanted Oct. 7 to happen" and called allegations of sexual and gender-based violence in the October 7 attacks "bull—t."

In April 2026, Bilzerian criticized Trump amid the 2026 Iran War, after Trump threatened Iran, writing "A whole civilization will die tonight, never to be brought back again". Bilzerian called Trump "an extreme narcissist", and called on Trump's cabinet to invoke the Twenty-fifth Amendment.

=== 2026 congressional campaign ===
In April 2026, Bilzerian announced that he would be running in the Republican primary for Florida's 6th congressional district against incumbent Representative Randy Fine. Bilzerian is a vocal critic of Fine, who is Jewish and is known for his stridently pro-Israel sentiments.

Bilzerian's campaign was endorsed by Carrie Prejean, Kenneth O'Keefe, Leonarda Jonie, Jake Shields, Sneako, and Brian McGinnis. Without explicitly endorsing Fine, House Democratic leader Hakeem Jeffries urged voters to reject Bilzerian after Bilzerian posted an AI-generated ad on his social media platforms calling Fine a "fat Jew", a "Satanic whore", and "Shylock", while praising Adolf Hitler.

=== Antisemitic statements and conspiracy theories ===
Bilzerian generated controversy for making antisemitic statements as early as 2010. He has falsely claimed that the Jewish people "perpetrated" the Holodomor in Soviet Ukraine, assassinated John F. Kennedy in 1963 and Muammar Gaddafi in 2011, created the "transgender nonsense", and orchestrated the September 11 attacks and the Iraq War, among other false assertions and antisemitic conspiracy theories.

In a 2024 interview with Piers Morgan, Bilzerian argued that Judaism "promotes supremacy and rape, and steals from other people as long as they're not Jewish" and that "most of the problems today are caused by Jewish supremacy". He also said that all Israeli Jews are "Eastern European Ashkenazi Jews" and "don't have actual Hebrew DNA". He has called Randy Fine a "fat Jew" and called antisemitism "a made-up term."

Bilzerian also said that Jews "control the media".

He has promoted Holocaust denial, saying, "I would bet my entire net worth that it was less than six million." Bilzerian later said that Jews "killed more Christians than six million" and "basically invented genocide".

Bilzerian has claimed partial Jewish descent, writing in his 2021 memoir The Setup that he is "part Jewish." During his 2026 congressional campaign, amid renewed attention to the passage, he posted on X, "12% doesn't make you a jew."

== Personal life ==
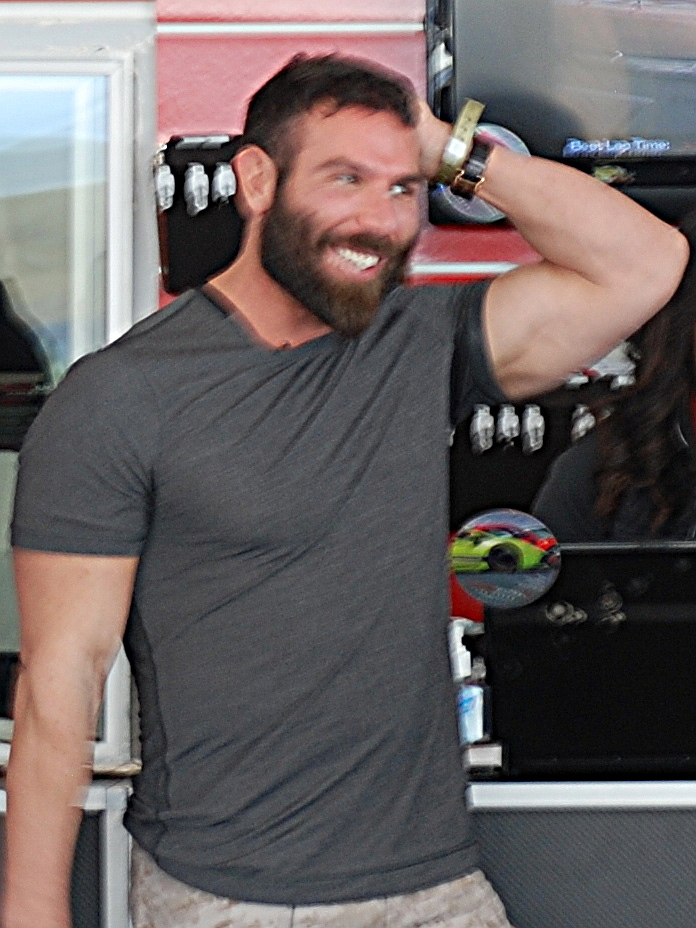
Bilzerian in 2013

Due to his drug abuse, Bilzerian reportedly suffered two heart attacks before the age of 32. He has been open about his steroid and TRT use for years.

=== Military service ===
Bilzerian served in the U.S. Navy, enlisting in 1999. He underwent Navy SEAL selection and training, but days before finishing, was dropped from the program after a safety violation. He served active duty until 2003, and held the E-4 rank of Quartermaster. Bilzerian continued with the United States Navy Reserve until 2007, and was honorably discharged.

=== Citizenship ===
On August 28, 2018, Bilzerian flew to Armenia with his brother Adam and father Paul to take their oaths to obtain Armenian citizenship and join the Armed Forces of Armenia.

On that same trip he visited the Republic of Artsakh where he visited a shooting range, and fired weapons there. The government of Azerbaijan sent a note of protest to the United States over these actions due to the contested status of Artsakh, and summoned U.S. Chargé d'Affaires William Gill to take an official note of protest addressed to the State Department. A court in Baku issued an arrest warrant for Bilzerian and put him on the international wanted list. Two years later, Bilzerian and other members of his family donated $250,000 to the Armenia Fund to support Armenia and Artsakh during the Second Nagorno-Karabakh War, declaring that he was "very disappointed that Azerbaijan decided to attack the Armenian people."

In May 2026, Bilzerian revealed that he holds a Saint Kitts and Nevis passport; such passports are available to citizens.

== In popular culture ==
In October 2016, American rapper T-Pain released the song "Dan Bilzerian".

== Filmography ==
Year	Title	Role	Notes
2013	Olympus Has Fallen		Uncredited
2013	Lone Survivor	SCPO Daniel R. Healy	Uncredited
2014	The Other Woman	Handsome Man at Bar	Uncredited
2014	The Equalizer	Teddy's Guy	
2014	Cat Run 2	Cordray	
2015	Extraction	Higgins	
2016	War Dogs	Himself	Uncredited cameo

== Electoral history ==
=== Results ===
2026 United States House of Representatives elections in Florida, District 6, Republican Primary
Party	Candidate	Votes	%
Republican	Randy Fine (incumbent)	51,076	56.9
Republican	Dan Bilzerian	16,773	18.7
Republican	Aaron Baker	12,070	13.5
Republican	Charles Gambaro	8,713	9.7
Republican	Manuel Asensio	1,075	1.2
Total votes		89,707	100.0

== Bibliography ==
- Bilzerian, Dan (2021). The Setup. ISBN 978-1737550112.
