= Leveraged buyout =

Acquired control over a company by the purchase of its shares with borrowed money

A leveraged buyout (LBO) is one company's acquisition of another company using a significant amount of borrowed money (leverage) to meet the cost of acquisition. The assets of the company being acquired are often used as collateral for the loans, along with the assets of the acquiring company. The use of debt, which normally has a lower cost of capital than equity, serves to reduce the overall cost of financing the acquisition. This is done at the risk of magnified cash flow losses should the acquisition perform poorly after the buyout.

The cost of debt is lower because interest payments often reduce corporate income tax liability, whereas dividend payments normally do not. This reduced cost of financing allows greater gains to accrue to the equity, and, as a result, the debt serves as a lever to increase the returns to the equity.

The term LBO is usually employed when a financial sponsor acquires a company. However, many corporate transactions are partially funded by bank debt, thus effectively also representing an LBO. LBOs can have many different forms such as management buyout (MBO), management buy-in (MBI), secondary buyout and tertiary buyout, among others, and can occur in growth situations, restructuring situations, and insolvencies. LBOs mostly occur in private companies, but can also be employed with public companies (in a so-called PtP transaction – public-to-private).

As financial sponsors increase their returns by employing a very high leverage (i.e., a high ratio of debt to equity), they have an incentive to employ as much debt as possible to finance an acquisition. This has, in many cases, led to situations in which companies were "over-leveraged", meaning that they did not generate sufficient cash flows to service their debt, which in turn led to insolvency or to debt-to-equity swaps in which the equity owners lose control over the business to the lenders.

== Characteristics ==
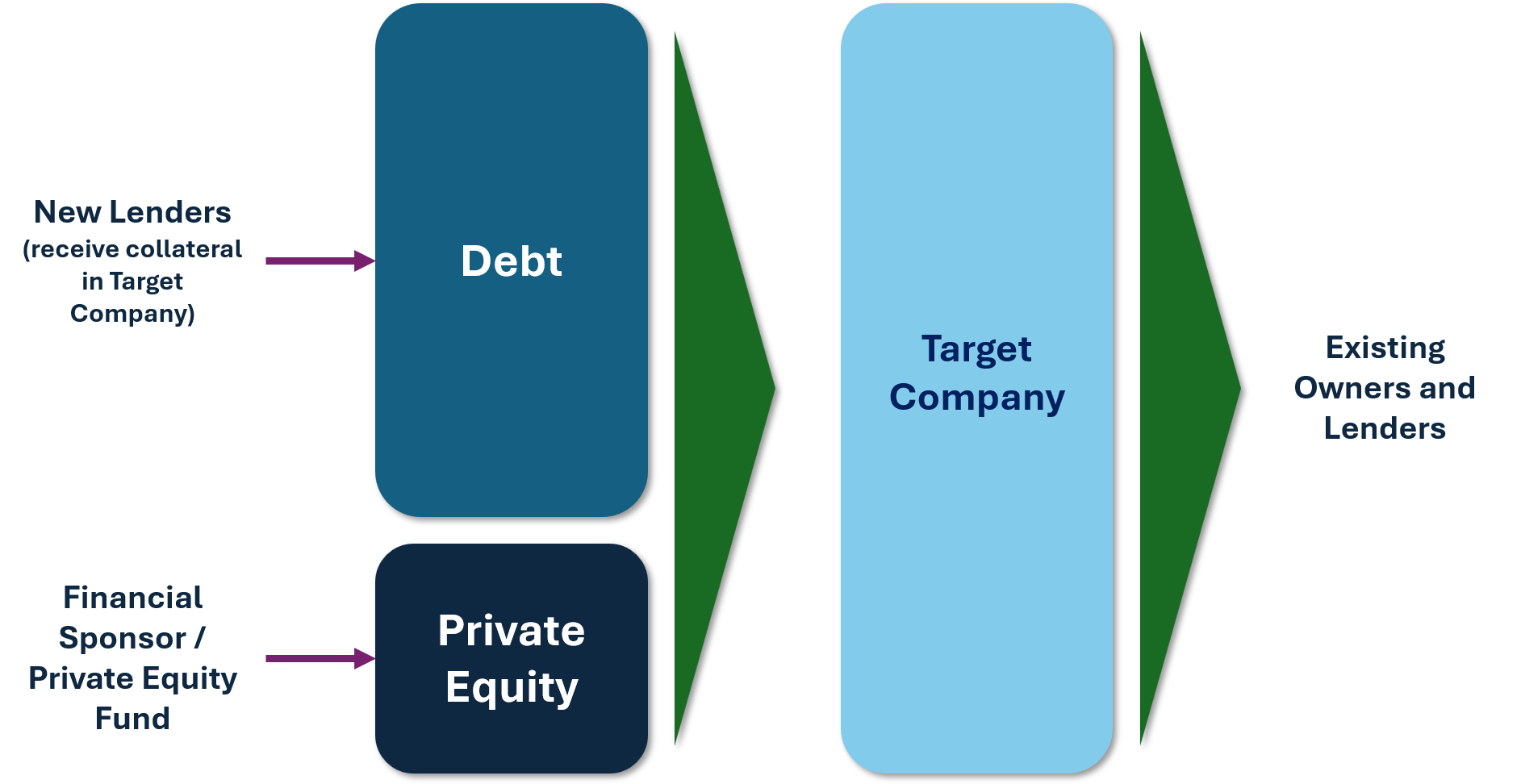
Diagram of the basic structure of a generic leveraged buyout transaction

LBOs have become attractive as they usually represent a win–win situation for the financial sponsor and the banks: the financial sponsor can increase the rate of returns on its equity by employing the leverage; banks can make substantially higher margins when supporting the financing of LBOs as compared to usual corporate lending, because the interest chargeable is that much higher. Banks can increase their likelihood of being repaid by obtaining collateral or security.

The amount of debt that banks are willing to provide to support an LBO varies greatly and depends, among other things, on the quality of the asset to be acquired, including its cash flows, history, growth prospects, and hard assets; experience and equity supplied by the financial sponsor; and the overall economic environment.

Debt volumes of up to 100% of a purchase price have been provided to companies with very stable and secured cash flows, such as real estate portfolios with rental income secured by long-term rental agreements. Typically, debt of 40–60% of the purchase price may be offered. Debt ratios vary significantly among regions and target industries.

Debt for an acquisition comes in two types: senior and junior. Senior debt is secured with the target company's assets and has lower interest rates. Junior debt has no security interests and higher interest rates. In big purchases, debt and equity can come from more than one party. Banks can also syndicate debt, meaning they sell pieces of the debt to other banks. Seller notes (or vendor loans) can also happen when the seller uses part of the sale to give the purchaser a loan. In LBOs, the only collateral is the company's assets and cash flows. The financial sponsor can treat their investment as common equity, preferred equity, or other securities. Preferred equity pays dividends and has priority over common equity.

In addition to the amount of debt that can be used to fund leveraged buyouts, it is also important to understand the types of companies that private equity firms look for when considering leveraged buyouts.

While different firms pursue different strategies, there are some characteristics that hold true across many types of leveraged buyouts:

- Stable cash flows – The company being acquired in a leveraged buyout must have sufficiently stable cash flows to pay its interest expense and repay debt principal over time. So mature companies with long-term customer contracts and/or relatively predictable cost structures are commonly acquired in LBOs.
- Relatively low fixed costs – Fixed costs create substantial risk for private-equity firms because companies still have to pay them even if their revenues decline.
- Relatively little existing debt – The "math" in an LBO works because the private-equity firm adds more debt to a company's capital structure, and then the company repays it over time, resulting in a lower effective purchase price; it is tougher to make a deal work when a company already has a high debt balance.
- Valuation – Private-equity firms prefer companies that are moderately undervalued to appropriately valued; they prefer not to acquire companies trading at extremely high valuation multiples (relative to the sector) because of the risk that valuations could decline.
- Strong management team – Ideally, the C-level executives will have worked together for a long time and will also have some vested interest in the LBO by rolling over their shares when the deal takes place.

== History ==
=== Origins ===
The first leveraged buyout may have been the purchase by McLean Industries, Inc. of Pan-Atlantic Steamship Company in January 1955 and Waterman Steamship Corporation in May 1955. Under the terms of that transaction, McLean borrowed $42 million and raised an additional $7 million through an issue of preferred stock. When the deal closed, $20 million of Waterman cash and assets were used to retire $20 million of the loan debt.

Lewis Cullman's acquisition of Orkin Exterminating Company in 1964 is among the first significant leveraged buyout transactions. Similar to the approach employed in the McLean transaction, the use of publicly traded holding companies as investment vehicles to acquire portfolios of investments in corporate assets was a relatively new trend in the 1960s, popularized by the likes of Warren Buffett (Berkshire Hathaway) and Victor Posner (DWG Corporation), and later adopted by Nelson Peltz (Triarc), Saul Steinberg (Reliance Insurance) and Gerry Schwartz (Onex Corporation). These investment vehicles would utilize a number of the same tactics and target the same type of companies as more traditional leveraged buyouts and in many ways could be considered a forerunner of the later private-equity firms. In fact, it is Posner who is often credited with coining the term "leveraged buyout" or "LBO."

The leveraged buyout boom of the 1980s was conceived in the 1960s by a number of corporate financiers, most notably Jerome Kohlberg, Jr. and later his protégé Henry Kravis. Working for Bear Stearns at the time, Kohlberg and Kravis, along with Kravis' cousin George Roberts, began a series of what they described as "bootstrap" investments. Many of the target companies lacked a viable or attractive exit for their founders, as they were too small to be taken public and the founders were reluctant to sell out to competitors: thus, a sale to an outside buyer might prove attractive. In the following years, the three Bear Stearns bankers would complete a series of buyouts including Stern Metals (1965), Incom (a division of Rockwood International, 1971), Cobblers Industries (1971), and Boren Clay (1973) as well as Thompson Wire, Eagle Motors and Barrows through their investment in Stern Metals. By 1976, tensions had built up between Bear Stearns and Kohlberg, Kravis and Roberts leading to their departure and the formation of Kohlberg Kravis Roberts in that year.

=== 1980s ===
In January 1982, former U.S. Secretary of the Treasury William E. Simon and a group of investors acquired Gibson Greetings, a producer of greeting cards, for $80 million, of which only $1 million was rumored to have been contributed by the investors. By mid-1983, just sixteen months after the original deal, Gibson completed a $290 million IPO and Simon made approximately $66 million. The success of the Gibson Greetings investment attracted the attention of the wider media to the nascent boom in leveraged buyouts. Between 1980 and 1990, there were 180 leveraged buyouts involving firms with an aggregate book value of $39.2 billion.

In the summer of 1984 the LBO was a target for virulent criticism by Paul Volcker, then chairman of the Federal Reserve, by John S.R. Shad, chairman of the U.S. Securities and Exchange Commission, and other senior financiers. The gist of all the denunciations was that top-heavy reversed pyramids of debt were being created and that they would soon crash, destroying assets and jobs.

During the 1980s, constituencies within acquired companies and the media ascribed the "corporate raid" label to many private equity investments, particularly those that featured a hostile takeover of the company, perceived asset stripping, major layoffs or other significant corporate restructuring activities. Among the most notable investors to be labeled corporate raiders in the 1980s included Carl Icahn, Victor Posner, Nelson Peltz, Robert M. Bass, T. Boone Pickens, Harold Clark Simmons, Kirk Kerkorian, Sir James Goldsmith, Saul Steinberg and Asher Edelman. Carl Icahn developed a reputation as a ruthless corporate raider after his hostile takeover of TWA in 1985. Many of the corporate raiders were onetime clients of Michael Milken, whose investment banking firm, Drexel Burnham Lambert helped raise blind pools of capital with which corporate raiders could make a legitimate attempt to take over a company and provided high-yield debt financing of the buyouts.

One of the final major buyouts of the 1980s proved to be its most ambitious and marked both a high-water mark and a sign of the beginning of the end of the boom that had begun nearly a decade earlier. In 1989, KKR closed in on a $31.1 billion takeover of RJR Nabisco. It was, at that time and for over 17 years following, the largest leveraged buyout in history. The event was chronicled in the book (and later the movie) Barbarians at the Gate: The Fall of RJR Nabisco. KKR would eventually prevail in acquiring RJR Nabisco at $109 per share, marking a dramatic increase from the original announcement that Shearson Lehman Hutton would take RJR Nabisco private at $75 per share. A fierce series of negotiations and horse-trading ensued which pitted KKR against Shearson Lehman Hutton and later Forstmann Little & Co. Many of the major banking players of the day, including Morgan Stanley, Goldman Sachs, Salomon Brothers, and Merrill Lynch were actively involved in advising and financing the parties. After Shearson Lehman's original bid, KKR quickly introduced a tender offer to obtain RJR Nabisco for $90 per share – a price that enabled it to proceed without the approval of RJR Nabisco's management. RJR's management team, working with Shearson Lehman and Salomon Brothers, submitted a bid of $112, a figure they felt certain would enable them to outflank any response by Kravis's team. KKR's final bid of $109, while a lower dollar figure, was ultimately accepted by the board of directors of RJR Nabisco. At $31.1 billion of transaction value, RJR Nabisco was the largest leveraged buyout in history until the 2007 buyout of TXU Energy by KKR and Texas Pacific Group. In 2006 and 2007, a number of leveraged buyout transactions were completed that for the first time surpassed the RJR Nabisco leveraged buyout in terms of nominal purchase price. However, adjusted for inflation, none of the leveraged buyouts of the 2006–2007 period surpassed RJR Nabisco.

By the end of the 1980s the excesses of the buyout market were beginning to show, with the bankruptcy of several large buyouts including Robert Campeau's 1988 buyout of Federated Department Stores, the 1986 buyout of the Revco drug stores, Walter Industries, FEB Trucking and Eaton Leonard. Additionally, the RJR Nabisco deal was showing signs of strain, leading to a recapitalization in 1990 that involved the contribution of $1.7 billion of new equity from KKR.

Drexel Burnham Lambert was the investment bank most responsible for the boom in private equity during the 1980s due to its leadership in the issuance of high-yield debt. Drexel reached an agreement with the government in which it pleaded nolo contendere (no contest) to six felonies – three counts of stock parking and three counts of stock manipulation. It also agreed to pay a fine of $650 million – at the time, the largest fine ever levied under securities laws. Milken left the firm after his own indictment in March 1989. On February 13, 1990, after being advised by United States Secretary of the Treasury Nicholas F. Brady, the U.S. Securities and Exchange Commission (SEC), the New York Stock Exchange, and the Federal Reserve, Drexel Burnham Lambert officially filed for Chapter 11 bankruptcy protection.

=== Age of the mega-buyout ===
The combination of decreasing interest rates, loosening lending standards, and regulatory changes for publicly traded companies (specifically the Sarbanes–Oxley Act) would set the stage for the largest boom the private equity industry had seen. Marked by the buyout of Dex Media in 2002, large multibillion-dollar U.S. buyouts could once again obtain significant high yield debt financing from various banks and larger transactions could be completed. By 2004 and 2005, major buyouts were once again becoming common, including the acquisitions of Toys "R" Us, The Hertz Corporation, Metro-Goldwyn-Mayer and SunGard in 2005.

As 2005 ended and 2006 began, new "largest buyout" records were set and surpassed several times with nine of the top ten buyouts at the end of 2007 having been announced in an 18-month window from the beginning of 2006 through the middle of 2007. In 2006, private-equity firms bought 654 U.S. companies for $375 billion, representing 18 times the level of transactions closed in 2003. Additionally, U.S.-based private-equity firms raised $215.4 billion in investor commitments to 322 funds, surpassing the previous record set in 2000 by 22% and 33% higher than the 2005 fundraising total. The following year, despite the onset of turmoil in the credit markets in the summer, saw yet another record year of fundraising with $302 billion of investor commitments to 415 funds. Among the mega-buyouts completed during the 2006 to 2007 boom were: EQ Office, HCA, Alliance Boots and TXU.

In July 2007, turmoil that had been affecting the mortgage markets spilled over into the leveraged finance and high-yield debt markets. The markets had been highly robust during the first six months of 2007, with highly issuer friendly developments including PIK and PIK Toggle (interest is "Payable In Kind") and covenant light debt widely available to finance large leveraged buyouts. July and August saw a notable slowdown in issuance levels in the high yield and leveraged loan markets with only few issuers accessing the market. Uncertain market conditions led to a significant widening of yield spreads, which coupled with the typical summer slowdown led many companies and investment banks to put their plans to issue debt on hold until the autumn. However, the expected rebound in the market after Labor Day 2007 did not materialize and the lack of market confidence prevented deals from pricing. By the end of September, the full extent of the credit situation became obvious as major lenders including Citigroup and UBS AG announced major writedowns due to credit losses. The leveraged finance markets came to a near standstill. As 2007 ended and 2008 began, it was clear that lending standards had tightened and the era of "mega-buyouts" had come to an end. Nevertheless, private equity continues to be a large and active asset class and the private-equity firms, with hundreds of billions of dollars of committed capital from investors are looking to deploy capital in new and different transactions.

In September 2025, Electronic Arts announced it was being taken private for $55bn, the biggest leveraged buyout in history. The consortium of buyers include Saudi Arabia's Public Investment Fund (PIF), Silver Lake, and Jared Kushner's Affinity Partners.

== Management buyouts ==
A special case of a leveraged acquisition is a management buyout (MBO). In an MBO, the incumbent management team (that usually has no or close to no shares in the company) acquires a sizeable portion of the shares of the company. Similar to an MBO is an MBI (Management Buy In) in which an external management team acquires the shares. An MBO can occur for a number of reasons; e.g.,

1. Ownership wishes to retire and chooses to sell the company to trusted members of management
2. Ownership has lost faith in the future of the business and is willing to sell it to management (which believes in the future of the business) in order to retain some value for investment in the business
3. Management sees a value in the business that ownership does not see and does not wish to pursue

In most situations, the management team does not have enough money to fund the equity needed for the acquisition (to be combined with bank debt to constitute the purchase price) so that management teams work together with financial sponsors to part-finance the acquisition. For the management team, the negotiation of the deal with the financial sponsor (i.e., who gets how many shares of the company) is a key value creation lever.

Financial sponsors are often sympathetic to MBOs as in these cases they are assured that management believes in the future of the company and has an interest in value creation (as opposed to being solely employed by the company).

There are no clear guidelines as to how big a share the management team must own after the acquisition in order to qualify as an MBO, as opposed to a normal leveraged buyout in which the management invests together with the financial sponsor. However, in the usual use of the term, an MBO is a situation in which the management team initiates and actively pushes the acquisition.

MBO situations often lead management teams into a dilemma as they face a conflict of interest, being interested in a low purchase price personally while at the same time being employed by the owners who obviously have an interest in a high purchase price. Owners usually react to this situation by offering a deal fee to the management team if a certain price threshold is reached. Financial sponsors usually react to this again by offering to compensate the management team for a lost deal fee if the purchase price is low. Other mechanisms to handle this problem are earn-outs (purchase price being contingent on reaching certain future profitabilities).

There probably are just as many successful MBOs as there are unsuccessful ones. Crucial for the management team at the beginning of the process is the negotiation of the purchase price and the deal structure (including the envy ratio) and the selection of the financial sponsor.

== Secondary and tertiary buyouts ==
A secondary buyout is a form of leveraged buyout where both the buyer and the seller are private-equity firms or financial sponsors (i.e., a leveraged buyout of a company that was acquired through a leveraged buyout). A secondary buyout will often provide a clean break for the selling private-equity firms and its limited partner investors. Historically, given that secondary buyouts were perceived as distressed sales by both seller and buyer, limited partner investors considered them unattractive and largely avoided them.

The increase in secondary buyout activity in 2000s was driven in large part by an increase in capital available for the leveraged buyouts. Often, selling private-equity firms pursue a secondary buyout for a number of reasons:

- Sales to strategic buyers and IPOs may not be possible for niche or undersized businesses.
- Secondary buyouts may generate liquidity more quickly than other routes (i.e., IPOs).
- Some kinds of businesses – e.g., those with relatively slow growth but which generate high cash flows – may be more appealing to private-equity firms than they are to public stock investors or other corporations.

Often, secondary buyouts have been successful if the investment has reached an age where it is necessary or desirable to sell rather than hold the investment further or where the investment had already generated significant value for the selling firm.

Secondary buyouts differ from secondaries or secondary market purchases which typically involve the acquisition of portfolios of private equity assets including limited partnership stakes and direct investments in corporate securities.

If a company that was acquired in a secondary buyout gets sold to another financial sponsor, the resulting transaction is called a tertiary buyout.

=== Failures ===
Some LBOs before 2000 have resulted in corporate bankruptcy, such as Robert Campeau's 1988 buyout of Federated Department Stores and the 1986 buyout of the Revco drug stores. Many LBOs of the boom period 2005–2007 were also financed with too high a debt burden. The failure of the Federated buyout was a result of excessive debt financing, comprising about 97% of the total consideration, which led to large interest payments that exceeded the company's operating cash flow.

Often, instead of declaring insolvency, the company negotiates a debt restructuring with its lenders. The financial restructuring might entail that the equity owners inject some more money in the company and the lenders waive parts of their claims. In other situations, the lenders inject new money and assume the equity of the company, with the present equity owners losing their shares and investment. The operations of the company are not affected by the financial restructuring. Nonetheless, the financial restructuring requires significant management attention and may lead to customers losing faith in the company.

The outcome of litigation attacking a leveraged buyout as a fraudulent transfer will generally turn on the financial condition of the target at the time of the transaction – that is, whether the risk of failure was substantial and known at the time of the LBO, or whether subsequent unforeseeable events led to the failure. The analysis historically depended on "dueling" expert witnesses and was notoriously subjective, expensive, and unpredictable. However, courts are increasingly turning toward more objective, market-based measures.

In addition, the Bankruptcy Code includes a so-called "safe harbor" provision, preventing bankruptcy trustees from recovering settlement payments to the bought-out shareholders. In 2009, the U.S. Court of Appeals for the Sixth Circuit held that such settlement payments could not be avoided, irrespective of whether they occurred in an LBO of a public or private company. To the extent that public shareholders are protected, insiders and secured lenders become the primary targets of fraudulent transfer actions.

Banks have reacted to failed LBOs by requiring a lower debt-to-equity ratio, thus increasing the "skin in the game" for the financial sponsor and reducing the debt burden.

== See also ==
- Bootstrap funding
- Divisional buyout
- Envy ratio
- History of private equity and venture capital
- List of private equity firms
- Vulture capitalist
