= Management buy-in =

Of a large interest in a company

A management buy-in (MBI) occurs when a manager or a management team from outside the company raises the necessary finance, buys it, and becomes the company's new management. A management buy-in team often competes with other purchasers in the search for a suitable business. Usually, the team will be led by a manager with significant experience at managing director level.

The difference to a management buy-out is in the position of the purchaser: in the case of a buy-out, they are already working for the company. In the case of a buy-in, however, the manager or management team is from another source.

== Buy-in management buyout (BIMBO) ==
A buy-in management buyout is a combination of a management buy-in and a management buyout. In the case of a buy-in management buy-out, the team that buy out the company are a combination of existing managers, who retain a stake in the company, and individuals from outside the company who will join the management team following the buy-out. The term BIMBO was first used in respect of the purchase of Chaucer Foods, a Hull based crouton manufacturer, from Hazlewood Foods plc in 1990.

== See also ==
- Envy ratio
- Takeover
