= Burt Ward =

American actor (born 1945)

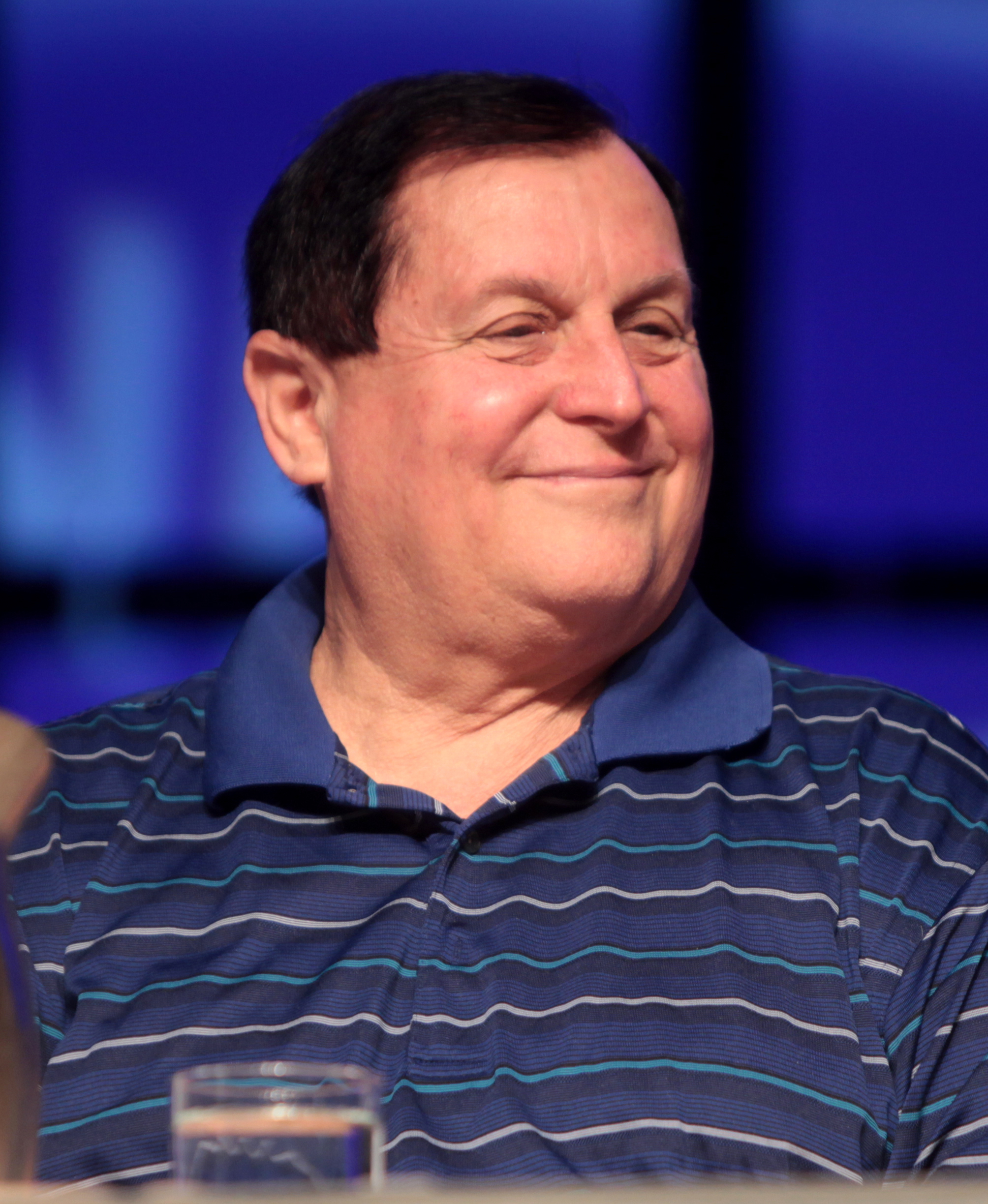
- Ward speaking at the Phoenix Comicon in June 2014
- Born: Bert John Gervis Jr. July 6, 1945 (age 81); Los Angeles, California, U.S.
- Occupations: Actor; animal welfare activist; businessman
- Years active: 1965–present
- Known for: Batman; The New Adventures of Batman
- Spouses: Bonney Lindsey (m. 1965; div. 1967); Kathy Kersh (m. 1967; div. 1969); Mariana Torchia (m. 1985; div. 1989); Tracy Posner (m. 1990)
- Children: 2
- Awards: Inkpot Award (2014)

Burt Ward (born Bert John Gervis Jr. /ˈdʒɜːrvɪs/; July 6, 1945) is an American actor, animal welfare activist and businessman. He played Dick Grayson's Robin, the sidekick of Batman (played by Adam West), in the television series Batman (1966–1968), its theatrical feature film, the Saturday morning animated series The New Adventures of Batman (1977), the two-episode pilot Legends of the Superheroes (1979), the animated reunion films Batman: Return of the Caped Crusaders (2016) and Batman vs. Two-Face (2017), and the live-action television event Crisis on Infinite Earths (2019).

== Early life ==
Ward was born Bert John Gervis Jr., on July 6, 1945, in Los Angeles. His father, Bert Gervis Sr., was the owner of a traveling ice show called "Rhapsody On Ice". At age two, Ward was listed in the magazine Strange as It Seems as a professional ice skater. Growing up, he was an avid reader of comic books such as Superman and Superboy, and enjoyed the action-adventure show Adventures of Superman. He acquired the nickname "Sparky" in his youth, possibly from the sparks his skates kicked up during his routines or his energetic nature. He excelled in high school sport activities such as football, track, and wrestling; he was also a member of the chess club and is a practitioner of Taekwondo. After graduation, he enrolled in college while working part-time for his father's real-estate company.

== Career ==
In October 1965, Ward auditioned for the role of Robin. West and Ward were up against Lyle Waggoner and Peter Deyell for the roles of Batman and Robin, respectively. Selected for the role of Robin, Ward thought people would find Gervis (the "G" is soft, as in "gentleman") hard to pronounce and adopted his mother's maiden name, Ward. He also changed the spelling of Bert to "Burt" to add "punch".

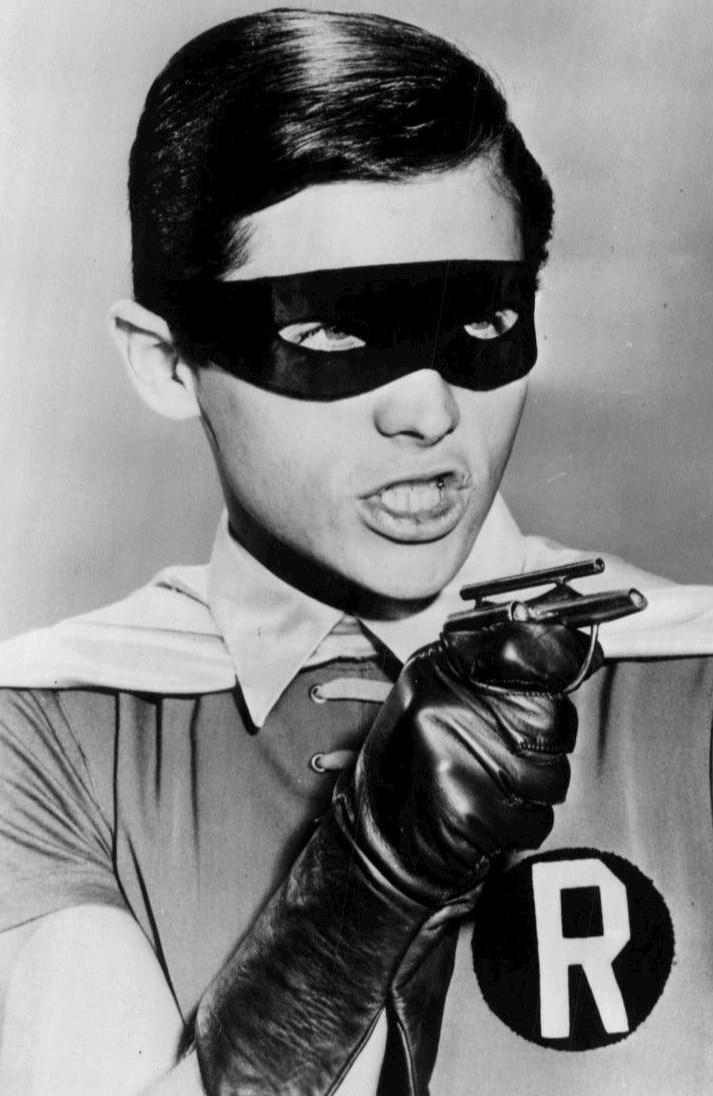
Ward as Robin

Unlike the series' lead, Adam West, Ward was required to perform some dangerous stunt work. He was told this was because his costume revealed more of his face, making it impractical for all of his stunt scenes to be performed by a stunt double. Later, he also discovered that he was being paid the minimum wage allowed by the Screen Actors Guild, and his stunt double was paid per stunt, so having Ward perform his own stunts was a cost-saving strategy. Ward says that he needed medical treatment dozens of times during his time as Robin.

At the height of the series' popularity, Ward recorded several musical tracks during sessions produced by Tom Wilson and arranged by Frank Zappa. The first two, "Boy Wonder, I Love You" (which Zappa wrote) and "Orange Colored Sky", were released as a single on November 14, 1966. Two other tracks from these sessions, "Teenage Bill of Rights" and "Autumn Love", remain unreleased.

In 1969, a year after Batman's cancellation, West's mother died, bringing the two men closer together. They were reunited many times at conventions and TV reunion specials. In turn, Ward also made three guest appearances with West on separate cartoons: one was a 2002 episode of The Simpsons, later in 2010 on an episode of SpongeBob SquarePants, and in 2013 for one of the final episodes of Futurama. West and Ward remained friends until West's death on June 9, 2017, at age 88.

In 1985, DC Comics named Ward as one of the honorees in the company's 50th-anniversary publication Fifty Who Made DC Great for his work on the Batman series. He made a cameo in the 2019 Arrowverse television special "Crisis on Infinite Earths". On January 9, 2020, Ward received a star on the Hollywood Walk of Fame. Ward also makes frequent appearances at comic book conventions.

== Charity work ==
In 1994, Ward and his wife, Tracy Posner Ward, founded a charitable organization called Gentle Giants Rescue and Adoptions, Inc., which rescues giant-breed dogs, such as Great Danesand some smaller-breed dogs. All of the dogs are socialized, behaviorally trained, and live communally together in the couple's home. In a 2018 interview Ward stated the couple has a special permit from the city and have a minimum of 50 dogs in their home at all times. Their work with the organization has been featured in such outlets as People magazine, ASPCA Animal Watch, Hard Copy, Inside Edition, and Entertainment Tonight. Ward was also seen in an episode of Animal Planet's Adoption Tales. In 2024 Ward received the President's Lifetime Achievement Award and the United Nations Association of the United States of America Humanitarian Award, for rescuing over 15,500 dogs.

Ward has also created a company, Gentle Giants, which sells dog and cat food, Ward has claimed the food has doubled the average lifespan of their rescued giant breed dogs, with two of them living to 24 and 27 respectively. All the profits from the food go back to his dog rescue organization.

== Personal life ==
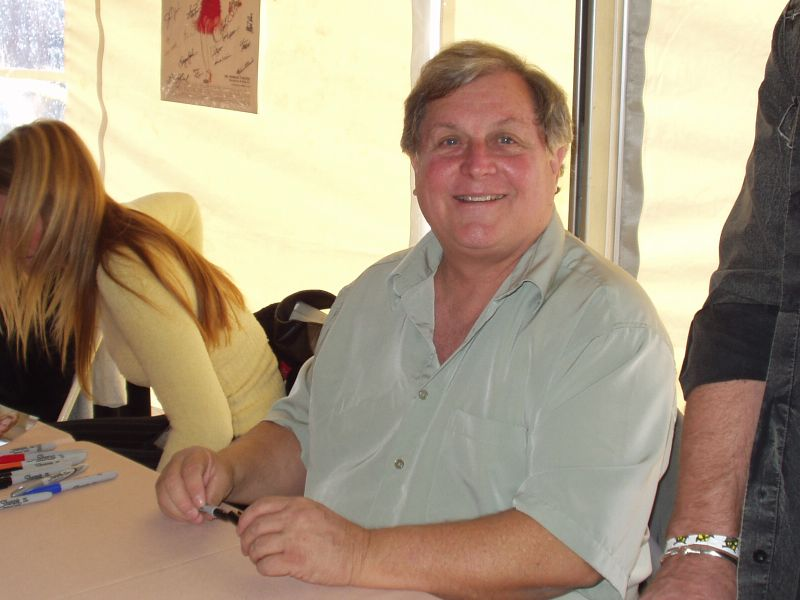
Ward at an autograph signing in 2005

Ward's first wife was Bonney Lindsey, daughter of conductor Mort Lindsey. Ward and Lindsey married on July 19, 1965, and divorced in 1967. They had one daughter in 1966. From 1967 to 1969, he was married to actress Kathy Kersh, whom he met when she appeared as a guest villainess on the Batman television series. He was married to model Mariana Torchia from 1985 to 1989. Since 1990, Ward has been married to Tracy Posner. Their daughter was born on February 16, 1991.

From an early age Ward practiced in martial arts. He trained under All Korean champion Young Ik Suh and later earned his black belt in karate. This training later benefited him on the set of Batman, where he performed many of his own stunts due to his combat skills. Ward was also a friend of Bruce Lee and the two would spar each other regularly. Ward was later inducted into International Karate and Kickboxing Hall of Fame in 2015.

== Filmography ==
=== Film ===
Year	Title	Role	Notes
1966	Batman	Dick Grayson / Robin	
1970	Scream, Evelyn, Scream!	Dune Buggy Driver	
1985	Fire in the Night	Paul	
1987	The Underachievers	Bowmont	
1989	Kill Crazy	Michael	Video
1989	Robot Ninja	Stanley Kane	
1989	Batman and Robin and the Other Super Heroes	Himself (Presenter)	Video documentary
1989	Holy Batmania	Himself / Robin	Video documentary short
1990	Cyber-C.H.I.C.	Harry Truman Hodgkins	
1990	The Girl I Want	Mr. Masters	
1990	Smoothtalker	Lab Technician	
1991	Virgin High	Dick Murphy	
1992	Hot Under the Collar	The Pope	
1993	Beach Babes from Beyond	Mr. Bun	
1993	The Dwelling	Crasmire	Video
1994	Reverse Heaven	Doctor	
1995	Karate Raider	Dr. Gan	
1995	Assault of the Party Nerds 2: The Heavy Petting Detective	Randolph	
1996	Alien Force	Omnipresent Praxima	Video
1998	Desperation Boulevard	Himself	
1999	Moving Targets	O'Malley	
2001	Batman Featurette	Himself	Video documentary short
2002	Pacino Is Missing	Guard	
2003	Return to the Batcave: The Misadventures of Adam and Burt	Himself	TV movie
2013	Starring Adam West	Himself	Documentary
2014	Na Na Batman	Himself	Featurette
2014	Batmania Born	Himself	Featurette
2015	Star Quest	Wayne	
2016	Batman: Return of the Caped Crusaders	Dick Grayson / Robin (voice)	
2017	Batman vs. Two-Face	Dick Grayson / Robin (voice)	
2018	Heaven & Hell	Doctor	
2019	Once Upon a Time in Hollywood	Dick Grayson / Robin (voice)	Archival audio recording (uncredited)
TBA	Star Quest	Wayne	Post-production

=== Television ===
Date	Title	Role	Notes
1966–1968	Batman	Dick Grayson / Robin	Main role
1967	Batgirl	Dick Grayson / Robin	Studio short
1967	The Hollywood Squares	Himself	5 episodes
1977	The New Adventures of Batman	Dick Grayson / Robin (voice)	16 episodes
1979	Legends of the Superheroes	Dick Grayson / Robin	Specials: "The Challenge", "The Roast"
1983	Family Feud	Himself	Episodes: "Batman vs. Lost in Space" & "Gilligan's Island vs. Batman"
1984	High School U.S.A.	Teacher	TV special
1990	The Girl I Want	Dad	USA Movie
1995	Living Single	Himself	Episode: "Mommy Not Dearest"
1997	Homeboys in Outer Space	Gerbil	Episode: "The Adventures of Ratman and Gerbil or, Holy Homeboys in Outer Space"
2000–2004	Biography	Himself	Episodes: "Adam West: Behind the Cowl", "Batman: Holy Batmania!" & "Catwoman: Her Many Lives"
2002	The Simpsons	Dick Grayson / Robin (voice)	Episode: "Large Marge"
2002	Hollywood Squares	Himself	5 episodes
2006	TV Land's Top Ten	Himself	TV series documentary – "Top 10 TV Dynamic Duos"
2006	The 4th Annual TV Land Awards	Himself	TV special
2008	Guiding Light	Himself	1 episode
2010	SpongeBob SquarePants	Young Barnacle Boy (voice)	Episode: "Back to the Past/The Bad Guy Club for Villains"
2011	Hollywood Treasure	Himself	Episode: "Holy Gobstopper, Batman!"
2013	Futurama	Himself	Episode: "Leela and the Genestalk"
2015	Robot Chicken	Himself	Episode: "Robot Chicken DC Comics Special III: Magical Friendship"
2019	Supergirl	Dick Grayson (Earth-66)	Episode: "Crisis on Infinite Earths: Part One"

== Awards and nominations ==
Year	Award	Category	Work	Result
1967	Photoplay	Most Promising New Star (Male)	Himself	Nominated
1967	Photoplay	Gold Medal-Favorite TV Program	Batman (shared with Adam West)	Nominated
2004	TV Land Awards	Favorite Crimestopper Duo	Batman (shared with Adam West)	Won
2005	TV Land Awards	Favorite Crimestopper	Batman (shared with Adam West)	Won
2014	Inkpot Award	Inkpot	Himself	Won
2020	Hollywood Walk of Fame	Star	Himself	Won

== Bibliography ==
- Boy Wonder: My Life in Tights. With Stanley Ralph Ross. ISBN 978-0964704800 (1995)
