= Cafe Express =

Restaurant chain in Texas, United States

Coordinates: 29.7613°N 95.4797°W

- Type: Private
- Industry: Restaurant
- Genre: Fast casual
- Founded: 1984
- Founders: Lonnie Schiller and Robert Del Grande
- Headquarters: Houston, Texas, United States
- Number of locations: 4 (2023)
- Area served: Texas
- Products: Salads, sandwiches, burgers, pasta dishes
- Website: www.cafe-express.com

Cafe Express is a Houston-based fast-casual restaurant chain whose menu is influenced by European cafe and bistro cuisine.

The chain was founded in 1984 by Schiller Del Grande Restaurant Group. In 2004 fast food giant Wendy's International acquired a 70% stake in Cafe Express. In 2007, Wendy's sold the company back to Schiller Del Grande and its original investor, Redstone.
