= Envy ratio =

Term used in finance

Envy ratio, in finance, refers to the ratio of the price paid by investors to the price paid by the management team for their respective shares of equity.

== Overview ==
The Envy ratio is used to evaluate opportunities for a management buyout. Managers are often allowed to invest at a lower valuation, which facilitates their ownership and provides a personal financial incentive to approve the buyout and work diligently towards its success. The envy ratio is somewhat similar to the concept of financial leverage; managers can increase returns on their investments by using other investors' money.

== Basic formula ==
$$\mbox{Envy ratio} = {\mbox{Investment by investors / Percent of equity} \over \mbox{Investment by managers / Percent of equity}}$$

== Example ==
If private equity investors paid $500M for 80% of a company's equity, and a management team paid $60M for 20%, then ER=(500/0,8)/(60/0,2)=2.08x. This means that the investors paid for a share 2.08 times more than did the managers. The ratio demonstrates how generous institutional investors are to a management team—the higher the ratio is, the better is the deal for management.

As a rule of thumb, management should be expected to invest anywhere from six months to one year's gross salary to demonstrate commitment and have some personal financial risk. In any transaction, the envy ratio is affected by how keen the investors are to do the deal; the competition they are facing; and economic factors.

== See also ==
- Management buy-in
- LBO
- Takeover
- Financial ratio
