= First Kitchen =

Japanese fast food restaurant chain

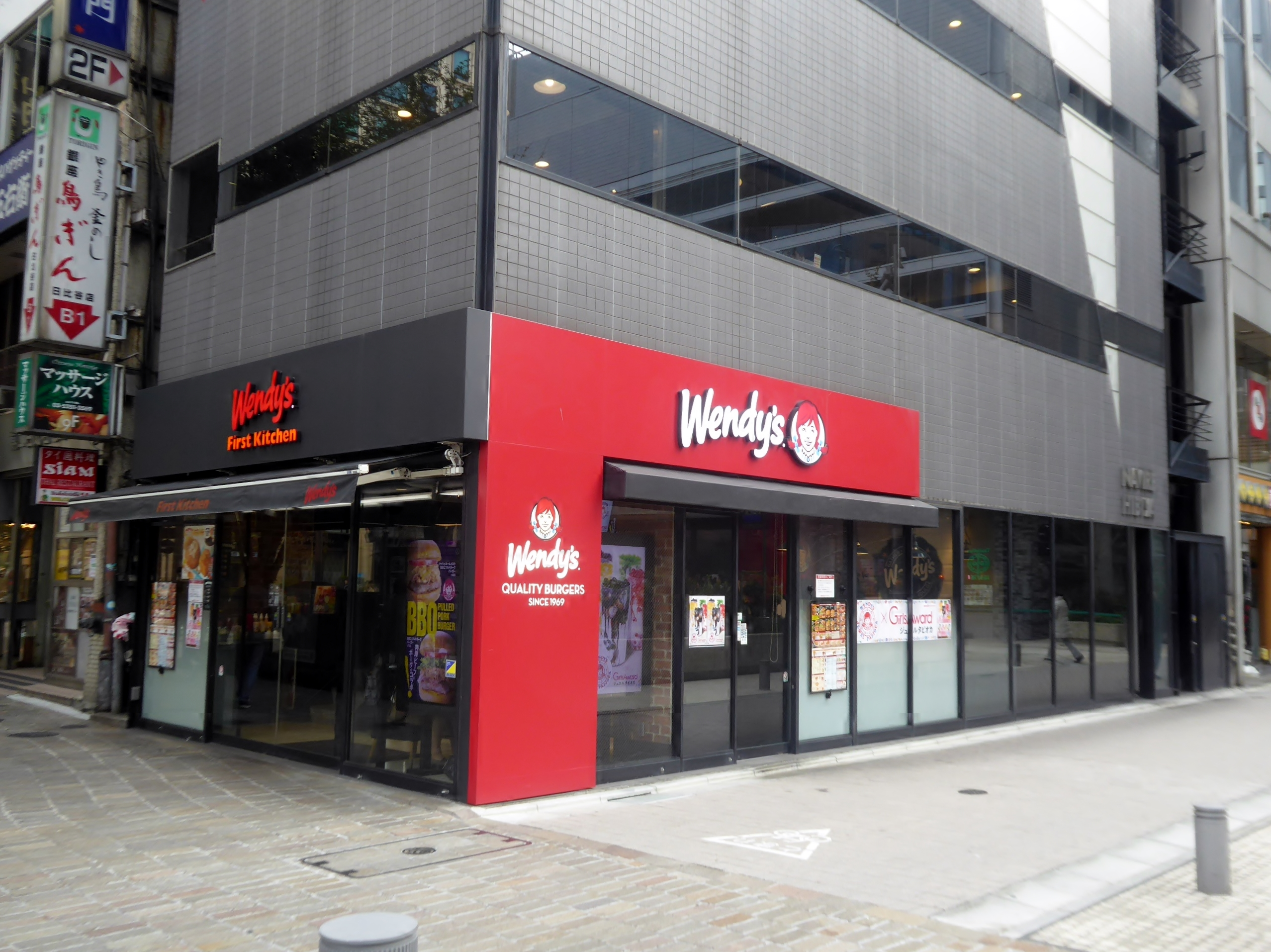
Wendy's First Kitchen Hibiya Chanter-mae store in Tokyo

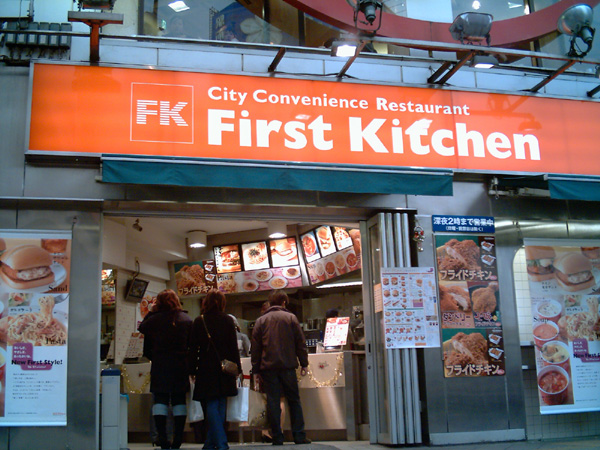
A pre-Wendy's First Kitchen in Tokyo in 2006

First Kitchen (ファーストキッチン, Fāsuto Kitchin) is a Japanese fast food restaurant chain operated by First Kitchen Co., Ltd., a wholly owned subsidiary of Wendy's International. Prior to June 2016, it was a subsidiary of Suntory Holdings.

Its first shop opened in Ikebukuro, Tokyo, in September 1977. Currently, its stores operate in 14 prefectures, in the Kantō, Chūbu, and Kinki regions. Of the 136 stores, about 100 exist in Kantō as of June 1, 2016. The chain was acquired by Wendy's Japan from Suntory Holdings on June 1, 2016, and now operates under the name Wendy's First Kitchen as a result of its acquisition.

Its current president and chief executive officer is Hiroshi Kato.

== Menu ==
The staple menu since its founding has been Bacon Egg Burger. While originally a hamburger restaurant, the company began to expand its menu in 1996 in a move to differentiate itself from its competitors. Currently, the restaurant also serves pizza, pasta, and fried chicken. This restaurant is noteworthy for its flavored French fries, called "Flavor Potato".

== Abbreviation issue ==
Colloquially, the restaurant is frequently abbreviated as Fakkin (ファッキン). However, the company neither uses this abbreviation nor approves of its use because of its similarity to the pronunciation of "fucking", a vulgarity in English; instead choosing to emphasize the abbreviation FK (エフケイ, Efukei). In 2005, a redesigned logo that emphasized the letters "FK" was introduced.
