= Virgin High =

- Directed by: Richard Gabai
- Written by: Jeff Neill; Richard Gabai
- Produced by: Richard Gabai
- Cinematography: Howard Wexler
- Edited by: John Shepphird
- Music by: Larry Berliner
- Production company: Check Entertainment
- Distributed by: RCA/Columbia Pictures Home Entertainment
- Release date: January 1991
- Running time: 89 minutes
- Country: United States
- Language: English

Virgin High is a 1991 direct-to-video sex comedy film directed and produced by Richard Gabai. Gabai co-wrote the film with Jeff Neill and stars Traci Dali, Burt Ward, and Linnea Quigley. Gabai plays the boyfriend of a teenage girl sent to Catholic school, which he attempts to bluff his way into so they can have sex. It was also the first film appearance of Leslie Mann.

== Plot ==
When Christy Murphy's strict parents become suspicious that she's fooling around with boys, they send her to an all-girls Catholic school. Her boyfriend, Jerry, bluffs his way into the school disguised as a priest. Determined to have sex with Christy, Jerry attempts to avoid the nuns while maintaining his cover.

== Cast ==
- Burt Ward as Dick Murphy
- Linnea Quigley as Kathleen
- Traci Dali as Christy Murphy
- Richard Gabai as Jerry
- Kent Burden as Theo
- Michelle Bauer as Miss Bush

== Release ==
RCA/Columbia Pictures Home Entertainment released the film direct-to-video in January 1991.

== Reception ==
Variety's review said that it is "uneven but boasts better writing than most teen sex comedies". The review in TV Guide called it harmless but "nearly pointless and rather dull". Drive-in film critic Joe Bob Briggs sarcastically recommended Virgin High as a family film, rating it two stars.
