= Hammermill Paper Company =

American paper manufacturer

Hammermill Paper Company is an American paper manufacturer originally founded in 1898 as the Ernst R. Behrend Company. The company was purchased in 1986 by International Paper Company, where the namesake survived as a brand of paper. This brand was later spun off into Sylvamo Corporation when International Paper spun Sylvamo off.

== History ==
Hammermill Paper Company was founded in 1898 by the brothers Ernst, Otto, and Bernard Behrend and their father Moritz Behrend in Erie, Pennsylvania. Ernst served as President and Otto, secretary. Construction of their first paper mill, in Erie, began that same year.

Behrend changed the name of the company before the first mill even opened in honor of his father's papermills in Germany. The company expanded by buying a mill in Oswego, New York, that was making copier paper exclusively for Xerox. In the 1960s, mills were acquired in Lock Haven, Pennsylvania and near Selma, Alabama. In 1962, they bought the Strathmore Paper Company.

In 1986, after a failed takeover by Paul Bilzerian and brothers William and Earle I. Mack (sons of New Jersey real estate developer H. Bert Mack), Hammermill was purchased by International Paper Company. Customer services and operations moved to their Memphis headquarters in 1988.

=== Shooting ===
On October 23, 1967, an employee of Hammermill's Lock Haven location opened fire at the mill. The employee, 40-year-old Leo Held, killed five and injured four of his co-workers before leaving the plant and opening fire at two more locations within Clinton County. Held was later mortally wounded by police.

== Innovations ==
- 1952: Hammermill developed the neutracel pulping process.
- 1954: In a cooperative venture with the Haloid-Xerox Company, they created the first xerographic copier papers.
- 1986: Hammermill became the first manufacturer to market paper optimized for laser printers.
