= Trian Partners =

Activist investor hedge fund based in New York

Trian Fund Management, L.P.
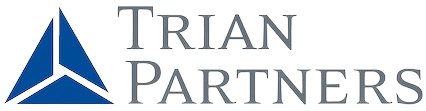
- Trade name: Trian Partners
- Type: Private
- Industry: Investment management
- Founded: 2005; 21 years ago
- Founders: Nelson Peltz; Peter W. May; Ed Garden
- Headquarters: New York City, United States
- Key people: Nelson Peltz (CEO); Peter W. May (President)
- AUM: US$7.15 billion (2023)
- Number of employees: 50 (2023)
- Website: trianpartners.com

Trian Fund Management, L.P., which uses the trade name Trian Partners, is an American hedge fund management firm headquartered in New York City. As an activist investor, the firm has pushed for significant change at some of America's largest corporations.

== History ==
Trian was founded in 2005 by Nelson Peltz, Peter W. May, and Ed Garden.

In June 2023, Garden, who was the firm's chief investment officer, stepped down from the role, although he remained a senior advisor at Trian. It came as a surprise to some as he was the youngest of the three co-founders and was expected to remain in the position, potentially leading the business.

Trian focuses on the consumer, industrial, and financial sectors. The firm has developed a reputation as an activist investor and has often obtained board of directors seats at companies to make changes to them.

== Notable deals ==
In 2007, Trian bought a 3% share of Cadbury-Schweppes. Cadbury Schweppes Americas Beverages was later spun off from the Cadbury Schweppes confectionery group. In the same year, Trian also bought $1.8 billion in shares of Kraft Foods.

In February 2011, Trian offered to buy Family Dollar for $55–60 per share which was rejected. Family Dollar also used the poison pill tactic in its defense. In September 2011, Garden joined the Family Dollar board.

In October 2011, Trian, which owned 3.3% of State Street Corporation, called for it to focus more on profitability and to consider selling or spinning-off its investment management arm, State Street Global Advisors. Although State Street kept its investment management arm, it engaged in other cost-cutting measures. By the time Trian sold its stake in State Street in 2013, the share price of had doubled.

In May 2012, Trian announced that in partnership with CalSTRS, it had a 7% stake in Ingersoll Rand. In August, Peltz joined its board. Trian and Peltz spearheaded a move to break up the company to improve profitability. Ingersoll Rand eventually agreed to spin off its securities business as Allegion, which was completed in December 2013.

In February 2014, as a beneficial owner of approximately $1.2 billion of PepsiCo shares, Trian publicly released a letter to PepsiCo's board of directors and a white paper detailing why it should spin out its beverage business from its snacks division. Previously it had urged PepsiCo to acquire Mondelez International, but dropped the idea after winning a seat on Mondelēz's board. Though PepsiCo rejected the breakup proposal, it settled with Trian in January 2015 and added a director which Trian had recommended to its board. It then engaged in cost-cutting measures which improved its profit margins. In May 2016, Trian sold its entire stake of PepsiCo which at the time was worth over $2 billion and was a 50% return on investment from its initial purchase in 2012.

In October 2015, Trian bought a $2.5 billion stake in General Electric. In May 2019, Peltz and Garden joined Legg Mason's board of directors. At the time, Trian had a 4.5% stake in the company. When Franklin Templeton Investments acquired Legg Mason in July 2020, Trian made a $70 million profit.

In October 2020, Trian acquired 9.9% stakes in both Invesco and Janus Henderson. Peltz and Garden then joined Invesco's board of directors. On February 1, 2022, Peltz and Garden left the board after Trian noted Invesco's financial performance had significantly improved. At the same time, Trian increased its stake in Janus Henderson to 16.7%, becoming its biggest shareholder with Peltz and Garden joining its board. Performance for Janus Henderson lagged and Trian wanted to exercise more control.

In May 2022, Trian announced it was considering a significant transaction with Wendy's. This included selling it, acquiring it entirely or merging it with another company. As it invested in the predecessor company of Wendy's, it held 19.4% of shares in the company at the time, making it the largest shareholder. However, in January 2023, Trian stated it would drop these plans as Wendy's announced a corporate redesign, doubled its dividend to increase its share price and also announced a $500 million share repurchase program.

In December 2025, Trian and a group of investors led by General Catalyst announced they will acquire asset manager Janus Henderson in an all-cash deal valuing it at $7.4 billion. The deal was completed in July 2026.

== Proxy fights ==
In 2006, Trian was involved in a proxy fight with Heinz to get five independent directors on the board of Heinz. Trian succeeded in getting two members on the board, including Peltz. In May 2015, Trian was unsuccessful in a proxy fight to appoint four of its nominees to the board of DuPont. Five months later the CEO of DuPont, Ellen Kullman, resigned and DuPont acknowledged lower than expected earnings and the need to accelerate a cost-cutting plan.

In October 2017, Peltz tried but failed to acquire a seat on the board of Procter & Gamble, in which Trian had a 1.5% stake. On November 15, it was discovered that per a revision of all votes, which Peltz acknowledged to have resulted in a remarkably close battle, Peltz had in fact won the proxy battle, recognized as the largest in corporate history. On December 15, Procter & Gamble named Peltz to its board, although it said that Peltz had nominally lost the proxy vote. In August 2021, Peltz stepped down from the board.

In January 2023, Peltz and Trian officially launched a proxy fight with Disney and was looking to get a board seat at the company. Peltz did not support the reappointment of Bob Iger as CEO and the departure of Bob Chapek in December 2022. In an online presentation titled "Restore the Magic", Peltz and Trian said that Disney had poor strategic planning, excessive compensation practices, and unsatisfactory cost management. It was pointed out that the acquisition of 21st Century Fox by Disney put it in a weak financial position. On February 9, the proxy fight was ended after Disney unveiled a vast restructuring plan, cost cuts and 7,000 layoffs.

According to reports, by October 2023, Trian had increased its stake in Disney to approximately 30 million shares worth over $2.5 billion in a new push, this time for multiple board seats. On December 1, Peltz and Trian launched a second proxy fight against Disney with the aim of getting at least three board seats at the company. Sources claim Peltz's main issues were with Disney's share price and margins as well as the board's decision to extend Iger's tenure by two years to the end of 2026. Peltz was not elected in his second attempt.
