= Peter W. May =

American businessman (born 1943/4)

- Born: 1943 or 1944 (age 82–83)
- Education: University of Chicago (BA, MBA)
- Occupation: Businessman
- Known for: Co-founder of Trian Partners
- Spouse: Leni Ann Finkelstein
- Children: 2

Peter William May (born 1943/44) is an American businessman and investor.

== Biography ==
May was born to a Jewish family and grew up in Hewlett, New York, on Long Island, the son of Isabel and Samuel May. His father was a businessman, and his mother was a social worker. He has one sister, Linda. He graduated with a B.A. and later a M.B.A. from the University of Chicago and then worked for the accounting firm Peat Marwick. In 1972, he joined the Flagstaff Corp, founded by Nelson Peltz, as an accountant and later became its chief financial officer.

In the 1980s, May and Peltz partnered and founded the investment firm Triarc Companies, where May was the president and chief operating officer. In April 1983, Peltz and May bought a stake in vending-machine and wire company Triangle Industries Inc. with the idea of using it to make acquisitions, building it into a Fortune 100 industrial company. Triangle was sold to Pechiney in 1988. In 1989, May joined the board of directors at Mount Sinai Medical Center; in 2002, he was named chairman after being asked by former U.S. Secretary of the Treasury and then fellow board member Robert Rubin. He restored Mount Sinai to profitability in three years without utilizing its $180 million in unrestricted funds while increasing its endowment by $70 million to $500 million.

== Personal life ==
In 1964, May married Leni Ann Finkelstein. They have a son and a daughter. Peter May and Leni Finkelstein live in Bridgewater, Connecticut.

May is the co-chairman of the Board of the New York Philharmonic.
