= Southeastern Public Service Authority =

Solid waste management agency

The Southeastern Public Service Authority (SPSA) is the solid waste management agency for the one-million-population region south of Hampton Roads Harbor and the lower James River in Virginia. Based in Chesapeake, Virginia, it services the independent cities of Chesapeake, Franklin, Norfolk, Portsmouth, Suffolk, and Virginia Beach and the counties of Isle of Wight and Southampton.

SPSA was created by an act of the Virginia General Assembly in 1976. Before, each community in South Hampton Roads fully managed its own solid waste. As federal environmental regulations became stricter in the 1970s, it became apparent that the region needed a regional system to manage the area's garbage. In 2025, SPSA entered into a long-term agreement with AMP to divert half of the region's municipal solid waste from landfill disposal.

SPSA facilities are located throughout its 2,000-square-mile (5,200 km^{2}) service area. These facilities include the Regional Landfill, ten transfer stations, a household hazardous waste facility, and a tire processing facility.

Residents in the SPSA region each throw away about six pounds of trash per day, resulting in about 2,200 pounds of trash a year per person, i.e. over a million tons of waste each year. At least half of this waste is diverted from landfill disposal, through AI sortation, and sold as recyclable commodities or converted into biochar.

SPSA is ISO 14001 certified.

SPSA has approximately 150 employees.
