= Nelson Peltz =

American businessman (born 1942)

- Born: June 24, 1942 (age 84); New York City, U.S.
- Known for: Founder of Trian Partners
- Political party: Republican
- Spouses: Cynthia Abrams (m. 1964; div. 1981); Claudia Heffner (m. 1985)
- Children: 10, including Will and Nicola

Nelson Peltz (born June 24, 1942) is an American billionaire businessman and investor. He is a founding partner, together with Peter W. May and Edward P. Garden, of Trian Partners, an alternative investment management fund based in New York. He is a former director of Heinz, Mondelēz International, and Ingersoll Rand and a former CEO of Triangle Industries.

== Early life ==
Peltz was born to a Jewish family in 1942 in Brooklyn, New York, the son of Claire (née Wechsler; 1905–2007) and Maurice Herbert Peltz (1901–1977). He was the youngest of their three children, and grew up in the Cypress Hills section of Brooklyn, a sub-section of the East New York neighborhood.

He attended Horace Mann School in the Bronx. Peltz attended the undergraduate program at the Wharton School of the University of Pennsylvania starting in 1960, where he joined the fraternity of Phi Gamma Delta, but left school in 1963, without receiving a degree.

== Career ==
Peltz dropped out of the Wharton School with the intention of becoming a ski instructor in Oregon. However, he ended up driving a delivery truck for A. Peltz & Sons, a wholesale food distribution business founded by his grandfather in 1896, which delivered fresh produce and Snow Crop brand frozen food to restaurants in New York.

Peltz's father gave him free rein with the company, and over the next 15 years he and his older brother, Robert B. Peltz, grew the business, gradually shifting the product line from produce to institutional frozen foods. Over the next 10 years, Peltz bought up several food companies, and in 1973, he and his brother together with Peltz's business partner, Peter May, who joined Peltz in 1972, took their company, then called Flagstaff Corp., with $150 million in sales, public. In 1979, Peltz sold Flagstaff's foodservice business division to a group of investors. Two years later, the food service business went bankrupt and the lender asked Peltz to salvage their outstanding loan. Within a year, the loans were repaid as Peltz rebuilt the business.

In the 1980s, Peltz and May, who had joined Flagstaff as Chief Financial Officer (CFO) after having been its accountant, went looking for new acquisitions. In April 1983, the two bought a stake in vending-machine and wire company Triangle Industries Inc. with the idea of using it to make acquisitions, building it into a Fortune 100 industrial company and the largest packaging company in the world. Triangle was sold to Pechiney in 1988.

In 1997, through an investment vehicle they controlled, Triarc Companies, Inc., Peltz and May acquired Snapple from Quaker Oats. Snapple, together with other beverage brands, was sold to Cadbury Schweppes in 2000. The Snapple turnaround was featured as a Harvard Business School case study. Since May 2022, Peltz has been a non-executive director at Unilever. In January 2024, Peltz unsuccessfully self-nominated for a position on the board of Disney.

=== Trian Partners ===
In 2005, Peltz, May, and Ed Garden founded Trian Fund Management, L.P. As an activist investing firm, Trian has invested in such companies as Heinz, Cadbury, Kraft Foods, Ingersoll Rand, Wendy's, DuPont, Mondelēz, PepsiCo, State Street Corporation, Procter & Gamble and Family Dollar. Peltz and Trian have a 16% stake in Wendy's and in February 2026 announced it was in discussions to take it private.

== Personal life ==
In 1964, he married Cynthia Abrams, daughter of Emerson Radio & Phonograph Corporation co-founder Benjamin Abrams; they divorced in 1981. They had two children.

In 1985, he married his second wife, Claudia Heffner, a former fashion model, with whom he has eight children.

Among Peltz's children are actors Nicola Peltz (born 1995) and Will Peltz (born 1986). His son Brad Peltz (born 1989) was drafted by the Ottawa Senators hockey team, which Nelson Peltz himself was once rumored to have an interest in buying. His daughter Nicola married Brooklyn Beckham, in a Jewish ceremony on April 9, 2022. His son Will married American fashion model Kenya Kinski-Jones, daughter of American record producer Quincy Jones and German actress Nastassja Kinski, on June 13, 2026.

Peltz resides at his home, Montsorrel, in Palm Beach, Florida. The property was previously owned by Robert R. Young and his wife Anita. In 2015, he began a refurbishment and expansion project for the property. He also resides in Bedford, New York.

=== Politics ===
Peltz has been described as a "notable Republican donor", though he has described his own sympathies as centrist, saying "this country operates way better between center-right and center-left". He is a longtime friend and supporter of Democratic U.S. Senator Joe Manchin, whom he has credited with "keeping our elected officials somewhere in the middle".

In 2020, Peltz organized a fundraiser in support of the re-election campaign of President Donald Trump, but following the storming of the United States Capitol on January 6, 2021, Peltz said on CNBC on January 7, "I voted for [Trump] in this past election in November. Today I'm sorry I did that." During the 2024 Republican Party presidential primaries, Peltz was an early supporter of the campaign of Ron DeSantis, though he was later reported to express misgivings over DeSantis' support for banning abortion after the sixth week of pregnancy. After Trump became the presumptive Republican nominee, Peltz said he would reluctantly vote for him, telling the Financial Times that he disagreed with President Joe Biden's immigration policies and expressing skepticism over Biden's age and health.

== Wealth and donations ==
In February 2014, Forbes listed Peltz as one of the 25 highest-earning hedge fund managers in 2013, with total earnings of $430 million, ranked 16th.

According to Forbes Magazine, Peltz had a net worth of $1.51 billion as of February 2017. This made him the 432nd-richest person in the US. As of October 2021, his net worth was estimated at US$1.7 billion.

In 2005, Peltz was among 53 entities that contributed the maximum of $250,000 to the second inauguration of President George W. Bush. Peltz has sat on the Board of Trustees of New York-Presbyterian Hospital since 2019.

=== Awards and recognition ===
Peltz was said by the National Association of Corporate Directors (NACD) in 2010, 2011, and 2012 to be among the most influential people in global corporate governance.
