= Private equity in the 1990s =

Private equity in the 1990s relates to one of the major periods in the history of private equity and venture capital. Within the broader private equity industry, two distinct sub-industries, leveraged buyouts and venture capital, experienced growth along parallel although interrelated tracks.

The development of the private equity and venture capital asset classes has occurred through a series of boom and bust cycles since the middle of the 20th century. Private equity emerged in the 1990s out of the remnants of the savings and loan crisis, insider trading scandals, the real estate market collapse and the recession of the early 1990s which had culminated in the collapse of Drexel Burnham Lambert and had caused the shutdown of the high-yield debt market. This period saw the emergence of more institutionalized private equity firms, ultimately culminating in the Dot-com bubble of the late 1990s.

== LBO bust (1990 to 1992) ==
By the end of the 1980s the excesses of the leveraged buyout (LBO) market were beginning to show, with the bankruptcy of several large buyouts, including Robert Campeau's 1988 buyout of Federated Department Stores; the 1986 buyout of the Revco drug stores; Walter Industries; FEB Trucking and Eaton Leonard. At the time, the RJR Nabisco deal was showing signs of strain, leading to a recapitalization, in 1990, that included the contribution of $1.7 billion of new equity from KKR. In response to the threat of unwelcome LBOs, some companies adopted techniques such as the so-called poison pill to protect them against hostile takeovers by effectively self-destructing the company if it were to be taken over, a practices that is increasingly discredited.

=== The collapse of Drexel Burnham Lambert ===
Drexel Burnham Lambert was the investment bank most responsible for the boom in private equity during the 1980s, due to its leadership in the issuance of high-yield debt. On May 12, 1986, Dennis Levine, a Drexel managing director and investment banker, was charged with insider trading. Levine pleaded guilty to four felonies, and implicated one of his recent partners, arbitrageur Ivan Boesky. Largely based on information Boesky promised to provide about his dealings with Michael Milken, the Securities and Exchange Commission (SEC) initiated an investigation of Drexel on November 17. Two days later, Rudy Giuliani, the United States Attorney for the Southern District of New York, launched his own investigation.

For two years, Drexel consistently denied any wrongdoing, claiming that the criminal and SEC cases were based almost entirely on the statements of an admitted felon seeking to reduce his sentence. The SEC sued Drexel in September 1988 for insider trading, stock manipulation, defrauding its clients and stock parking (buying stocks for the benefit of another). All of the transactions involved Milken and his department. Giuliani considered indicting Drexel under the RICO Act, under the doctrine that companies are responsible for its employee's crimes.

A RICO indictment would have required the firm to put up a performance bond of as much as $1 billion, in lieu of having its assets frozen. Most of Drexel's capital was borrowed money, as is common with most investment banks, and it is difficult to receive credit for firms under a RICO indictment. Drexel CEO Fred Joseph said that he had been told that if Drexel were indicted under RICO, it would only survive a month at most.

Minutes prior to being indicted, Drexel reached an agreement with the government in which it pleaded nolo contendere (no contest) to six felonies – three counts of stock parking and three counts of stock manipulation. It also agreed to pay a fine of $650 million – at the time, the largest fine ever levied under securities laws. Milken had left the firm after his own indictment in March 1989. Effectively, Drexel was now a convicted felon.

In April 1989, Drexel settled with the SEC, agreeing to stricter safeguards on its oversight procedures. Later that month, the firm eliminated 5,000 jobs by shuttering three departments, including the retail brokerage operation.

Meanwhile, the high-yield debt markets had begun to shut down in 1989, a slowdown that accelerated into 1990. On February 13, 1990, after being advised by United States Secretary of the Treasury Nicholas F. Brady, the U.S. Securities and Exchange Commission (SEC), the New York Stock Exchange (NYSE) and the Federal Reserve System, Drexel Burnham Lambert officially filed for Chapter 11 bankruptcy protection.

=== S&L and the shutdown of the Junk Bond Market ===
In the 1980s, the boom in private equity transactions, specifically leveraged buyouts, was driven by the availability of financing, particularly high-yield debt, also known as "junk bonds". The collapse of the high yield market in 1989 and 1990 would signal the end of the LBO boom. At that time, many market observers were pronouncing the junk bond market “finished.” This collapse would be due largely to three factors:

- The collapse of Drexel Burnham Lambert, the foremost underwriter of junk bonds (discussed above).
- The dramatic increase in default rates among junk bond issuing companies. The historical default rate for high yield bonds from 1978 to 1988 was approximately 2.2% of total issuance. In 1989, defaults increased dramatically to 4.3% of the then $190 billion market and an additional 2.6% of issuance defaulted in the first half of 1990. As a result of the higher perceived risk, the differential in yield of the junk bond market over U.S. treasuries (known as the "spread") had also increased by 700 basis points (7 percentage points). This made the cost of debt in the high yield market significantly more expensive than it had been previously. The market shut down altogether for lower rated issuers.
- The mandated withdrawal of savings and loans from the high yield market. In August 1989, the U.S. Congress enacted the Financial Institutions Reform, Recovery and Enforcement Act of 1989 as a response to the savings and loan crisis of the 1980s. Under the law, savings and loans (S&Ls) could no longer invest in bonds that were rated below investment grade. Additionally, S&Ls were mandated to sell their holdings by the end of 1993 creating a huge supply of low priced assets that helped freeze the new issuance market.

Despite the adverse market conditions, several of the largest private equity firms were founded in this period including:

- Apollo Management founded in 1990 by Leon Black, a former Drexel Burnham Lambert banker and Michael Milken lieutenant;
- Madison Dearborn founded in 1992, by a team of professionals who previously made investments for First Chicago Bank.; and
- TPG Capital (formerly Texas Pacific Group) in 1992 by David Bonderman and James Coulter, who had worked previously with Robert M. Bass.

== The second private equity boom and the origins of modern private equity ==
Beginning roughly in 1992, three years after the RJR Nabisco buyout, and continuing through the end of the decade the private equity industry once again experienced a tremendous boom, both in venture capital (as will be discussed below) and leveraged buyouts with the emergence of brand name firms managing multibillion-dollar sized funds. After declining from 1990 through 1992, the private equity industry began to increase in size raising approximately $20.8 billion of investor commitments in 1992 and reaching a high-water mark in 2000 of $305.7 billion, outpacing the growth of almost every other asset class.

=== Resurgence of leveraged buyouts ===
Private equity in the 1980s was a controversial topic, commonly associated with corporate raids, hostile takeovers, asset stripping, layoffs, plant closings and outsized profits to investors. As private equity reemerged in the 1990s it began to earn a new degree of legitimacy and respectability. Although in the 1980s, many of the acquisitions made were unsolicited and unwelcome, private equity firms in the 1990s focused on making buyouts attractive propositions for management and shareholders. According to The Economist, “[B]ig companies that would once have turned up their noses at an approach from a private-equity firm are now pleased to do business with them.” Additionally, private equity investors became increasingly focused on the long-term development of companies they acquired, using less leverage in the acquisition. This was in part due to the lack of leverage available for buyouts during this period. In the 1980s leverage would routinely represent 85% to 95% of the purchase price of a company as compared to average debt levels between 20% and 40% in leveraged buyouts in the 1990s and the 2000s (decade). KKR's 1986 acquisition of Safeway, for example, was completed with 97% leverage and 3% equity contributed by KKR, whereas KKR's acquisition of TXU in 2007 was completed with approximately 19% equity contributed ($8.5 billion of equity out of a total purchase price of $45 billion). Additionally, private equity firms are more likely to make investments in capital expenditures and provide incentives for management to build long-term value.

The Thomas H. Lee Partners acquisition of Snapple Beverages, in 1992, is often described as the deal that marked the resurrection of the leveraged buyout after several dormant years. Only eight months after buying the company, Lee took Snapple Beverages public and in 1994, only two years after the original acquisition, Lee sold the company to Quaker Oats for $1.7 billion. Lee was estimated to have made $900 million for himself and his investors from the sale. Quaker Oats would subsequently sell the company, which performed poorly under new management, three years later for only $300 million to Nelson Peltz's Triarc. As a result of the Snapple deal, Thomas H. Lee, who had begun investing in private equity in 1974, would find new prominence in the private equity industry and catapult his Boston-based Thomas H. Lee Partners to the ranks of the largest private equity firms.

It was also in this timeframe that the capital markets would start to open up again for private equity transactions. During the 1990-1993 period, Chemical Bank established its position as a key lender to private equity firms under the auspices of pioneering investment banker, James B. Lee, Jr. (known as Jimmy Lee, not related to Thomas H. Lee). By the mid-20th century, under Jimmy Lee, Chemical had established itself as the largest lender in the financing of leveraged buyouts. Lee built a syndicated leveraged finance business and related advisory businesses including the first dedicated financial sponsor coverage group, which covered private equity firms in much the same way that investment banks had traditionally covered various industry sectors.

The following year, David Bonderman and James Coulter, who had worked for Robert M. Bass during the 1980s, together with William S. Price III, completed a buyout of Continental Airlines in 1993, through their nascent Texas Pacific Group, (today TPG Capital). TPG was virtually alone in its conviction that there was an investment opportunity with the airline. The plan included bringing in a new management team, improving aircraft utilization and focusing on lucrative routes. By 1998, TPG had generated an annual internal rate of return of 55% on its investment. Unlike Carl Icahn's hostile takeover of TWA in 1985., Bonderman and Texas Pacific Group were widely hailed as saviors of the airline, marking the change in tone from the 1980s. The buyout of Continental Airlines would be one of the few successes for the private equity industry which has suffered several major failures, including the 2008 bankruptcies of ATA Airlines, Aloha Airlines and Eos Airlines.

Among the most notable buyouts of the mid-to-late 1990s included:

- Duane Reade, 1990, 1997

The company's founders sold Duane Reade to Bain Capital for approximately $300 million. In 1997, Bain Capital then sold the chain to DLJ Merchant Banking Partners Duane Reade completed its initial public offering (IPO) on February 10, 1998

- Sealy Corporation, 1997

Bain Capital and a team of Sealy's senior executives acquired the mattress company through a management buyout

- KinderCare Learning Centers, 1997

Kohlberg Kravis Roberts and Hicks, Muse, Tate & Furst

- J. Crew, 1997

Texas Pacific Group acquired an 88% stake in the retailer for approximately $500 million, however the investment struggled due to the relatively high purchase price paid relative to the company's earnings. The company was able to complete a turnaround beginning in 2002 and complete an initial public offering in 2006

- Domino's Pizza, 1998

Bain Capital acquired a 49% interest in the second-largest pizza-chain in the US from its founder and would successfully take the company public on the New York Stock Exchange (NYSE:DPZ) in 2004.

- Regal Entertainment Group, 1998

Kohlberg Kravis Roberts and Hicks, Muse, Tate & Furst acquired the largest chain of movie theaters for $1.49 billion, including assumed debt. The buyers originally announced plans to acquire Regal, then merge it with United Artists (owned by Merrill Lynch at the time) and Act III (controlled by KKR), however the acquisition of United Artists fell through due to issues around the price of the deal and the projected performance of the company. Regal, along with the rest of the industry would encounter significant issues due to overbuilding of new multiplex theaters and would declare bankruptcy in 2001. Billionaire Philip Anschutz would take control of the company and later take the company public.

- Oxford Health Plans, 1998

An investor group led by Texas Pacific Group invested $350 million in a convertible preferred stock that can be converted into 22.1% of Oxford. The company completed a buyback of the TPG's PIPE convertible in 2000 and would ultimately be acquired by UnitedHealth Group in 2004.

- Petco, 2000

TPG Capital and Leonard Green & Partners invested $200 million to acquire the pet supplies retailer as part of a $600 million buyout. Within two years they sold most of it in a public offering that valued the company at $1 billion. Petco’s market value more than doubled by the end of 2004 and the firms would ultimately realize a gain of $1.2 billion. Then, in 2006, the private equity firms took Petco private again for $1.68 billion.

As the market for private equity matured, so too did its investor base. The Institutional Limited Partner Association was initially founded as an informal networking group for limited partner investors in private equity funds in the early 1990s. However the organization would evolve into an advocacy organization for private equity investors with more than 200 member organizations from 10 countries. As of the end of 2007, ILPA members had total assets under management in excess of $5 trillion with more than $850 billion of capital commitments to private equity investments.

=== The venture capital boom and the Internet Bubble (1995 to 2000) ===
In the 1980s, FedEx and Apple Inc. were able to grow because of private equity or venture funding, as were Cisco, Genentech, Microsoft and Avis. However, by the end of the 1980s, venture capital returns were relatively low, particularly in comparison with their emerging leveraged buyout cousins, due in part to the competition for hot startups, excess supply of IPOs and the inexperience of many venture capital fund managers. Unlike the leveraged buyout industry, after total capital raised increased to $3 billion in 1983, growth in the venture capital industry remained limited through the 1980s and the first half of the 1990s increasing to just over $4 billion more than a decade later in 1994.

After a shakeout of venture capital managers, the more successful firms retrenched, focusing increasingly on improving operations at their portfolio companies rather than continuously making new investments. Results would begin to turn very attractive, successful and would ultimately generate the venture capital boom of the 1990s. Former Wharton Professor Andrew Metrick refers to these first 15 years of the modern venture capital industry beginning in 1980 as the "pre-boom period" in anticipation of the boom that would begin in 1995 and last through the bursting of the Internet bubble in 2000.

The late 1990s were a boom time for the venture capital, as firms on Sand Hill Road in Menlo Park and Silicon Valley benefited from a huge surge of interest in the nascent Internet and other computer technologies. Initial public offerings of stock for technology and other growth companies were in abundance and venture firms were reaping large windfalls.

- Amazon.com
- America Online
- eBay
- Intuit
- Macromedia
- Netscape
- Sun Microsystems
- Yahoo! - On April 5, 1995, Sequoia Capital provided Yahoo with two rounds of venture capital. On 12 April 1996, Yahoo had its initial public offering, raising $33.8 million, by selling 2.6 million shares at $13 each.

=== The bursting of the Internet Bubble and the private equity crash (2000 to 2003) ===
The technology-heavy NASDAQ Composite index peaked at 5,048 in March 2000, reflecting the high point of the dot-com bubble.

The Nasdaq crash and technology slump that started in March 2000 shook virtually the entire venture capital industry as valuations for startup technology companies collapsed. Over the next two years, many venture firms had been forced to write-off their large proportions of their investments and many funds were significantly "under water" (the values of the fund's investments were below the amount of capital invested). Venture capital investors sought to reduce size of commitments they had made to venture capital funds and in numerous instances, investors sought to unload existing commitments for cents on the dollar in the secondary market. By mid-2003, the venture capital industry had shriveled to about half its 2001 capacity. Nevertheless, PricewaterhouseCoopers' MoneyTree Survey shows that total venture capital investments held steady at 2003 levels through the second quarter of 2005.

Although the post-boom years represent just a small fraction of the peak levels of venture investment reached in 2000, they still represent an increase over the levels of investment from 1980 through 1995. As a percentage of GDP, venture investment was 0.058% percent in 1994, peaked at 1.087% (nearly 19 times the 1994 level) in 2000 and ranged from 0.164% to 0.182% in 2003 and 2004. The revival of an Internet-driven environment (thanks to deals such as eBay's purchase of Skype, the News Corporation's purchase of MySpace.com, and the very successful Google.com and Salesforce.com IPOs) have helped to revive the venture capital environment. However, as a percentage of the overall private equity market, venture capital has still not reached its mid-1990s level, let alone its peak in 2000.

== See also ==
- History of private equity and venture capital
  - Early history of private equity
  - Private equity in the 1980s
  - Private equity in the 2000s
- Financial sponsor
- Private equity firm
- Private equity fund
- Private equity secondary market
- Mezzanine capital
- Private investment in public equity
- Taxation of Private Equity and Hedge Funds
- Mergers and acquisitions
