= Early history of private equity =

The early history of private equity relates to one of the major periods in the history of private equity and venture capital. Within the broader private equity industry, two distinct sub-industries, leveraged buyouts and venture capital experienced growth along parallel although interrelated tracks.

The origins of the modern private equity industry trace back to 1946 with the formation of the first venture capital firms. The thirty-five-year period from 1946 through the end of the 1970s was characterized by relatively small volumes of private equity investment, rudimentary firm organizations and limited awareness of and familiarity with the private equity industry.

== Pre-history ==
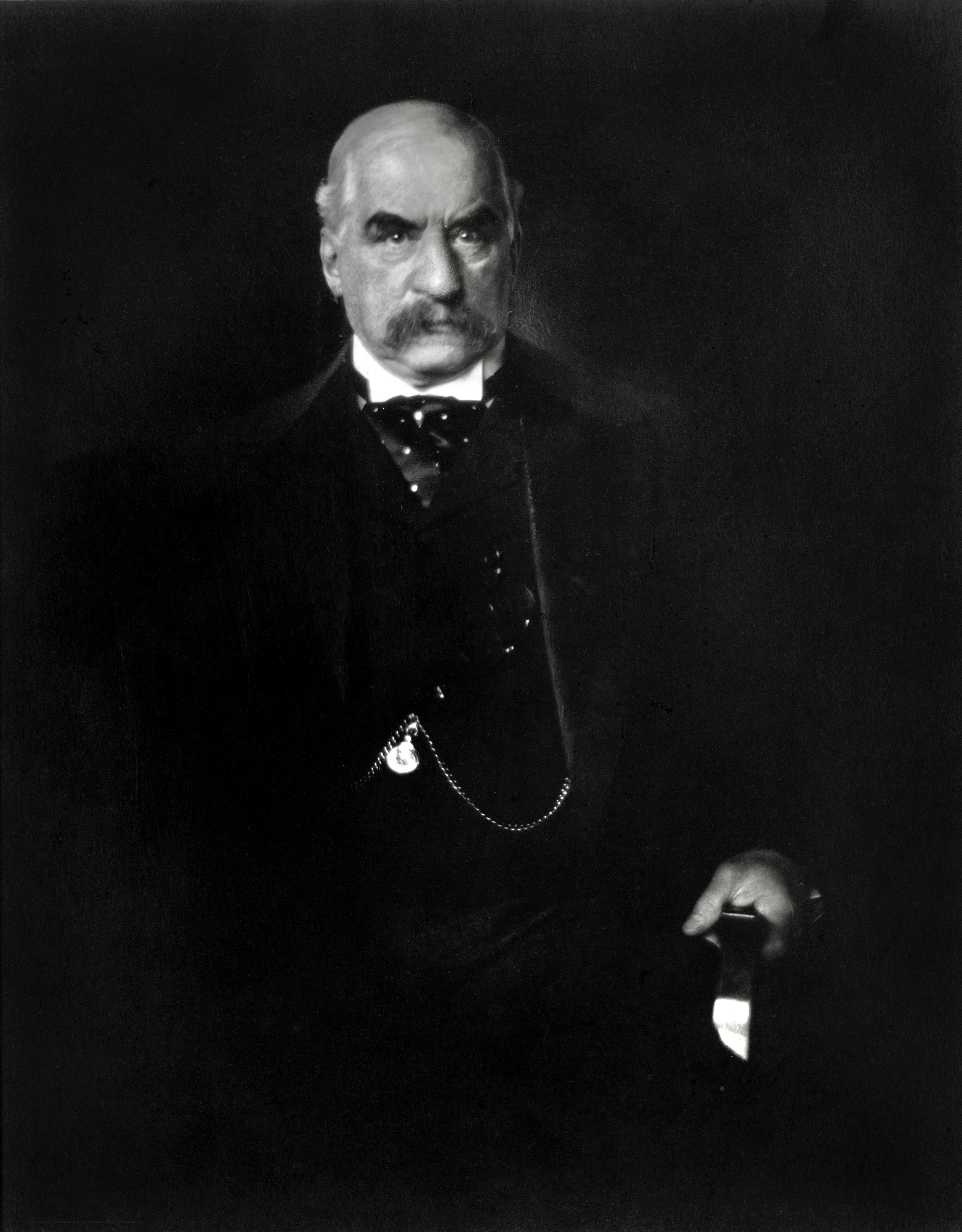
J.P. Morgan

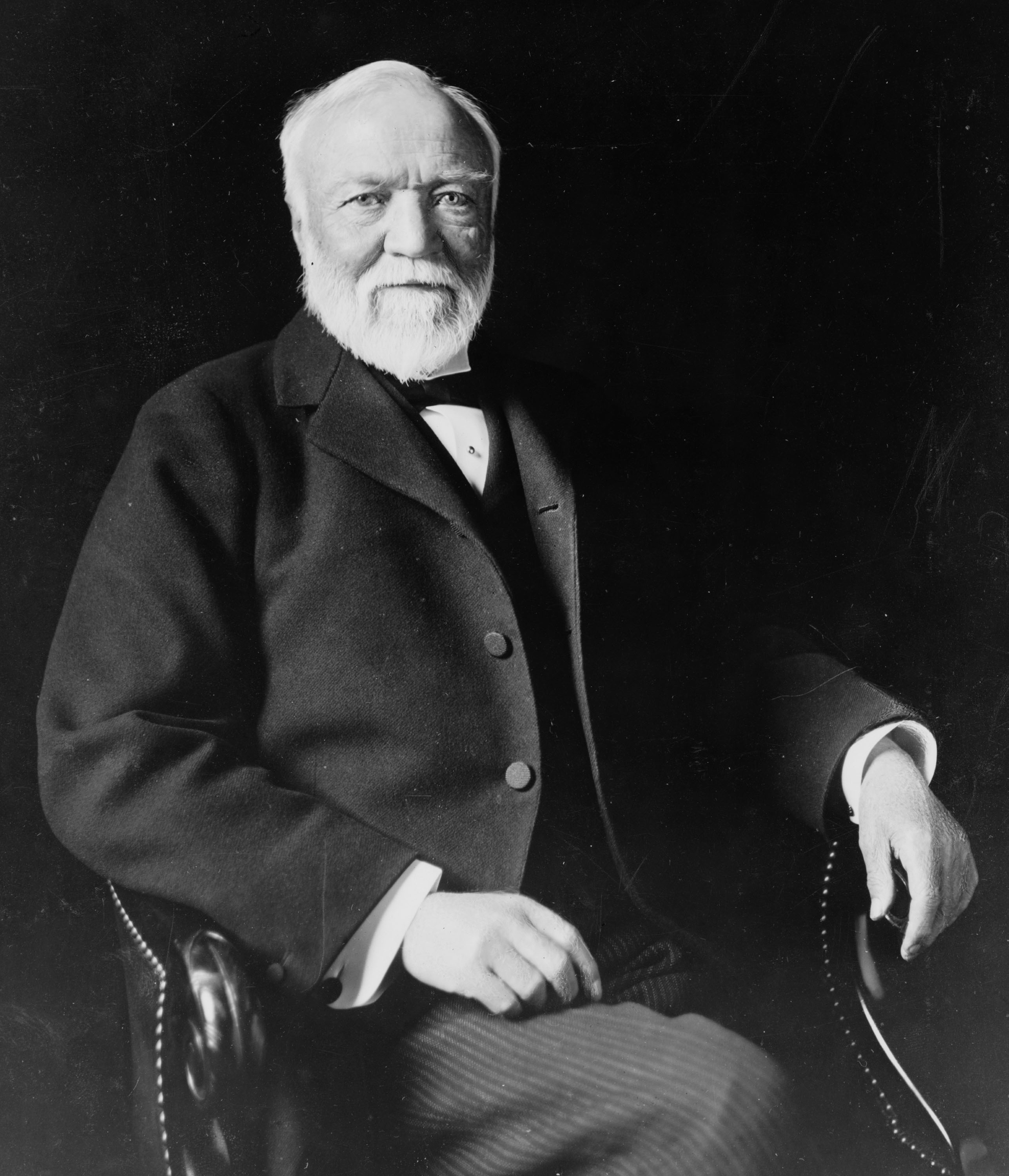
Andrew Carnegie

Investors have been acquiring businesses and making minority investments in privately held companies since the dawn of the industrial revolution. Merchant bankers in London and Paris financed industrial concerns in the 1850s; most notably Crédit Mobilier, founded in 1854 by Jacob and Isaac Pereire, who together with New York-based Jay Cooke financed the United States Transcontinental Railroad. Jay Gould also acquired, merged, and organized railroads and telegraph companies in the second half of the 19th century, including Western Union, the Erie Railroad, Union Pacific and the Missouri Pacific Railroad.

Later, J. Pierpont Morgan's J.P. Morgan & Co. would finance railroads and other industrial companies throughout the United States. In certain respects, J. Pierpont Morgan's 1901 acquisition of Carnegie Steel Company from Andrew Carnegie and Henry Phipps for $480 million represents the first true major buyout as they are thought of today.

Due to structural restrictions imposed on American banks under the Glass–Steagall Act and other regulations in the 1930s, there was no private merchant banking industry in the United States, a situation that was quite exceptional in developed nations. As late as the 1980s, Lester Thurow, a noted economist, decried the inability of the financial regulation framework in the United States to support merchant banks. US investment banks were confined primarily to advisory businesses, handling mergers and acquisitions transactions and placements of equity and debt securities. Investment banks would later enter the space, however long after independent firms had become well established.

With few exceptions, private equity in the first half of the 20th century was the domain of wealthy individuals and families. The Vanderbilts, Whitneys, Rockefellers and Warburgs were notable investors in private companies in the first half of the century. In 1938, Laurance S. Rockefeller helped finance the creation of both Eastern Air Lines and Douglas Aircraft and the Rockefeller family had vast holdings in a variety of companies. Eric M. Warburg founded E.M. Warburg & Co. in 1938, which would become Warburg Pincus, with investments in leveraged buyouts and venture capital.

== Origins of modern private equity ==
It was not until after World War II that what is considered today to be true private equity investments began to emerge marked by the founding of the first two venture capital firms in 1946: American Research and Development Corporation. (ARDC) and J.H. Whitney & Company.

ARDC was founded by Georges Doriot, the "father of venture capitalism" (former dean of Harvard Business School), with Ralph Flanders and Karl Compton (former president of MIT), to encourage private sector investments in businesses run by soldiers who were returning from World War II. ARDC's significance was primarily that it was the first institutional private equity investment firm that raised capital from sources other than wealthy families although it had several notable investment successes as well. ARDC is credited with the first major venture capital success story when its 1957 investment of $70,000 in Digital Equipment Corporation (DEC) would be valued at over $355 million after the company's initial public offering in 1968 (representing a return of over 500 times on its investment and an annualized rate of return of 101%). Former employees of ARDC went on to found several prominent venture capital firms including Greylock Partners (founded in 1965 by Charlie Waite and Bill Elfers) and Morgan, Holland Ventures, the predecessor of Flagship Ventures (founded in 1982 by James Morgan). ARDC continued investing until 1971 with the retirement of Doriot. In 1972, Doriot merged ARDC with Textron after having invested in over 150 companies.

J.H. Whitney & Company was founded by John Hay Whitney and his partner Benno Schmidt. Whitney had been investing since the 1930s, founding Pioneer Pictures in 1933 and acquiring a 15% interest in Technicolor Corporation with his cousin Cornelius Vanderbilt Whitney. By far, Whitney's most famous investment was in Florida Foods Corporation. The company, having developed an innovative method for delivering nutrition to American soldiers, later came to be known as Minute Maid orange juice and was sold to the Coca-Cola Company in 1960. J.H. Whitney & Company continues to make investments in leveraged buyout transactions and raised $750 million for its sixth institutional private equity fund in 2005.

Before World War II, venture capital investments (originally known as "development capital") were primarily the domain of wealthy individuals and families. One of the first steps toward a professionally managed venture capital industry was the passage of the Small Business Investment Act of 1958. The 1958 Act officially allowed the U.S. Small Business Administration (SBA) to license private "Small Business Investment Companies" (SBICs) to help the financing and management of the small entrepreneurial businesses in the United States. Passage of the Act addressed concerns raised in a Federal Reserve Board report to Congress that concluded that a major gap existed in the capital markets for long-term funding for growth-oriented small businesses. Additionally, it was thought that fostering entrepreneurial companies would spur technological advances to compete against the Soviet Union. Facilitating the flow of capital through the economy up to the pioneering small concerns in order to stimulate the U.S. economy was and still is the main goal of the SBIC program today. The 1958 Act provided venture capital firms structured either as SBICs or Minority Enterprise Small Business Investment Companies (MESBICs) access to federal funds which could be leveraged at a ratio of up to 4:1 against privately raised investment funds. The success of the Small Business Administration's efforts are viewed primarily in terms of the pool of professional private equity investors that the program developed as the rigid regulatory limitations imposed by the program minimized the role of SBICs. In 2005, the SBA significantly reduced its SBIC program, though SBICs continue to make private equity investments.

== Early venture capital and the growth of Silicon Valley (1959 - 1981) ==
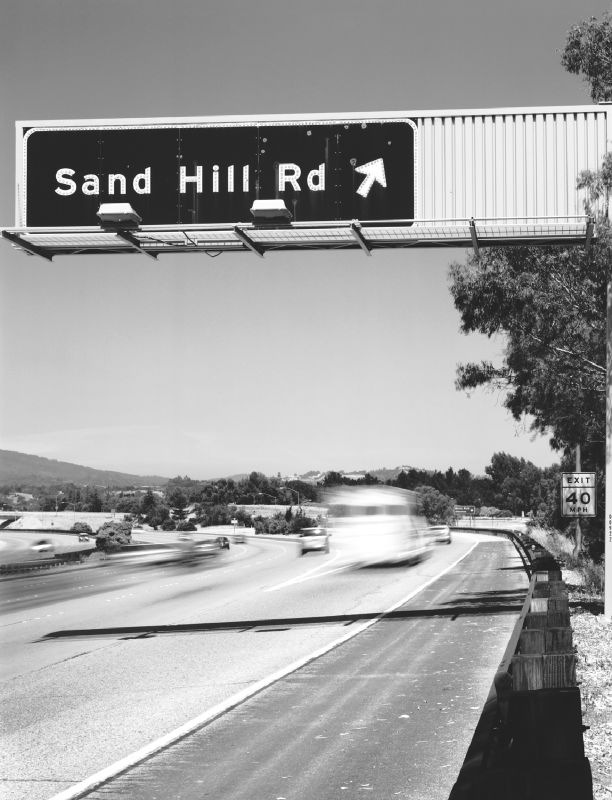
A freeway off-ramp leading to Sand Hill Road in Menlo Park, California, where many Bay Area venture capital firms are based

During the 1960s and 1970s, venture capital firms focused their investment activity primarily on starting and expanding companies. More often than not, these companies were exploiting breakthroughs in electronic, medical or data-processing technology. As a result, venture capital came to be almost synonymous with technology finance.

It is commonly noted that the first venture-backed startup was Fairchild Semiconductor (which produced the first commercially practicable integrated circuit), funded in 1959 by what would later become Venrock Associates. Venrock was founded in 1969 by Laurance S. Rockefeller, the fourth of John D. Rockefeller's six children as a way to allow other Rockefeller children to develop exposure to venture capital investments.

It was also in the 1960s that the common form of private equity fund, still in use today, emerged. Private equity firms organized limited partnerships to hold investments in which the investment professionals served as general partner and the investors, who were passive limited partners, put up the capital. The compensation structure, still in use today, also emerged with limited partners paying an annual management fee of 1-2% and a carried interest typically representing up to 20% of the profits of the partnership.

An early West Coast venture capital company was Draper and Johnson Investment Company, formed in 1962 by William Henry Draper III and Franklin P. Johnson Jr. In 1964 Bill Draper and Paul Wythes founded Sutter Hill Ventures, and Pitch Johnson formed Asset Management Company.

The growth of the venture capital industry was fueled by the emergence of the independent investment firms on Sand Hill Road, beginning with Kleiner, Perkins, Caufield & Byers and Sequoia Capital in 1972. Located, in Menlo Park, CA, Kleiner Perkins, Sequoia and later venture capital firms would have access to the burgeoning technology industries in the area. By the early 1970s, there were many semiconductor companies based in the Santa Clara Valley as well as early computer firms using their devices and programming and service companies. Throughout the 1970s, a group of private equity firms, focused primarily on venture capital investments, would be founded that would become the model for later leveraged buyout and venture capital investment firms. In 1973, with the number of new venture capital firms increasing, leading venture capitalists formed the National Venture Capital Association (NVCA). The NVCA was to serve as the industry trade group for the venture capital industry. Venture capital firms suffered a temporary downturn in 1974, when the stock market crashed and investors were naturally wary of this new kind of investment fund. It was not until 1978 that venture capital experienced its first major fundraising year, as the industry raised approximately $750 million. During this period, the number of venture firms also increased. Among the firms founded in this period, in addition to Kleiner Perkins and Sequoia, that continue to invest actively are:

- TA Associates, a venture capital firm (and later leveraged buyouts as well), originally part of the Tucker Anthony brokerage firm, founded in 1968;
- Mayfield Fund, founded by early Silicon Valley venture capitalist Tommy Davis in 1969;
- Apax Partners, the firm's earliest predecessor, the venture capital firm Patricof & Co. was founded in 1969 and subsequently merged with Multinational Management Group (founded 1972) and later with Saunders Karp & Megrue (founded 1989);
- Menlo Ventures, co-founded by H.DuBose Montgomery in 1976;
- New Enterprise Associates founded by Chuck Newhall, Frank Bonsal and Dick Kramlich in 1978;
- Oak Investment Partners founded in 1978; and
- Sevin Rosen Funds founded by L.J. Sevin and Ben Rosen in 1980.

Venture capital played an instrumental role in developing many of the major technology companies of the 1980s. Some of the most notable venture capital investments were made in firms that include:

- Tandem Computers, an early manufacturer of computer systems, founded in 1975 by Jimmy Treybig with funding from Kleiner, Perkins, Caufield & Byers.
- Genentech a biotechnology company, founded in 1976 with venture capital from Robert A. Swanson.
- Apple Inc., a designer and manufacturer of consumer electronics, including the Macintosh computer and in later years the iPod, founded in 1978. In December 1980, Apple went public. Its offering of 4.6 million shares at $22 each sold out within minutes. A second offering of 2.6 million shares quickly sold out in May 1981.
- Electronic Arts, a distributor of computer and video games found in May 1982 by Trip Hawkins with a personal investment of an estimated $200,000. Seven months later in December 1982, Hawkins secured $2 million of venture capital from Sequoia Capital, Kleiner, Perkins and Sevin Rosen Funds.
- Compaq, 1982, Computer manufacturer. In 1982, venture capital firm Sevin Rosen Funds provided $2.5 million to fund the startup of Compaq, which would ultimately grow into one of the largest personal computer manufacturers before merging with Hewlett Packard in 2002.
- Federal Express, Venture capitalists invested $80 million to help founder Frederick W. Smith purchase his first Dassault Falcon 20 airplanes.
- LSI Corporation was funded in 1981 with $6 million from noted venture capitalists including Sequoia Capital and Menlo Ventures. A second round of financing for an additional $16 million was completed in March 1982. The firm went public on May 13, 1983, netting $153 million, the largest technology IPO to that point.

== Early history of leveraged buyouts (1955-1981) ==
=== McLean Industries and public holding companies ===
Although not strictly private equity, and certainly not labeled so at the time, the first leveraged buyout may have been the purchase by Malcolm McLean's McLean Industries, Inc. of Pan-Atlantic Steamship Company in January 1955 and Waterman Steamship Corporation in May 1955. Under the terms of the transactions, McLean borrowed $42 million and raised an additional $7 million through an issue of preferred stock. When the deal closed, $20 million of Waterman cash and assets were used to retire $20 million of the loan debt. The newly elected board of Waterman then voted to pay an immediate dividend of $25 million to McLean Industries.

Similar to the approach employed in the McLean transaction, the use of publicly traded holding companies as investment vehicles to acquire portfolios of investments in corporate assets would become a new trend in the 1960s popularized by the likes of Warren Buffett (Berkshire Hathaway) and Victor Posner (DWG Corporation) and later adopted by Nelson Peltz (Triarc), Saul Steinberg (Reliance Insurance) and Gerry Schwartz (Onex Corporation). These investment vehicles would utilize a number of the same tactics and target the same type of companies as more traditional leveraged buyouts and in many ways could be considered a forerunner of the later private equity firms. In fact, it is Posner who is often credited with coining the term "leveraged buyout" or "LBO"

Posner, who had made a fortune in real estate investments in the 1930s and 1940s acquired a major stake in DWG Corporation in 1966. Having gained control of the company, he used it as an investment vehicle that could execute takeovers of other companies. Posner and DWG are perhaps best known for the hostile takeover of Sharon Steel Corporation in 1969, one of the earliest such takeovers in the United States. Posner's investments were typically motivated by attractive valuations, balance sheets and cash flow characteristics. Because of its high debt load, Posner's DWG would generate attractive but highly volatile returns and would ultimately land the company in financial difficulty. In 1987, Sharon Steel sought Chapter 11 bankruptcy protection.

Warren Buffett, who is typically described as a stock market investor rather than a private equity investor, employed many of the same techniques in the creation of his Berkshire Hathaway conglomerate as Posner's DWG Corporation and in later years by more traditional private equity investors. In 1965, with the support of the company's board of directors, Buffett assumed control of Berkshire Hathaway. At the time of Buffett's investment, Berkshire Hathaway was a textile company, however, Buffett used Berkshire Hathaway as an investment vehicle to make acquisitions and minority investments in dozens of the insurance and reinsurance industries (GEICO) and varied companies including: American Express, The Buffalo News, the Coca-Cola Company, Fruit of the Loom, Nebraska Furniture Mart and See's Candies. Buffett's value investing approach and focus on earnings and cash flows are characteristic of later private equity investors. Buffett would distinguish himself relative to more traditional leveraged buyout practitioners through his reluctance to use leverage and hostile techniques in his investments.

=== The pioneers of private equity ===
Lewis Cullman's acquisition of Orkin Exterminating Company in 1964 is among the first significant leveraged buyout transactions. However, the industry that is today described as private equity was conceived by several financiers, including Jerome Kohlberg Jr. and later his protégé, Henry Kravis. Working for Bear Stearns at the time, Kohlberg and Kravis along with Kravis' cousin George Roberts began a series of what they described as "bootstrap" investments. They targeted family-owned businesses, many of which had been founded in the years following World War II and by the 1960s and 1970s were facing succession issues. Many of these companies lacked a viable or attractive exit for their founders as they were too small to be taken public and the founders were reluctant to sell out to competitors, making a sale to a financial buyer potentially attractive. In the following years, the three Bear Stearns bankers would complete a series of buyouts including Stern Metals (1965), Incom (a division of Rockwood International, 1971), Cobblers Industries (1971) and Boren Clay (1973) as well as Thompson Wire, Eagle Motors and Barrows through their investment in Stern Metals. Although they had a number of highly successful investments, the $27 million investment in Cobblers ended in bankruptcy.

By 1976, tensions had built up between Bear Stearns and Kohlberg, Kravis and Roberts leading to their departure and the formation of Kohlberg Kravis Roberts in that year. Most notably, Bear Stearns executive Cy Lewis had rejected repeated proposals to form a dedicated investment fund within Bear Stearns and Lewis took exception to the amount of time spent on outside activities. Early investors included the Hillman family. By 1978, with the revision of the ERISA regulations, the nascent KKR was successful in raising its first institutional fund with approximately $30 million of investor commitments.

Meanwhile, in 1974, Thomas H. Lee founded a new investment firm to focus on acquiring companies through leveraged buyout transactions, one of the earliest independent private equity firms to focus on leveraged buyouts of more mature companies rather than venture capital investments in growth companies. Lee's firm, Thomas H. Lee Partners, while initially generating less fanfare than other entrants in the 1980s, would emerge as one of the largest private equity firms globally by the end of the 1990s.

The second half of the 1970s and the first years of the 1980s saw the emergence of several private equity firms that would survive through the various cycles both in leveraged buyouts and venture capital. Among the firms founded during these years were:

- Cinven, a European buyout firm, founded in 1977;
- Forstmann Little & Company one of the largest private equity firms through the end of the 1990s, founded in 1978 by Ted Forstmann, Nick Forstmann and Brian Little;
- Clayton, Dubilier & Rice founded as Clayton & Dubilier in 1978;
- Welsh, Carson, Anderson & Stowe founded by Pat Welsh, Russ Carson, Bruce Anderson and Richard Stowe in 1979;
- Candover, one of the earliest European buyout firms, founded in 1980; and
- GTCR and Thoma Cressey (Golder Thoma & Cressey, later Golder Thoma Cressey & Rauner) founded in 1980 by Stanley Golder, who built the private equity program at First Chicago Corp. that backed Federal Express.

Management buyouts also came into existence in the late 1970s and early 1980s. One of the most notable early management buyout transactions was the acquisition of Harley-Davidson. A group of managers at Harley-Davidson, the motorcycle manufacturer, bought the company from AMF in a leveraged buyout in 1981, but racked up big losses the following year and had to ask for protection from Japanese competitors.

=== Regulatory and tax changes impact the boom ===
The advent of the boom in leveraged buyouts in the 1980s was supported by multiple major legal and regulatory events.

In his first year in office, Jimmy Carter put forth a revision to the corporate tax system that would have, among other results, reduced the disparity in treatment of interest paid to bondholders and dividends paid to stockholders. Carter's proposals did not achieve support from the business community or Congress and was not enacted. Because of the different tax treatment, the use of leverage to reduce taxes was popular among private equity investors and would become increasingly popular with the reduction of the capital gains tax rate.

With the passage of the Employee Retirement Income Security Act (ERISA) in 1974, corporate pension funds were prohibited from holding certain risky investments including many investments in privately held companies. In 1975, fundraising for private equity investments cratered, according to the Venture Capital Institute, totaling only $10 million during the course of the year. In 1978, the US Labor Department relaxed certain of the ERISA restrictions, under the "prudent man rule", thus allowing corporate pension funds to invest in private equity resulting in a major source of capital available to invest in venture capital and other private equity. Time reported in 1978 that fund raising had increased from $39 million in 1977 to $570 million just one year later. Additionally, many of these same corporate pension investors would become active buyers of the high yield bonds (or junk bonds) that were necessary to complete leveraged buyout transactions.

On August 15, 1981, Ronald Reagan signed the Kemp-Roth bill, officially known as the Economic Recovery Tax Act of 1981, into law, lowering of the top capital gains tax rate from 28 percent to 20 percent, and making high risk investments even more attractive.

Private equity would experience its first major boom in subsequent years, acquiring some of the famed brands and major industrial powers of American business.

== The first private equity boom (1982 to 1993) ==
The decade of the 1980s is perhaps more closely associated with the leveraged buyout than any decade before or since. For the first time, the public became aware of the ability of private equity to affect mainstream companies, and "corporate raiders" and "hostile takeovers" entered the public consciousness. The decade would see one of the largest booms in private equity culminating in the 1989 leveraged buyout of RJR Nabisco, which would reign as the largest leveraged buyout transaction for nearly 17 years. The private equity industry would raise approximately $2.4 billion of annual investor commitments In 1980, and by the end of the decade that figure stood at $21.9 billion, marking the tremendous growth experienced.

== See also ==
- History of private equity and venture capital
  - Private equity in the 1980s
  - Private equity in the 1990s
  - Private equity in the 21st century
- Private equity firms (category)
- Venture capital firms (category)
- Private equity and venture capital investors (category)
- Financial sponsor
- Private equity firm
- Private equity fund
- Private equity secondary market
- Mezzanine capital
- Private investment in public equity
- Taxation of Private Equity and Hedge Funds
- Investment banking
- Mergers and acquisitions
