= Private equity in the 2000s =

Private equity in the 2000s represents one of the major growth periods in the history of private equity and venture capital. Within the broader private equity industry, two distinct sub-industries, leveraged buyouts and venture capital, expanded along parallel and interrelated tracks.

Private equity (PE) and venture capital (VC) evolved in the mid-20th century through a series of boom-and-bust business cycles. By 2000, the dot-com bubble had burst in the U.S., ending the rapid VC growth indicative of the previous five years. A third "Golden Age" of private equity ensued, during 2003–2007, as leveraged buyouts reached unparalleled size and PE firms achieved a high-growth in scale and institutionalization.

== Bursting the Internet Bubble and the private equity crash (2000–2003) ==
The technology-heavy NASDAQ Composite index peaked at 5,048 in March 2000, reflecting the high point of the dot-com bubble.

The Nasdaq crash and technology slump that started in March 2000 affected virtually the entire venture capital industry as valuations for startup technology companies collapsed. Over the next two years, many venture firms had been forced to write off large proportions of their investments and many funds were significantly "under water", leaving the values of a fund's investments below the amount of capital invested. Venture capital investors sought to reduce the size of commitments they had made to venture capital funds and, in numerous instances, investors sought to unload existing commitments for cents on the dollar in the secondary market. By mid-2003, the venture capital industry had shrunk to about half of its 2001 capacity. Two years later, the PricewaterhouseCoopers MoneyTree Survey showed that total venture capital investments held steady at 2003 levels through the second quarter of 2005.

Although the post-boom years represent just a small fraction of the peak levels of venture investment reached in 2000, they still represent an increase over the levels of investment from 1980 through 1995. As a percentage of GDP, venture investment was 0.058 percent in 1994, peaked at 1.087 percent (nearly 19 times the 1994 level) in 2000, and ranged from 0.164 to 0.182 percent in 2003 and 2004. The revival of an Internet-driven environment (thanks to deals such as eBay's purchase of Skype, the News Corporation's purchase of MySpace.com, and the very successful Google.com and Salesforce.com IPOs) have helped to revive the venture capital environment. However, as a percentage of the overall private equity market, venture capital has still not reached its mid-1990s level, let alone its peak in 2000.

=== Stagnation in the LBO market ===
Meanwhile, as the venture sector collapsed, the activity in the leveraged buyout market also declined significantly. Leveraged buyout firms had invested heavily in the telecommunications sector from 1996 to 2000 and profited from the boom which suddenly fizzled in 2001. In that year at least 27 major telecommunications companies, (i.e., with $100 million of liabilities or greater) filed for bankruptcy protection. Telecommunications, which made up a large portion of the overall high yield universe of issuers, dragged down the entire high yield market. Overall corporate default rates surged to levels unseen since the 1990 market collapse rising to 6.3 percent of high yield issuance in 2000 and 8.9 percent of issuance in 2001. Default rates on junk bonds peaked at 10.7 percent in January 2002 according to Moody's. As a result, leveraged buyout activity ground to a halt. The major collapses of former high-fliers including WorldCom, Adelphia Communications, Global Crossing and Winstar Communications were among the most notable defaults in the market. In addition to the high rate of default, many investors lamented the low recovery rates achieved through restructuring or bankruptcy.

Among the most affected by the bursting of the internet and telecom bubbles were two of the largest and most active private equity firms of the 1990s: Tom Hicks' Hicks Muse Tate & Furst and Ted Forstmann's Forstmann Little & Company. These firms were often cited as the highest profile private equity casualties, having invested heavily in technology and telecommunications companies. Hicks Muse's reputation and market position were both damaged by the loss of over $1 billion from minority investments in six telecommunications and 13 Internet companies at the peak of the 1990s stock market bubble. Similarly, Forstmann suffered major losses from investments in McLeodUSA and XO Communications. Tom Hicks resigned from Hicks Muse at the end of 2004 and Forstmann Little was unable to raise a new fund. The treasure of the State of Connecticut, sued Forstmann Little to return the state's $96 million investment to that point and to cancel the commitment it made to take its total investment to $200 million. The humbling of these private equity titans could hardly have been predicted by their investors in the 1990s and forced fund investors to conduct due diligence on fund managers more carefully and include greater controls on investments in partnership agreements.

Deals completed during this period tended to be smaller and financed less with high yield debt than in other periods. Private equity firms had to cobble together financing made up of bank loans and mezzanine debt, often with higher equity contributions than had been seen. Private equity firms benefited from the lower valuation multiples. As a result, despite the relatively limited activity, those funds that invested during the adverse market conditions delivered attractive returns to investors. Meanwhile, in Europe LBO activity began to increase as the market continued to mature. In 2001, for the first time, European buyout activity exceeded US activity with $44 billion of deals completed in Europe as compared with just $10.7 billion of deals completed in the US. This was a function of the fact that just six LBOs in excess of $500 million were completed in 2001, against 27 in 2000.

As investors sought to reduce their exposure to the private equity asset class, an area of private equity that was increasingly active in these years was the nascent secondary market for private equity interests. Secondary transaction volume increased from historical levels of two or three percent of private equity commitments to five percent of the addressable market in the early years of the new decade. Many of the largest financial institutions (e.g., Deutsche Bank, Abbey National, UBS AG) sold portfolios of direct investments and “pay-to-play” funds portfolios that were typically used as a means to gain entry to lucrative leveraged finance and mergers and acquisitions assignments but had created hundreds of millions of dollars of losses. Some of the most notable (publicly disclosed) secondary transactions, completed by financial institutions during this period, include:

- Chase Capital Partners sold a $500 million portfolio of private equity funds interests in 2000.
- National Westminster Bank completed the sale of over 250 direct equity investments valued at nearly $1 billion in 2000.
- UBS AG sold a $1.3 billion portfolio of private equity fund interests in over 50 funds in 2003.
- Deutsche Bank sold a $2 billion investment portfolio as part of a spin-out of MidOcean Partners, funded by a consortium of secondary investors, in 2003.
- Abbey National completed the sale of £748 million ($1.33 billion) of LP interests in 41 private equity funds and 16 interests in private European companies in early 2004.
- Bank One sold a $1 billion portfolio of private equity fund interests in 2004.

== Third private equity boom (2003–2007) ==
In 2003, following over two years of major losses in telecommunications and technology companies, as well as tight constraints by credit markets, private equity began a five-year resurgence that would ultimately result in the completion of 13 of the 15 largest leveraged buyout transactions in history; unprecedented levels of investment activity and investor commitments; and a major expansion and maturation of the leading private equity firms.

The combination of decreasing interest rates, loosening lending standards and regulatory changes for publicly traded companies would set the stage for the largest boom private equity had seen. The Sarbanes Oxley legislation, officially the Public Company Accounting Reform and Investor Protection Act, passed in 2002, in the wake of corporate scandals at Enron, WorldCom, Tyco, Adelphia, Peregrine Systems and Global Crossing, Qwest Communications International, among others, would create a new regime of rules and regulations for publicly traded corporations. In addition to the existing focus on short term earnings rather than long term value creation, many public company executives lamented the extra cost and bureaucracy associated with Sarbanes-Oxley compliance. For the first time, many large corporations saw private equity ownership as potentially more attractive than remaining public. Sarbanes-Oxley would have the opposite effect on the venture capital industry. The increased compliance costs would make it nearly impossible for venture capitalists to bring young companies to the public markets and dramatically reduced the opportunities for exits via IPO. Instead, venture capitalists have been forced increasingly to rely on sales to strategic buyers for an exit of their investment.

Interest rates, which began a major series of decreases in 2002 would reduce the cost of borrowing and increase the ability of private equity firms to finance large acquisitions. Lower interest rates would encourage investors to return to relatively dormant high-yield debt and leveraged loan markets, making debt more readily available to finance buyouts. Additionally, alternative investments also became increasingly important as investors sought yield despite increases in risk. This search for higher yielding investments would fuel larger funds and in turn larger deals, never thought possible, became reality.

Certain buyouts were completed in 2001 and early 2002, particularly in Europe where financing was more readily available. In 2001, for example, BT Group agreed to sell its international yellow pages directories business (Yell Group) to Apax Partners and Hicks, Muse, Tate & Furst for £2.14 billion (approximately $3.5 billion at the time), making it then the largest non-corporate LBO in European history. Yell later bought US directories publisher McLeodUSA for about $600 million, and floated on London's FTSE in 2003.

=== Resurgence of the large buyout ===
Marked by the two-stage buyout of Dex Media at the end of 2002 and 2003; large multibillion-dollar U.S. buyouts could once again obtain significant high-yield debt financing, and larger transactions could be completed. The Carlyle Group, Welsh, Carson, Anderson & Stowe, and other private investors, led a $7.5 billion buyout of QwestDex, marking the third largest corporate buyout since 1989. QwestDex's purchase occurred in two stages: a $2.75 billion acquisition of assets known as Dex Media East, in November 2002, and a $4.30 billion acquisition of assets known as Dex Media West, in 2003. R. H. Donnelley Corporation acquired Dex Media in 2006. Larger buyouts followed, signaling a resurgence in private equity, including Burger King by Bain Capital; Jefferson Smurfit by Madison Dearborn; Houghton Mifflin by Bain Capital, The Blackstone Group and Thomas H. Lee Partners; and TRW Automotive by Blackstone.

In 2006, USA Today reported retrospectively on the revival of private equity:

LBOs are back, only they've rebranded themselves private equity and vow a happier ending... The firms say this time it's completely different. Instead of buying companies and dismantling them, as was their rap in the '80s, private equity firms… squeeze more profit out of underperforming companies.

By 2004 and 2005, major buyouts were once again becoming common and market observers were stunned by the leverage levels and financing terms obtained by financial sponsors in their buyouts. Some of the notable buyouts of this period include:

- Dollarama (2004) – The U.S. chain of "dollar stores" was sold for $850 million to Bain Capital.
- Toys "R" Us (2004) – A consortium of Bain Capital, KKR and real estate development company Vornado Realty Trust announced the $6.6 billion acquisition of the toy retailer. A month earlier, Cerberus Capital Management, made a $5.5 billion offer for both the toy and baby supplies businesses.
- The Hertz Corporation (2005) – Carlyle Group, Clayton, Dubilier & Rice and Merrill Lynch completed the $15.0 billion leveraged buyout of the largest car rental agency from Ford.
- Metro-Goldwyn-Mayer (2005) – A consortium led by Sony and TPG Capital completed the $4.81 billion buyout of the film studio. The consortium also included media-focused firms Providence Equity Partners and Quadrangle Group as well as DLJ Merchant Banking Partners.
- SunGard (2005) – SunGard was acquired by a consortium of seven private equity investment firms in a transaction valued at $11.3 billion. The partners in the acquisition were Silver Lake Partners, which led the deal as well as Bain Capital, Blackstone, Goldman Sachs Alternatives, KKR, Providence Equity Partners, and TPG. This represented the largest leveraged buyout completed since the takeover of RJR Nabisco at the end of the 1980s leveraged buyout boom. Also, at the time of its announcement, SunGard would be the largest buyout of a technology company in history, a distinction it would cede to the buyout of Freescale Semiconductor. The SunGard transaction is also notable in the number of firms involved in the transaction. The involvement of seven firms in the consortium was criticized by investors in private equity who considered cross-holdings among firms to be generally unattractive.

=== Age of the mega-buyout ===
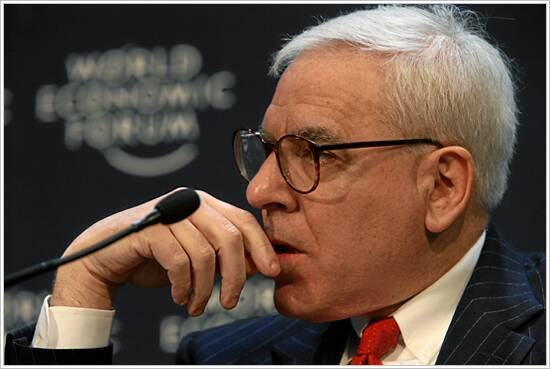
David Rubenstein, the head of the Carlyle Group, the largest private equity firm (by investor commitments) during the 2006-07 buyout boom.

As 2005 ended and 2006 began, new "largest buyout" records were set and surpassed several times with nine of the top ten buyouts at the end of 2007 having been announced in an 18-month window from the beginning of 2006 through the middle of 2007. Additionally, the buyout boom was not limited to the United States as industrialized countries in Europe and the Asia-Pacific region also saw new records set. In 2006, private equity firms bought 654 U.S. companies for $375 billion, representing 18 times the level of transactions closed in 2003. Additionally, U.S. based private equity firms raised $215.4 billion in investor commitments to 322 funds, surpassing the previous record set in 2000 by 22 percent and 33 percent higher than the 2005 fundraising total. However, venture capital funds, which were responsible for much of the fundraising volume in 2000 (the height of the dot-com bubble), raised only $25.1 billion in 2006, a two percent decline from 2005 and a significant decline from its peak. The following year, despite the onset of turmoil in the credit markets in the summer, saw yet another record year of fundraising with $302 billion of investor commitments to 415 funds.

- Georgia-Pacific Corp (2005) – In December 2005, Koch Industries, a privately owned company controlled by Charles G. Koch and David H. Koch, acquired pulp and paper producer Georgia-Pacific for $21 billion. The acquisition marked the first buyout in excess of $20 billion and largest buyout overall since RJR Nabisco and pushed Koch Industries ahead of Cargill as the largest privately held company in the US, based on revenue.
- Albertson's (2006) – Albertson's accepted a $15.9 billion takeover offer ($9.8 billion in cash and stock and the assumption of $6.1 billion in debt) from SuperValu to buy most Albertson's grocery operations. The drugstore chain CVS Caremark acquired 700 stand-alone Sav-On and Osco pharmacies and a distribution center, and a group including Cerberus Capital Management and the Kimco Realty Corporation acquired some 655 underperforming grocery stores and a number of distribution centers.
- EQ Office (2006) – The Blackstone Group completed the $37.7 billion acquisition of one of the largest owners of commercial office properties in the US. At the time of its announcement, the EQ Office buyout became the largest in history, surpassing the buyout of HCA. It would later be surpassed by the buyouts of TXU and BCE (announced but as of the end of the first quarter of 2008 not yet completed).
- Freescale Semiconductor (2006) – A consortium led by Blackstone and including the Carlyle Group, Permira and the TPG Capital completed the $17.6 billion takeover of the semiconductor company. At the time of its announcement, Freescale would be the largest leveraged buyout of a technology company ever, surpassing the 2005 buyout of SunGard.
- GMAC (2006) – General Motors sold a 51 percent majority stake in its financing arm, GMAC Financial Services to a consortium led by Cerberus Capital Management, valuing the company at $16.8 billion. Separately, General Motors sold a 78 percent stake in GMAC (now Ally Financial) Commercial Holding Corporation, renamed Capmark, its real estate venture, to a group of investors headed by KKR and Goldman Sachs Alternatives in a $1.5 billion deal. In June 2008, GMAC completed a $60 billion refinancing aimed at improving the liquidity of its struggling mortgage subsidiary, Residential Capital (GMAC ResCap) including $1.4 billion of additional equity contributions from the parent and Cerberus.
- HCA (2006) – KKR and Bain Capital, together with Merrill Lynch and the Frist family (which had founded the company) completed a $31.6 billion acquisition of the hospital company, 17 years after it was taken private for the first time in a management buyout. At the time of its announcement, the HCA buyout would be the first of several to set new records for the largest buyout, eclipsing the 1989 buyout of RJR Nabisco. It was later surpassed by the buyouts of EQ Office, TXU and BCE (announced but as of the end of the first quarter of 2008 not yet completed).
- Kinder Morgan (2006) – A consortium of private equity firms including Goldman Sachs Alternatives, Carlyle Group and Riverstone Holdings completed a $27.5 billion (including assumed debt) acquisition of one of the largest pipeline operators in the US. The buyout was backed by Richard Kinder, the company's co-founder and a former president of Enron.
- Harrah's Entertainment (2006) – Apollo Global Management and TPG Capital completed the $27.39 billion (including purchase of the outstanding equity for $16.7 billion and assumption of $10.7 billion of outstanding debt) acquisition of the gaming company.
- TDC A/S (2006) – The Danish phone company was acquired by KKR, Apax Partners, Providence Equity Partners and Permira for €12.2 billion ($15.3 billion), which at the time made it the second largest European buyout in history.
- Sabre Holdings (2006) – TPG and Silver Lake Partners announced a deal to buy Sabre Holdings, which operates Travelocity, Sabre Travel Network and Sabre Airline Solutions, for approximately $4.3 billion in cash, plus the assumption of $550 million in debt. Earlier in the year, Blackstone acquired Sabre's chief competitor Travelport.
- Travelport (2006) – Travelport, which owns Worldspan and Galileo as well as approximately 48 percent of Orbitz Worldwide was acquired from Cendant by The Blackstone Group, One Equity Partners and Technology Crossover Ventures in a deal valued at $4.3 billion. The sale of Travelport followed the spin-offs of Cendant's real estate and hospitality businesses, Realogy and Wyndham Worldwide, respectively, in July 2006. Later in the year, TPG and Silver Lake would acquire Travelport's chief competitor Sabre Holdings.
- Alliance Boots (2007) – KKR and Stefano Pessina, the company’s deputy chairman and largest shareholder, acquired the UK drug store retailer for £12.4 billion ($24.8 billion) including assumed debt, after increasing their bid more than 40 percent amidst intense competition from Terra Firma Capital Partners and Wellcome Trust. The buyout came only a year after the merger of Boots Group plc (Boots the Chemist), and Alliance UniChem plc.
- Biomet (2007) – Blackstone, KKR, TPG and Goldman Sachs Alternatives acquired the medical devices company for $11.6 billion.
- Chrysler (2007) – Cerberus Capital Management completed the $7.5 billion acquisition of 80.1 percent of the U.S. car manufacturer. Only $1.45 billion of proceeds were expected to be paid to Daimler and does not include nearly $600 million of cash Daimler agreed to invest in Chrysler. With the company struggling, Cerberus brought in former Home Depot CEO, Robert Nardelli as the new chief executive of Chrysler to execute a turnaround of the company.
- First Data (2007) – KKR and TPG completed the $29 billion buyout of the credit and debit card payment processor and former parent of Western Union Michael Capellas, previously the CEO of MCI Communications and Compaq was named CEO of the privately held company.
- TXU (2007) – An investor group led by KKR and TPG and together with Goldman Sachs Alternatives completed the $44.37 billion buyout of the regulated utility and power producer. The investor group had to work closely with ERCOT regulators to gain approval of the transaction but had significant experience with the regulators from their earlier buyout of Texas Genco.
- BCE (2008) – On July 4, 2008, BCE announced that a final agreement had been reached on the terms of the purchase, with all financing in place, and Michael Sabia left BCE, with George Cope assuming the position of CEO on July 11. The deal's final closing date was scheduled for December 11, 2008 with a value of $51.7 billion (Canadian). The company failed a solvency test by KPMG that was required for the merger to take place. The deal was canceled when the results of the test were released.

=== Publicly traded private equity ===
Although there had previously been certain instances of publicly traded private equity vehicles, the convergence of private equity and the public equity markets attracted significantly greater attention when several of the largest private equity firms pursued various options through the public markets. Taking private equity firms and private equity funds public appeared an unusual move since private equity funds often buy public companies listed on exchange and then take them private. Private equity firms are rarely subject to the quarterly reporting requirements of the public markets and tout this independence to prospective sellers as a key advantage of going private. Nevertheless, there are fundamentally two separate opportunities that private equity firms pursued in the public markets. These options involved a public listing of either:

- A private equity firm (the management company), which provides shareholders an opportunity to gain exposure to the management fees and carried interest earned by the investment professionals and managers of the private equity firm. The most notable example of this public listing was completed by The Blackstone Group in 2007
- A private equity fund or similar investment vehicle, which allows investors that would otherwise be unable to invest in a traditional private equity limited partnership to gain exposure to a portfolio of private equity investments.

In May 2006, KKR raised $5 billion in an initial public offering for a new permanent investment vehicle (KKR Private Equity Investors or KPE) listing it on the Euronext exchange in Amsterdam (ENXTAM: KPE). KKR raised more than three times what it had expected at the outset as many of the investors in KPE were hedge funds seeking exposure to private equity but could not make long-term commitments to private equity funds. Because private equity had been booming in the preceding years, the proposition of investing in a KKR fund appeared attractive to certain investors. However, KPE's first-day performance was lackluster, trading down 1.7 percent and trading volume was limited. Initially, a handful of other private equity firms and hedge funds had planned to follow KKR's lead but shelved those plans when KPE's performance continued to falter after its IPO. KPE's stock declined from an IPO price of €25 per share to €18.16, a 27 percent decline, at the end of 2007, and a low of €11.45, a 54.2 percent decline, per share in Q1 2008. KPE disclosed in May 2008 that it had completed approximately $300 million of secondary sales of selected limited partnership interests in and undrawn commitments to certain KKR-managed funds in order to generate liquidity and repay borrowings.

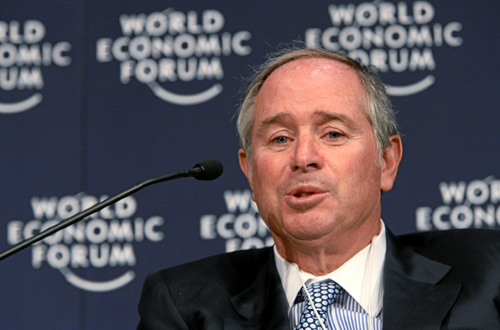
Schwarzman's The Blackstone Group completed the first major IPO of a private equity firm in June 2007.

On March 22, 2007, Blackstone filed with the SEC to raise $4 billion in an initial public offering. On June 21, Blackstone traded a 12.3 percent stake in its ownership for $4.13 billion in the largest U.S. IPO since 2002. Traded on the New York Stock Exchange under the ticker symbol BX, Blackstone priced at $31 per share on June 22, 2007.

Less than two weeks after Blackstone’s IPO, rival firm KKR filed with the SEC in July 2007 to raise $1.25 billion by selling an ownership interest in its management company. KKR had previously listed its KKR Private Equity Investors (KPE) private equity fund vehicle in 2006. The onset of the credit crunch and the shutdown of the IPO market would dampen the prospects of obtaining a valuation that would be attractive to KKR and the flotation was repeatedly postponed.

Meanwhile, other private equity investors were seeking to realize a portion of the value locked into their firms. In September 2007, the Carlyle Group sold a 7.5 percent interest in its management company to Mubadala Development Company, which is owned by the Abu Dhabi Investment Authority (ADIA) for $1.35 billion, which valued Carlyle at approximately $20 billion. Similarly, in January 2008, Silver Lake Partners sold a 9.9 percent stake in its management company to the California Public Employees' Retirement System (CalPERS) for $275 million.

Additionally, Apollo Global Management completed a private placement of shares in its management company in July 2007. By pursuing a private placement rather than a public offering, Apollo would be able to avoid much of the public scrutiny applied to Blackstone and KKR. In April 2008, Apollo filed with the SEC to permit some holders of its privately traded stock to sell their shares on the New York Stock Exchange. In April 2004, Apollo raised $930 million for a listed business development company, Apollo Investment Corporation (NASDAQ: AINV), to invest primarily in middle-market companies in the form of mezzanine debt and senior secured loans, as well as by making direct equity investments in companies. The company also invests in the securities of public companies.

Historically, in the United States, there had been a group of publicly traded private equity firms that were registered as business development companies (BDCs) under the Investment Company Act of 1940. Typically, BDCs are structured similar to real estate investment trusts (REITs) in that the BDC structure reduces or eliminates corporate income tax. In return, REITs are required to distribute 90 percent of their income, which may be taxable to its investors. As of the end of 2007, among the largest BDCs (by market value, excluding Apollo Investment Corp, discussed earlier) are: American Capital Strategies (NASDAQ:ACAS), Allied Capital Corp (NASDAQ:ALD), Ares Capital Corporation (NASDAQ:ARCC), Gladstone Investment Corp (NASDAQ:GAIN) and Kohlberg Capital Corp (NASDAQ:KCAP).

=== Secondary market and the evolution of the private equity asset class ===
In the wake of the collapse of the equity markets in 2000, many investors in private equity sought an early exit from their outstanding commitments. The surge in activity in the secondary market, which had previously been a relatively small niche of the private equity industry, prompted new entrants to the market, however the market was still characterized by limited liquidity and distressed prices with private equity funds trading at significant discounts to fair value.

Beginning in 2004 and extending through 2007, the secondary market transformed into a more efficient market in which assets for the first time traded at or above their estimated fair values and liquidity increased dramatically. During these years, the secondary market transitioned from a niche sub-category in which the majority of sellers were distressed to an active market with ample supply of assets and numerous market participants. By 2006 active portfolio management had become far more common in the increasingly developed secondary market and an increasing number of investors had begun to pursue secondary sales to rebalance their private equity portfolios. The continued evolution of the private equity secondary market reflected the maturation and evolution of the larger private equity industry. Among the most notable publicly disclosed secondary transactions (it is estimated that over two-thirds of secondary market activity is never disclosed publicly):

- CalPERS, in 2008, agrees to the sale of a portfolio of a $2 billion portfolio of legacy private equity funds to a consortium of secondary market investors.
- Ohio Bureau of Workers' Compensation, in 2007, reportedly agreed to sell a $400 million portfolio of private equity fund interests
- MetLife, in 2007, agreed to sell a $400 million portfolio of over 100 private equity fund interests.
- Bank of America, in 2007, completed the spin-out of BA Venture Partners to form Scale Venture Partners, which was funded by an undisclosed consortium of secondary investors.
- Mellon Financial Corporation, following the announcement of its merger with Bank of New York in 2006, sold a $1.4 billion portfolio of private equity fund and direct interests.
- American Capital Strategies, in 2006, sold a $1 billion portfolio of investments to a consortium of secondary buyers.
- Bank of America, in 2006, completes the spin-out of BA Capital Europe to form Argan Capital, which was funded by an undisclosed consortium of secondary investors.
- JPMorgan Chase, in 2006, completed the sale of a $925 million interest in JPMP Global Fund to a consortium of secondary investors.
- Temasek Holdings, in 2006, completes $810 million securitization of a portfolio of 46 private equity funds.
- Dresdner Bank, in 2005, sells a $1.4 billion private equity funds portfolio.
- Dayton Power & Light, an Ohio-based electric utility, in 2005, sold a $1.2 billion portfolio of private equity fund interests

== The credit crunch and post-modern private equity (2007–2008) ==
In July 2007, turmoil that had been affecting the mortgage markets, spilled over into the leveraged finance and high-yield debt markets. The markets had been highly robust during the first six months of 2007, with highly issuer friendly developments including PIK and PIK Toggle (interest is "Payable In Kind") and covenant light debt widely available to finance large leveraged buyouts. July and August saw a notable slowdown in issuance levels in the high yield and leveraged loan markets with only few issuers accessing the market. Uncertain market conditions led to a significant widening of yield spreads, which coupled with the typical summer slowdown led to many companies and investment banks to put their plans to issue debt on hold until the autumn. However, the expected rebound in the market after Labor Day 2007 did not materialize and the lack of market confidence prevented deals from pricing. By the end of September, the full extent of the credit situation became obvious as major lenders including Citigroup and UBS AG announced major writedowns due to credit losses. The leveraged finance markets came to a near standstill. As a result of the sudden change in the market, buyers would begin to withdraw from or renegotiate the deals completed at the top of the market:

- Harman International (announced and withdrawn, 2007)

Kohlberg Kravis Roberts and Goldman Sachs Alternatives announced the $8 billion takeover of Harman, the maker of JBL speakers and Harman Kardon, in April 2008. In a novel part of the deal, the buyers offered Harman shareholders a chance to retain up to a 27 percent stake in the newly private company and share in any profit made if the company is later sold or taken public as a concession to shareholders. However, in September 2007 the buyers withdrew from the deal, saying that the company’s financial health had suffered from a material adverse change.

- Sallie Mae (announced 2007; withdrawn 2008) – SLM Corporation (NYSE: SLM), commonly known as Sallie Mae, announced plans to be acquired by a consortium of private equity firms and large investment banks including JC Flowers, Friedman Fleischer & Lowe, Bank of America and JPMorgan Chase With the onset of the credit crunch in July 2007, the buyout of Sallie Mae encountered difficulty.
- Clear Channel Communications (2007) – After pursuing the company for over six months Bain Capital and Thomas H. Lee Partners finally won the support of shareholders to complete a $26.7 billion (including assumed debt) buyout of the radio station operator. The buyout had the support of the founding Mays family but the buyers were required initially to push for a proxy vote before raising their offer several times. As a result of the credit crunch, the banks sought to pull their commitments to finance the acquisition of Clear Channel. The buyers filed suit against the bank group (including Citigroup, Morgan Stanley, Deutsche Bank, Credit Suisse, the Royal Bank of Scotland and Wachovia) to force them to fund the transaction. Ultimately, the buyers and the banks were able to renegotiate the transaction, reducing the purchase price paid to the shareholders and increasing the interest rate on the loans.
- BCE (2007) – The Ontario Teachers' Pension Plan, Providence Equity Partners and Madison Dearborn announced a C$51.7 billion (including debt) buyout of BCE in July 2007, which would constitute the largest leveraged buyout in history, exceeding the record set previously by the buyout of TXU. Since its announcement, the buyout has faced a number of challenges including issues with lenders and courts in Canada.

The credit crunch prompted buyout firms to pursue a new group of transactions in order to deploy their massive investment funds, including Private Investment in Public Equity (PIPE) transactions, as well as purchases of debt in existing leveraged buyout transactions. Some of the most notable of these transactions completed in the depths of the credit crunch include:

- Citigroup Loan Portfolio (2008) – As the credit crunch reached its peak in the first quarter of 2008, Apollo Global Management, TPG Capital and The Blackstone Group completed the acquisition of $12.5 billion of bank loans from Citigroup. The portfolio was composed primarily of senior secured leveraged loans that had been made to finance leveraged buyout transactions at the peak of the market. Citigroup had been unable to syndicate the loans before the onset of the credit crunch. The loans were believed to have been sold in the "mid-80 cents on the dollar" relative to face value.
- Washington Mutual (2008) – An investment group led by TPG Capital invested $7 billion—of which TPG committed $1.5 billion—in new capital in the struggling savings and loan to shore up the company's finances.

== Contemporary reflections of private equity and private equity controversies ==
Carlyle group featured prominently in Michael Moore's 2003 film Fahrenheit 9-11. The film suggested that The Carlyle Group exerted tremendous influence on U.S. government policy and contracts through their relationship with the president's father, George H. W. Bush, a former senior adviser to the Carlyle Group. Additionally, Moore cited relationships with the Bin Laden family. The movie quotes author Dan Briody claiming that the Carlyle Group "gained" from September 11 because it owned United Defense, a military contractor, although the firm's $11 billion Crusader artillery rocket system developed for the U.S. Army is one of the few weapons systems canceled by the Bush administration.

Over the next few years, attention intensified on private equity as the size of transactions and profile of the companies increased. The attention would increase significantly following a series of events involving The Blackstone Group: the firm's initial public offering and the birthday celebration of its CEO. The Wall Street Journal observing Blackstone's Steve Schwarzman's 60th birthday celebration in February 2007 described the event as follows:

The Armory's entrance hung with banners painted to replicate Mr. Schwarzman's sprawling Park Avenue apartment. A brass band and children clad in military uniforms ushered in guests. A huge portrait of Mr. Schwarzman, which usually hangs in his living room, was shipped in for the occasion. The affair was emceed by comedian Martin Short. Rod Stewart performed. Composer Marvin Hamlisch did a number from "A Chorus Line." Singer Patti LaBelle led the Abyssinian Baptist Church choir in a tune about Mr. Schwarzman. Attendees included Colin Powell and New York Mayor Michael Bloomberg. The menu included lobster, baked Alaska and a 2004 Louis Jadot Chassagne Montrachet, among other fine wines.

Schwarzman received a severe backlash from both critics of the private equity industry and fellow investors in private equity. The lavish event which reminded many of the excesses of notorious executives including Bernie Ebbers (WorldCom) and Dennis Kozlowski (Tyco International). David Rubenstein, the founder of The Carlyle Group remarked, "We have all wanted to be private – at least until now. When Steve Schwarzman's biography with all the dollar signs is posted on the web site none of us will like the furor that results – and that's even if you like Rod Stewart."

Rubenstein's fears would be confirmed when in 2007, the Service Employees International Union launched a campaign against private equity firms, specifically the largest buyout firms through public events, protests as well as leafleting and web campaigns. A number of leading private equity executives were targeted by the union members however the SEIU's campaign was not nearly as effective at slowing the buyout boom as the credit crunch of 2007 and 2008 would ultimately prove to be.

In 2008, the SEIU would shift part of its focus from attacking private equity firms directly toward the highlighting the role of sovereign wealth funds in private equity. The SEIU pushed legislation in California that would disallow investments by state agencies (particularly CalPERS and CalSTRS) in firms with ties to certain sovereign wealth funds. Additionally, the SEIU has attempted to criticize the treatment of taxation of carried interest. The SEIU, and other critics, point out that many wealthy private equity investors pay taxes at lower rates (because the majority of their income is derived from carried interest, payments received from the profits on a private equity fund's investments) than many of the rank and file employees of a private equity firm's portfolio companies. In 2009, the Canadian regulatory bodies set up rigorous regulation for dealers in exempt (non-publicly traded) securities. Exempt-market dealers sell securities that are exempt from prospectus requirements and must register with the Ontario Securities Commission.

== See also ==
- History of private equity and venture capital
  - Early history of private equity
  - Private equity in the 1980s
  - Private equity in the 1990s
- Private equity firms (category)
- Venture capital firms (category)
- Private equity and venture capital investors (category)
- Financial sponsor
- Private equity firm
- Private equity fund
- Private equity secondary market
- Variable interest entity
- Mezzanine capital
- Private investment in public equity
- Taxation of Private Equity and Hedge Funds
- Investment banking
- Mergers and acquisitions
