= Private equity in the 1980s =

Private equity in the 1980s relates to one of the major periods in the history of private equity and venture capital. Within the broader private equity industry, two distinct sub-industries, leveraged buyouts and venture capital experienced growth along parallel although interrelated tracks.

The development of the private equity and venture capital asset classes has occurred through a series of boom and bust cycles since the middle of the 20th century. The 1980s saw the first major boom and bust cycle in private equity. The cycle which is typically marked by the 1982 acquisition of Gibson Greetings and ending just over a decade later was characterized by a dramatic surge in leveraged buyout (LBO) activity financed by junk bonds. The period culminated in the massive buyout of RJR Nabisco before the near collapse of the leveraged buyout industry in the late 1980s and early 1990s marked by the collapse of Drexel Burnham Lambert and the high-yield debt market.

== Beginning of the LBO boom ==
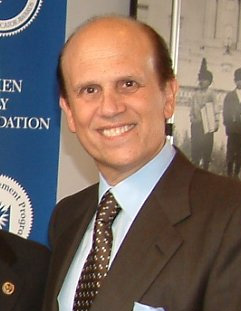
Michael Milken, the man credited with creating the market for high yield "junk" bonds and spurring the LBO boom of the 1980s

The beginning of the first boom period in private equity would be marked by the well-publicized success of the Gibson Greetings acquisition in 1982 and would roar ahead through 1983 and 1984 with the soaring stock market driving profitable exits for private equity investors.

In January 1982, former US Secretary of the Treasury William E. Simon, Ray Chambers and a group of investors, which would later come to be known as Wesray Capital Corporation, acquired Gibson Greetings, a producer of greeting cards. The purchase price for Gibson was $80 million, of which only $1 million was rumored to have been contributed by the investors. By mid-1983, just sixteen months after the original deal, Gibson completed a $290 million IPO and Simon made approximately $66 million. Simon and Wesray would later complete the $71.6 million acquisition of Atlas Van Lines. The success of the Gibson Greetings investment attracted the attention of the wider media to the nascent boom in leveraged buyouts.

Between 1979 and 1989, it was estimated that there were over 2,000 leveraged buyouts valued in excess of $250 billion Notable buyouts of this period (not described elsewhere in this article) include:

- Malone & Hyde, 1984

KKR completed the first buyout of a public company by tender offer, by acquiring the food distributor and supermarket operator together with the company's chairman Joseph R. Hyde III.

- Wometco Enterprises, 1984

KKR completed the first billion-dollar buyout transaction to acquire the leisure-time company with interests in television, movie theaters and tourist attractions. The buyout comprised the acquisition of 100% of the outstanding shares for $842 million and the assumption of $170 million of the company's outstanding debt.

- Beatrice Companies, 1985

KKR sponsored the $6.1 billion management buyout of Beatrice, which owned Samsonite and Tropicana among other consumer brands. At the time of its closing in 1985, Beatrice was the largest buyout completed.

- Sterling Jewelers, 1985

One of Thomas H. Lee's early successes was the acquisition of Akron, Ohio-based Sterling Jewelers for $28 million. Lee reported put in less than $3 million and when the company was sold two years later for $210 million walked away with over $180 million in profits. The combined company was an early predecessor to what is now Signet Group, one of Europe's largest jewelry retail chains.

- Revco Drug Stores , 1986

The drug store chain was taken private in a management buyout transaction. However, within two years the company was unable to support its debt load and filed for bankruptcy protection. Bondholders in the Revco buyout ultimately contended that the buyout was so poorly constructed that the transaction should have been unwound.

- Safeway, 1986

KKR completed a friendly $5.5 billion buyout of supermarket operator, Safeway, to help management avoid hostile overtures from Herbert and Robert Haft of Dart Drug. Safeway was taken public again in 1990.

- Southland Corporation, 1987

John Thompson, son of the founder of convenience store operator 7-Eleven, completed a $5.2 billion management buyout of the company. The buyout suffered from the 1987 stock market crash and after failing initially raise high yield debt financing, the company was required to offer a portion of the company's stock as an inducement to invest in the company's bonds.

- Jim Walter Corp (later Walter Industries, Inc.), 1987

KKR acquired the company for $3.3 billion in early 1988 but faced issues with the buyout almost immediately. Most notably, a subsidiary of Jim Walter Corp (Celotex) faced a large asbestos lawsuit and incurred liabilities that the courts ruled would need to be satisfied by the parent company. In 1989, the holding company that KKR used for the Jim Walter buyout filed for Chapter 11 bankruptcy protection.

- BlackRock, 1988

Blackstone Group began the leveraged buildup of BlackRock, which is an asset manager. Blackstone sold its interest in 1994 and today BlackRock is listed on the New York Stock Exchange.

- Federated Department Stores, 1988

Robert Campeau's Campeau Corporation completed a $6.6 billion merger with Federated, owner of the Bloomingdale's, Filene's and Abraham & Straus department stores.

- Marvel Entertainment, 1988

Ronald Perelman acquired the company and oversaw a major expansion of its titles in the early 1990s before taking the company public on the New York Stock Exchange in 1991. The company would later suffer as a result of its massive debt load and ultimately the bondholders, led by Carl Icahn would take control of the company.

- Uniroyal Goodrich Tire Company, 1988

Clayton & Dubilier acquired Uniroyal Goodrich Tire Company from B.F. Goodrich and other investors for $225 million. Two years later, in October 1990, Uniroyal Goodrich Tire Company was sold to Michelin for $1.5 billion.

- Hospital Corporation of America, 1989

The hospital operator was acquired for $5.3 billion in a management buyout led by Chairman Thomas J. Frist and completed a successful initial public offering in the 1990s. The company would be taken private again 17 years later in 2006 by KKR, Bain Capital and Merrill Lynch.

Because of the high leverage on many of the transactions of the 1980s, failed deals occurred regularly, however the promise of attractive returns on successful investments attracted more capital. With the increased leveraged buyout activity and investor interest, the mid-1980s saw a major proliferation of private equity firms. Among the major firms founded in this period were:

- Bain Capital founded in 1984 by Mitt Romney, T. Coleman Andrews III and Eric Kriss out of the management consulting firm Bain & Company;
- Chemical Venture Partners, later Chase Capital Partners and JPMorgan Partners, and today CCMP Capital, founded in 1984, as a captive investment group within Chemical Bank;
- Hellman & Friedman founded in 1984;
- Hicks & Haas, later Hicks Muse Tate & Furst, and today HM Capital (and its European spinoff Lion Capital), as well as the predecessor of Haas, Wheat & Partners, founded in 1984;
- Blackstone Group, one of the largest private equity firms, founded in 1985 by Peter G. Peterson and Stephen A. Schwarzman;
- Doughty Hanson, a European focused firm, founded in 1985;
- BC Partners, a European focused firm, founded in 1986; and
- Carlyle Group founded in 1987 by Stephen L. Norris and David M. Rubenstein.

Additionally, as the market developed, new niches within the private equity industry began to emerge. In 1982, Venture Capital Fund of America, the first private equity firm focused on acquiring secondary market interests in existing private equity funds was founded and then, two years later in 1984, First Reserve Corporation, the first private equity firm focused on the energy sector, was founded.

== Venture capital in the 1980s ==
The public successes of the venture capital industry in the 1970s and early 1980s (e.g., DEC, Apple, Genentech) gave rise to a major proliferation of venture capital investment firms. From just a few dozen firms at the start of the decade, there were over 650 firms by the end of the 1980s, each searching for the next major "home run". While the number of firms multiplied, the capital managed by these firms increased only 11% from $28 billion to $31 billion over the course of the decade.

The growth the industry was hampered by sharply declining returns and certain venture firms began posting losses for the first time. In addition to the increased competition among firms, several other factors impacted returns. The market for initial public offerings cooled in the mid-1980s before collapsing after the stock market crash in 1987 and foreign corporations, particularly from Japan and Korea, flooded early stage companies with capital.

In response to the changing conditions, corporations that had sponsored in-house venture investment arms, including General Electric and Paine Webber either sold off or closed these venture capital units. Additionally, venture capital units within Chemical Bank (today CCMP Capital), Citicorp (today Court Square Capital Partners and CVC Capital Partners, First Chicago Bank (the predecessor of GTCR and Madison Dearborn Partners) and Continental Illinois National Bank (today CIVC Partners), among others, began shifting their focus from funding early stage companies toward investments in more mature companies. Even industry founders J.H. Whitney & Company and Warburg Pincus began to transition toward leveraged buyouts and growth capital investments. Many of these venture capital firms attempted to stay close to their areas of expertise in the technology industry by acquiring companies in the industry that had reached certain levels of maturity. In 1989, Prime Computer was acquired in a $1.3 billion leveraged buyout by J.H. Whitney & Company in what would prove to be a disastrous transaction. Whitney's investment in Prime proved to be nearly a total loss with the bulk of the proceeds from the company's liquidation paid to the company's creditors.

Although lower profile than their buyout counterparts, new leading venture capital firms were also formed including Institutional Venture Partners (IVP) in 1980, Draper Fisher Jurvetson (originally Draper Associates) in 1985 and Canaan Partners in 1987 among others.

== Corporate raiders, hostile takeovers and greenmail ==
Although the "corporate raider" moniker is rarely applied to contemporary private equity investors, there is no formal distinction between a "corporate raid" and other private equity investments acquisitions of existing businesses. The label was typically ascribed by constituencies within the acquired company or the media. However, a corporate raid would typically feature a leveraged buyout that would involve a hostile takeover of the company, perceived asset stripping, major layoffs or other significant corporate restructuring activities. Management of many large publicly traded corporations reacted negatively to the threat of potential hostile takeover or corporate raid and pursued drastic defensive measures including poison pills, golden parachutes and increasing debt levels on the company's balance sheet. Additionally, the threat of the corporate raid would lead to the practice of "greenmail", where a corporate raider or other party would acquire a significant stake in the stock of a company and receive an incentive payment (effectively a bribe) from the company in order to avoid pursuing a hostile takeover of the company. Greenmail represented a transfer payment from a company's existing shareholders to a third-party investor and provided no value to existing shareholders but did benefit existing managers. The practice of greenmail is not typically considered a tactic of private equity investors and is not condoned by market participants.

Among the most notable corporate raiders of the 1980s were Carl Icahn, Victor Posner, Nelson Peltz, Robert M. Bass, T. Boone Pickens, Harold Clark Simmons, Kirk Kerkorian, Sir James Goldsmith, Saul Steinberg and Asher Edelman. Icahn developed a reputation as a ruthless corporate raider after his hostile takeover of TWA in 1985. The result of that takeover was Icahn systematically selling TWA's assets to repay the debt he used to purchase the company, which was described as asset stripping. In later years, many of the corporate raiders would be re-characterized as "Activist shareholders".

Many of the corporate raiders were onetime clients of Michael Milken, whose investment banking firm, Drexel Burnham Lambert, helped raise blind pools of capital with which corporate raiders could make a legitimate attempt to take over a company and provided high-yield debt financing of the buyouts.

Drexel Burnham raised a $100 million blind pool in 1984 for Peltz and his holding company Triangle Industries (later Triarc) to give credibility for takeovers, representing the first major blind pool raised for this purpose. Two years later, in 1986, Wickes Companies, a holding company run by Sanford C. Sigoloff, raised a $1.2 billion blind pool.

In 1985, Milken raised $750 million for a similar blind pool for Ronald Perelman which would ultimately prove instrumental in acquiring his biggest target: The Revlon Corporation. In 1980, Ronald Perelman, the son of a wealthy Philadelphia businessman, and future "corporate raider" having made several small but successful buyouts, acquired MacAndrews & Forbes, a distributor of licorice extract and chocolate, that Perelman's father had tried and failed to acquire 10 years earlier. Perelman would ultimately divest the company's core business and use MacAndrews & Forbes as a holding company investment vehicle for subsequent leveraged buyouts including Technicolor, Inc., Pantry Pride and Revlon. Using the Pantry Pride subsidiary of his holding company MacAndrews & Forbes Holdings, Perelman's overtures were rebuffed. Repeatedly rejected by the company's board and management, Perelman continued to press forward with a hostile takeover, raising his offer from an initial bid of $47.50 per share until it reached $53.00 per share. After receiving a higher offer from a white knight, private equity firm Forstmann Little & Company, Perelman's Pantry Pride made a successful bid for Revlon, valuing the company at $2.7 billion. The buyout proved troubling, burdened by a heavy debt load. Under Perelman's control, Revlon sold four divisions: two of them were sold for $1 billion, its vision care division was sold for $574 million, and its National Health Laboratories division was spun out to the public market in 1988. Revlon also made acquisitions including Max Factor in 1987 and Betrix in 1989, later selling them to Procter & Gamble in 1991. Perelman exited the bulk of his holdings in Revlon through an IPO in 1996 and subsequent sales of stock. As of December 31, 2007, Perelman still retains a minority ownership interest in Revlon. The Revlon takeover, because of its well-known brand, was profiled widely by the media and brought new attention to the emerging boom in leveraged buyout activity.

In later years, Milken and Drexel would shy away from certain of the more "notorious" corporate raiders as Drexel and the private equity industry attempted to move upscale.

== RJR Nabisco and the Barbarians at the Gate ==
Leveraged buyouts in the 1980s including Perelman's takeover of Revlon came to epitomize the "ruthless capitalism" and "greed" popularly seen to be pervading Wall Street at the time. One of the final major buyouts of the 1980s proved to be its most ambitious and marked both a high-water mark and a sign of the beginning of the end of the boom that had begun nearly a decade earlier. In 1989, KKR closed on a $31.1 billion takeover of RJR Nabisco. It was, at that time and for over 17 years, the largest leveraged buyout in history. The event was chronicled in the book, Barbarians at the Gate: The Fall of RJR Nabisco, and later made into a television movie starring James Garner.

F. Ross Johnson was the President and CEO of RJR Nabisco at the time of the leveraged buyout and Henry Kravis was a general partner at Kohlberg Kravis Roberts. The leveraged buyout was in the amount of $25 billion (plus assumed debt), and the battle for control took place in October and November 1988. KKR would eventually prevail in acquiring RJR Nabisco at $109 per share marking a dramatic increase from the original announcement that Shearson Lehman Hutton would take RJR Nabisco private at $75 per share. A fierce series of negotiations and horse-trading ensued which pitted KKR against Shearson Lehman Hutton and later Forstmann Little & Co. Many of the major banking players of the day, including Morgan Stanley, Goldman Sachs, Salomon Brothers, and Merrill Lynch were actively involved in advising and financing the parties.

After Shearson Lehman's original bid, KKR quickly introduced a tender offer to obtain RJR Nabisco for $90 per share—a price that enabled it to proceed without the approval of RJR Nabisco's management. RJR's management team, working with Shearson Lehman and Salomon Brothers, submitted a bid of $112, a figure they felt certain would enable them to outflank any response by Kravis's team. KKR's final bid of $109, while a lower dollar figure, was ultimately accepted by the board of directors of RJR Nabisco. KKR's offer was guaranteed, whereas the management offer (backed by Shearson Lehman and Salomon) lacked a "reset", meaning that the final share price might have been lower than their stated $112 per share. Additionally, many in RJR's board of directors had grown concerned at recent disclosures of Ross Johnson' unprecedented golden parachute deal. TIME magazine featured Ross Johnson on the cover of their December 1988 issue along with the headline, "A Game of Greed: This man could pocket $100 million from the largest corporate takeover in history. Has the buyout craze gone too far?". KKR's offer was welcomed by the board, and, to some observers, it appeared that their elevation of the reset issue as a deal-breaker in KKR's favor was little more than an excuse to reject Ross Johnson's higher payout of $112 per share. F. Ross Johnson received $53 million from the buyout.

At $31.1 billion of transaction value, RJR Nabisco was by far the largest leveraged buyout in history. In 2006 and 2007, a number of leveraged buyout transactions were completed that for the first time surpassed the RJR Nabisco leveraged buyout in terms of nominal purchase price. However, adjusted for inflation, none of the leveraged buyouts of the 2006 – 2007 period would surpass RJR Nabisco. Unfortunately for KKR, size would not equate with success as the high purchase price and debt load would burden the performance of the investment.

Two years earlier, in 1987, Jerome Kohlberg, Jr. resigned from Kohlberg Kravis Roberts & Co. over differences in strategy. Kohlberg did not favor the larger buyouts (including Beatrice Companies (1985) and Safeway (1986) and would later likely have included the 1989 takeover of RJR Nabisco), highly leveraged transactions or hostile takeovers being pursued increasingly by KKR. The split would ultimately prove acrimonious as Kohlberg sued Kravis and Roberts for what he alleged were improper business tactics. The case was later settled out of court. Instead, Kohlberg chose to return to his roots, acquiring smaller, middle-market companies and in 1987, he would found a new private equity firm Kohlberg & Company along with his son James A. Kohlberg, at the time a KKR executive. Jerome Kohlberg would continue investing successfully for another seven years before retiring from Kohlberg & Company in 1994 and turning his firm over to his son.

As the market reached its peak in 1988 and 1989, new private equity firms were founded which would emerge as major investors in the years to follow, including:

- Code Hennessy & Simmons, a middle market private equity firm, founded in 1988;
- Coller Capital, the first European secondaries firm specializing in the purchase of existing private equity interests, founded in 1989;
- Landmark Partners, an early secondaries firm specializing in the purchase of existing private equity interests, founded in 1989;
- Leonard Green & Partners founded in 1989 a successor to Gibbons, Green van Amerongen (founded 1969), a merchant banking firm that completed several early management buyout transactions; and
- Providence Equity Partners, a media-focused firm, founded in 1989.

== LBO bust (1990 to 1992) ==
By the end of the 1980s the excesses of the buyout market were beginning to show, with the bankruptcy of several large buyouts including Robert Campeau's 1988 buyout of Federated Department Stores, the 1986 buyout of the Revco drug stores, Walter Industries, FEB Trucking and Eaton Leonard. Additionally, the RJR Nabisco deal was showing signs of strain, leading to a recapitalization in 1990 that involved the contribution of $1.7 billion of new equity from KKR. Additionally, in response to the threat of unwelcome LBOs, certain companies adopted a number of techniques, such as the poison pill, to protect them against hostile takeovers by effectively self-destructing the company if it were to be taken over.

== Contemporary reflections of private equity ==
=== 1980s reflections of private equity ===
Although private equity rarely received a thorough treatment in popular culture, several films did feature stereotypical "corporate raiders" prominently. Among the most notable examples of private equity featured in motion pictures included:

- Wall Street (1987) – The notorious "corporate raider" and "greenmailer" Gordon Gekko, who represents a synthesis of the worst features of various famous private equity figures, intends to manipulate an ambitious young stockbroker to take over a failing airline. Although Gekko makes a pretense of caring about the airline, he intends to “wreck” the airline, strip its assets, and lay off its employees before raiding the corporate pension fund. Gekko would become a symbol in popular culture for unrestrained greed (with the signature line, "Greed, for lack of a better word, is good") that would be attached to the private equity industry.
- Other People's Money (1991) – A self-absorbed corporate raider "Larry the Liquidator" (Danny DeVito), sets his sights on New England Wire and Cable, a small-town business run by family patriarch Gregory Peck who is principally interested in protecting his employees and the town.
- Pretty Woman (1990) – Although Richard Gere's profession is incidental to the plot, the selection of the corporate raider who intends to destroy the hard work of a family-run business by acquiring the company in a hostile takeover and then sell off the company's parts for a profit (compared in the movie to an illegal chop shop). Ultimately, the corporate raider is won over and chooses not to pursue his original plans for the company.

== See also ==
- History of private equity and venture capital
  - Early history of private equity
  - Private equity in the 1990s
  - Private equity in the 21st century
- Private equity firms (category)
- Venture capital firms (category)
- Private equity and venture capital investors (category)
- Financial sponsor
- Private equity firm
- Private equity fund
- Private equity secondary market
- Mezzanine capital
- Private investment in public equity
- Taxation of Private Equity and Hedge Funds
- Investment banking
- Mergers and acquisitions
