= Blocker corporation =

Type of corporation in the United States

A blocker corporation is a type of C Corporation in the United States that has been used by tax exempt individuals to protect their investments from taxation when they participate in private equity or with hedge funds. In addition to tax exempt individuals, foreign investors have also used blocker corporations.

== Application ==
Most private equity funds and hedge funds are composed as limited partnerships, or as LLCs (Limited Liability Company) which for tax purposes is considered a Limited Partnership, unless the fund formally elects to be taxed as a corporation. This allows the fund itself to avoid taxation, as each of the individual investors is taxed as a partner with respect to the share of profits attributable to the partner's personal equity interest. By comparison, a fund set up as a C Corporation would be subject to tax for its earnings, and then the limited partners would be subject to tax when they received their profit in the form of dividends distributed by the corporation. Thus, the LLC or LP format allows a fund to avoid double taxation.

When there are tax exempt investors in a fund, they are not subject to U.S. income tax, but are still required to declare and pay taxes on "Unrelated Business Taxable Income" or "UBTI". For tax exempt investors, dividends, royalties, rents, capital gains and interest income are not considered UBTI, but any money earned from conduct unrelated to the entity's tax exempt purpose is considered UBTI.

However, if a foreign investor conducts a trade or business within the United States, it is required to file a U.S. tax return and pay taxes on the same terms as a U.S. individual or corporation. In both cases, because partners are treated as earning their share of the partnership's income on a flow-through basis, they are treated as engaged in a U.S. trade or business or an unrelated business to the extent that the partnership is so engaged.

To address these issues, a private equity fund can set up a U.S. feeder corporation known as a blocker corporation. The foreign and tax exempt investors can invest through the blocker corporation, and then they are no longer personally considered to be partners, as it is the domestic corporation that is the owner of equity in the fund. For tax exempt investors, their share of the blocker corporation is considered dividend income, and thus they are not subject to tax. Foreign investors similarly avoid U.S. trade or business income tax (although they will be subject to tax in their home country on any dividends received). The blocker corporation itself is subject, however, to tax on its share of the partnership's income.

== See also ==
- Foundation (nonprofit organization)
- Individual retirement account
- International taxation
- Pension fund
- Taxation of private equity and hedge funds
