= S corporation =

US tax term for a type of company

An S corporation (or S corp), for United States federal income tax, is a closely held corporation (or, in some cases, a limited liability company (LLC) or a partnership) that makes a valid election to be taxed under Subchapter S of Chapter 1 of the Internal Revenue Code. In general, S corporations do not pay any income taxes. Instead, the corporation's income and losses are divided among and passed through to its shareholders. The shareholders must then report the income or loss on their own individual income tax returns.

== Overview ==
S corporations are ordinary business corporations that elect to pass corporate income, losses, deductions, and credits through to their shareholders for federal tax purposes. The term "S corporation" means a "small business corporation" which has made an election under § 1362(a) to be taxed as an S corporation.

The S corporation rules are contained in Subchapter S of Chapter 1 of the Internal Revenue Code (sections 1361 through 1379). The United States Congress, acting on the Department of Treasury's suggestion of 1946, created this chapter in 1958 as part of a larger package of miscellaneous tax items. S status combines the legal environment of C corporations with U.S. federal income taxation similar to that of partnerships.

As with partnerships, the income, deductions, and tax credits of an S corporation flow through to shareholders annually, regardless of whether distributions are made. Thus, income is taxed at the shareholder level and not at the corporate level. Payments to S shareholders by the corporation are distributed tax-free to the extent that the distributed earnings were previously taxed.

=== Versus C corporations ===
Like a C corporation, an S corporation is generally a corporation under the law of the state in which the entity is organized. With modern incorporation statutes making the establishment of a corporation relatively easy, firms that might traditionally have been run as partnerships or sole proprietorships are often run as corporations with a small number of shareholders in order to take advantage of the beneficial features of the corporate form; this is particularly true of firms established prior to the advent of the modern limited liability company. Therefore, taxation of S corporations resembles that of partnerships.

Unlike a C corporation, an S corporation is not eligible for a dividends received deduction and not subject to the ten percent of taxable income limitation applicable to charitable contribution deductions.

== Eligibility ==
A corporation is eligible if it:

- Has no more than 100 shareholders,
- Has shareholders who are all individuals (exceptions are made for various tax-exempt organizations, estates, and trusts)
- Has no nonresident shareholders, and
- Has only one class of stock.

A limited liability company (LLC) is eligible to be taxed as an S corporation under the check-the-box regulations at § 301.7701-2. The LLC first elects to be taxed as a corporation, at which point it becomes a corporation for tax purposes; then it makes the S corporation election under section 1362(a).

=== Shareholder requirements ===
Shareholders must be U.S. citizens or residents (not nonresident), and must be natural persons, so corporations and partnerships are ineligible shareholders. Certain trusts, estates, and tax-exempt corporations, notably 501(c)(3) corporations, are permitted to be shareholders. An S corporation may be a shareholder in another, subsidiary S corporation if the first S corporation owns 100% of the stock of the subsidiary corporation, and an election is made to treat the subsidiary corporation as a "qualified subchapter S subsidiary" (QSub). After the election is made, the subsidiary corporation is not treated as a separate corporation for tax purposes, and all "assets, liabilities, and items of income, deduction, and credit" of the QSub are treated belonging to the parent S corporation.

Spouses (and their estates) are automatically treated as a single shareholder. Families, defined as individuals descended from a common ancestor, plus spouses and former spouses of either the common ancestor or anyone lineally descended from that person, are considered a single shareholder as long as any family member elects such treatment.

=== Stock requirements ===
An S corporation may only have one class of stock. A single class of stock means that all outstanding shares of stock confer "identical rights to distribution and liquidation proceeds," i.e. profits and losses are allocated to shareholders proportionately to each one's interest in the business. § 1.1361-1(l)(1). Differences in voting rights are disregarded, which means that an S corporation may have voting and nonvoting stock. If a corporation meets the foregoing requirements and wishes to be taxed under Subchapter S, its shareholders may file Form 2553: "Election by a Small Business Corporation" with the Internal Revenue Service (IRS). The Form 2553 must be signed by all of the corporation's shareholders. If a shareholder resides in a community property state, the shareholder's spouse generally must also sign the 2553.

The S corporation election must typically be made by the fifteenth day of the third month of the tax year for which the election is intended to be effective, or at any time during the year immediately preceding the tax year. Congress has directed the IRS to show leniency with regard to late S elections. Accordingly, often, the IRS will accept a late S election. If a corporation that has elected to be treated as an S corporation ceases to meet the requirements (for example, if as a result of stock transfers, the number of shareholders exceeds 100 or an ineligible shareholder such as a nonresident acquires a share), the corporation will lose its S corporation status and revert to being a regular C corporation.

An S corporation's election will also terminate if, for each of three consecutive years, (i) its passive investment income exceeds 25% of gross receipts and (ii) it has accumulated earnings and profits. § 1362(d)(3). An S corporation will only have accumulated earnings and profits if it was a C corporation at some time, or acquired or merged with a C corporation.

== Taxation ==
The S election affects the treatment of the corporation for Federal income tax purposes. The election does not change the requirements for that corporation for other Federal taxes such as FICA and Federal unemployment taxes.

=== Distributions ===
While an S corporation is not taxed on its profits, the owners of an S corporation are taxed on their proportional shares of the S corporation's profits.

Actual distributions of funds, as opposed to distributive shares, typically have no effect on shareholder tax liability. The term "pass through" refers not to assets distributed by the corporation to the shareholder, but instead to the portion of the corporation's income, losses, deductions or credits that are reported to the shareholder on Schedule K-1 and are shown by the shareholder on his or her own income tax return. A distribution to a shareholder that is in excess of the shareholder's basis in his or her stock is taxed to the shareholder as capital gain.

Quarterly estimated taxes must be paid by the individual to avoid tax penalties, even if this income is "phantom income".

==== Example ====
Widgets Inc., an S Corp, makes $10,000,000 in net income (before payroll) in 2006 and is owned 51% by Alex and 49% by Jesse. Keeping it simple, Alex and Jesse both draw salaries of $94,200 (which is the Social Security Wage Base for 2006, after which no further Social Security tax is owed).

Employee salaries are subject to FICA tax (Social Security & Medicare tax) – currently 15.3 percent (6.2% Social Security paid by the employee; 6.2% Social Security paid by the employer; 1.45% employee Medicare and 1.45% employer Medicare). The distribution of the additional profits from the S corporation will be done without any further FICA tax liability.

If for some reason, Alex (as the majority owner) were to decide not to distribute the money, both Alex and Jesse would still owe taxes on their pro-rata allocation of business income, even though neither received any cash distribution. To avoid this "phantom income" scenario, S corporations commonly use shareholder agreements that stipulate at least enough distribution must be made for shareholders to pay the taxes on their distributive shares.

=== Conversion from C corporation ===
S corporations that have previously been C corporations may also, in certain circumstances, pay income taxes on untaxed profits that were generated when the corporation operated as a C corporation. This is very common with uncollected accounts receivable or appreciated real estate.

For example, if an S corporation that was formerly a C corporation sells an appreciated asset (such as real estate) and the appreciation occurred during the time the corporation was a C corporation, the S corporation will probably pay C corporation taxes on the appreciation – even though the corporation is now an S corporation. This Built In Gain (BIG) tax rate is 35% on the appreciated property, but is only realized if the BIG property is sold within 10 years (starting from the first day of the first tax year of conversion to S –Corp status). The American Recovery and Reinvestment Act of 2009 reduced that 10-year recognition period to seven years (if that seventh year precedes either 2009 or 2010). The Small Business Jobs Act of 2010 further reduced the recognition period to five years.

=== Federal tax ===
==== Taxable income to shareholders ====
If a shareholder owns more than 2% of the outstanding stock, amounts paid for group health insurance for that shareholder are included on their W-2 as "wages". The same applies to amounts contributed to health savings accounts (HSA).

==== Filing Form 1120S ====
Form 1120S generally must be filed by March 15 of the year immediately following the calendar year covered by the return or, if a fiscal year (a year ending on the last day of a month other than December) is used, by the 15th day of the third month immediately following the last day of the fiscal year. The corporation must complete a Schedule K-1 for each person who was a shareholder at any time during the tax year and file it with the IRS along with Form 1120S. The second copy of the Schedule K-1 must be mailed to the shareholder.

==== FICA ====
As is the case for any other corporation, the FICA tax is imposed only with respect to employee wages and not on distributive shares of shareholders. Although FICA tax is not owed on distributive shares, the IRS and equivalent state revenue agencies may recategorize distributions paid to shareholder-employees as wages if shareholder-employees are not paid a reasonable wage for the services they perform in their positions within the company.

==== Reporting compliance ====
In 2005, the IRS launched a study to assess the reporting compliance of S corporations The study began in late 2005 and examined 5,000 randomly selected S corporation returns from tax years 2003 and 2004. The IRS intends to use the results to measure compliance in recording of income, deductions and credits from S corporations, and to formulate future audit criteria to better target likely non-compliant returns. This is part of a larger IRS effort to improve tax compliance and reduce the estimated $300 billion gap in gross reported figures each year. A large portion of that gap is thought to come from small businesses (and particularly S corporations, which are now the most common corporate entity, numbering over four million in 2011, up from three million in 2002 and about 750,000 in 1985).

=== State tax ===
States impose tax laws and regulations for corporate income and distributions, some of which may be directed specifically at S Corporations. Some but not all states recognize a state tax law equivalent to an S corporation, so that the S corporation in certain states may be treated the same way for state income tax purposes as it is treated for Federal purposes. A state taxing authority may require that a copy of the Form 1120S return be submitted to the state with the state income tax return.

Some states such as New York and New Jersey require a separate state-level S election in order for the corporation to be treated, for state tax purposes, as an S corporation.

==== California ====
S corporations pay a franchise tax of 1.5% of net income in the state of California (minimum $800). This is one factor to be taken into consideration when choosing between a limited liability company and an S corporation in California. For highly profitable enterprises, the LLC franchise tax fees (minimum $800), which are based on gross revenues, may be lower than the 1.5% net income tax. Conversely, for high-gross-revenue, low-profit-margin businesses, the LLC franchise tax fees may exceed the S corporation net income tax.

==== Delaware ====
S Corporations operating in the City of Wilmington are not subject to the city's 1.25% net profits tax. Employee wages are subject to the city's 1.25% wage tax.

==== New York City ====
In New York City, S corporations are subject to the full corporate income tax at an 8.85% rate. If one can demonstrate that a portion of its business was done outside the city, that portion will not be subject to the additional tax.

==== Philadelphia ====
In Philadelphia, S corporations are subject to the city's income tax (6.35%) and gross receipts tax (1.415%), but not the net profits tax (3.8907%). They pay Pennsylvania's flat personal income tax rate of 3.07% instead of the corporate 9.99%.
