= C corporation =

One of four main types of U.S. corporations

A C corporation, under United States federal income tax law, is any corporation that is taxed separately from its owners. A C corporation is distinguished from an S corporation, which generally is not taxed separately. Many companies, including most major corporations, are treated as C corporations for U.S. federal income tax purposes. C corporations and S corporations both enjoy limited liability, but only C corporations are subject to corporate income taxation.

== Versus S corporations ==
Generally, all for-profit corporations are automatically classified as a C corporation unless the corporation elects the option to treat the corporation as a flow-through entity known as an S corporation. An S corporation is not subject to income tax; rather, its shareholders are subject to tax on their pro rata shares of income based on their shareholdings. To qualify to make the S corporation election, the corporation's shares must be held by residents, citizens or certain qualifying trusts. A corporation may qualify as a C corporation without regard to any limit on the number of shareholders, foreign or domestic.

== Formation ==
In the United States, corporations are formed under laws of a state or the District of Columbia. Procedures vary widely by state. Some states allow formation of corporations through electronic filing on the state's web site. All states require payment of a fee (often under $200) upon incorporation. Corporations are issued a certificate of incorporation by most states upon formation. Most state corporate laws require that the basic governing instrument be either the certificate of incorporation or formal articles of incorporation. Many corporations also adopt additional governing rules known as bylaws. Most state laws require at least one director and at least two officers, all of whom may be the same person. Generally, there are no residency requirements for officers or directors. Foreign aliens are obligated to form corporations via registered agents in many states.

== Financial statements ==
C Corporations that are publicly traded are required to issue financial statements in the United States. Financial statements may be presented on any comprehensive basis, including an income tax basis. There is no requirement for appointment of auditors, unless the corporation is publicly traded and thus subject to the requirements of the Sarbanes–Oxley Act.

== Distributions ==
Any distribution from the earnings and profits of a C corporation is treated as a dividend for U.S. income tax purposes. "Earnings and profits" is a tax law concept similar to the financial accounting concept of retained earnings. Exceptions apply to treat certain distributions as made in exchange for stock rather than as dividends. Such exceptions include distributions in complete termination of a shareholder's interest and distributions in liquidation of the corporation.

== Tax rates ==
The corporate tax rate is a flat 21% starting January 1, 2018 after the passage of the Tax Cuts and Jobs Act of 2017, on December 20, 2017.

Taxable income ($)	Tax rate
$1 and beyond	21%

Up through 2017, the Internal Revenue Service (IRS) imposed tax based on the following schedule for "most corporations", except "qualified personal service corporations" and certain other cases:

Taxable Income ($)		Tax Rate	Of amount over
Over	But not over	Tax Rate	Of amount over
$0	$50,000	15%	$0
$50,000	$75,000	$7,500 + 25%	$50,000
$75,000	$100,000	$13,750 + 34%	$75,000
$100,000	$335,000	$22,250 + 39%	$100,000
$335,000	$10,000,000	$113,900 + 34%	$335,000
$10,000,000	$15,000,000	$3,400,000 + 35%	$10,000,000
$15,000,000	$18,333,333	$5,150,000 + 38%	$15,000,000
$18,333,333	—	35%	$18,333,333

== See also ==
- Benefit corporation
- Blocker corporation
- Corporate tax in the United States
