= Sand Hill Road =

Road in Silicon Valley, California; home to venture capital firms

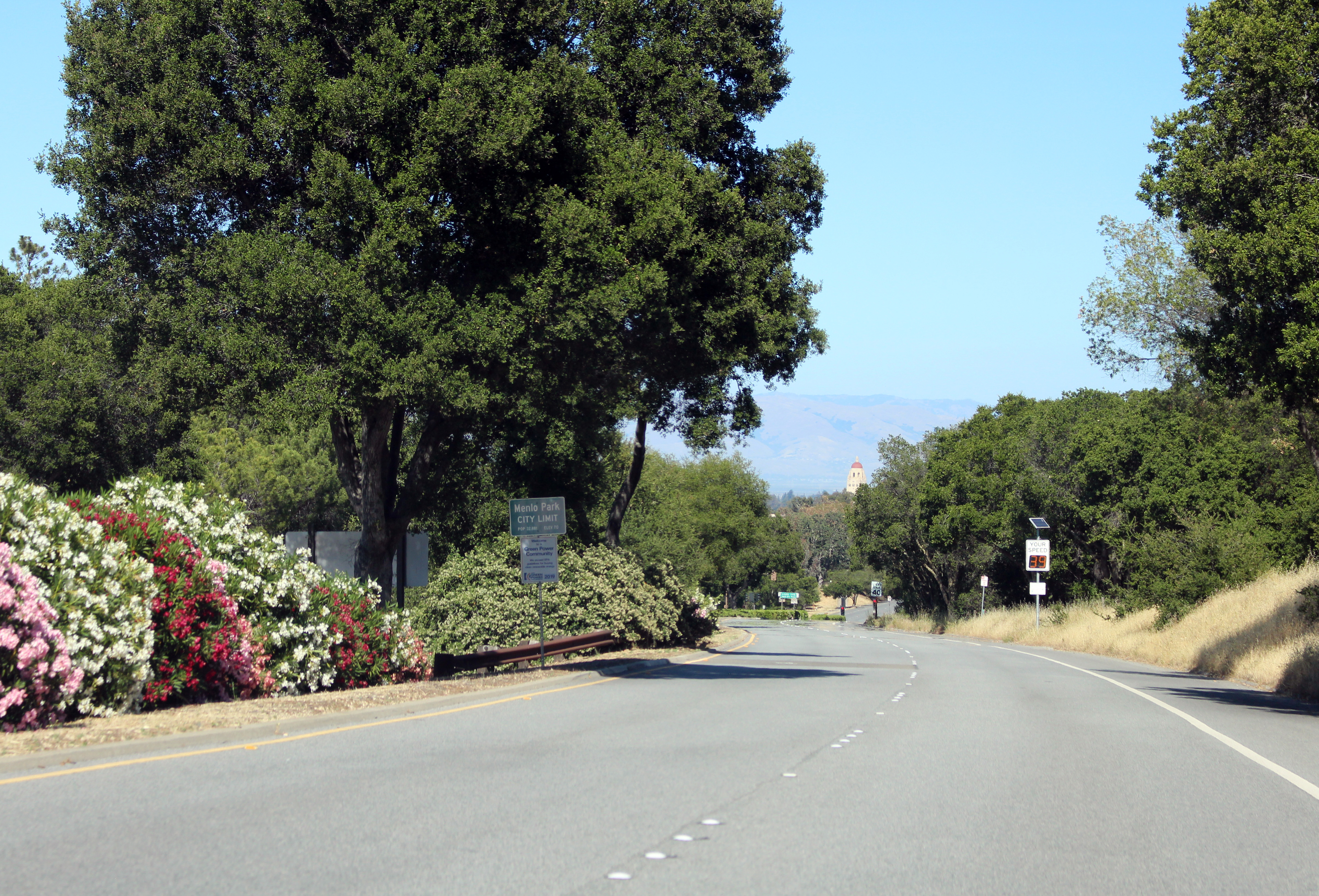
- View of Sand Hill Road, with the Hoover Tower at Stanford University visible in the distance
- Interactive map of Sand Hill Road
- Location: Menlo Park, California; Palo Alto, California; Woodside, California
- Coordinates: 37.42082°N 122.20808°W
- West end: Portola Road in Woodside
- Major junctions: I-280
- East end: SR 82 (El Camino Real) in Palo Alto

Other
- Known for: Silicon Valley; Venture capitalism

Sand Hill Road (SHR) or Sand Hill is an arterial road in western Silicon Valley, California, running through Palo Alto, Menlo Park, and Woodside, notable for its concentration of venture capital firms. The road has become a metonym for that industry; nearly every top Silicon Valley company has been the beneficiary of early funding from firms on Sand Hill Road.

Its significance as a symbol of private equity and venture capitalism in the United States has been compared to that of Wall Street and the stock market.

== Location ==
Connecting El Camino Real and Interstate 280, the road provides easy access to Stanford University and the northwestern area of Silicon Valley. The road also runs southwest of Interstate 280 into a residential neighborhood of Woodside, California, but the private equity companies are concentrated to the east of the freeway on the main stretch of the road in Menlo Park. On its northeast end, it crosses into and runs briefly through Palo Alto before ending at El Camino Real.

Sand Hill Road is also home to SLAC National Accelerator Laboratory.

== History ==
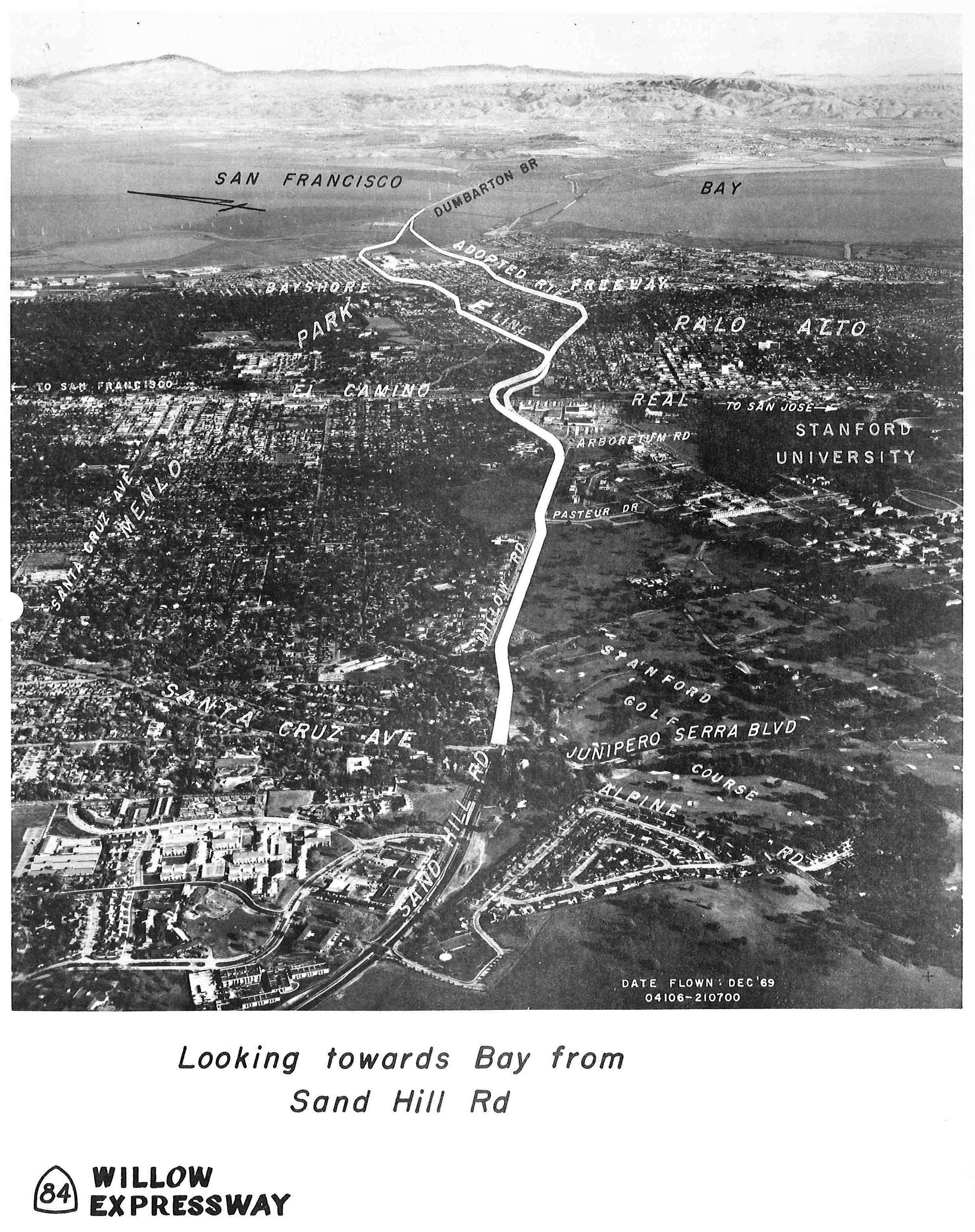
Photograph of Sand Hill Road in December 1969, in the non-approved "Willow Expressway" proposal, which would have extended Sand Hill to connect Interstate 280 to the Dumbarton Bridge

For many years, Sand Hill Road's northern end terminated in the middle of Stanford Shopping Center's parking lot, and the only four-lane segment was the section from Interstate 280 to Santa Cruz Avenue (the section where all the venture capitalists are housed). This situation resulted in two severe bottlenecks which made it difficult to travel to and from Stanford Shopping Center, Stanford University, and Menlo Park.

Extension and widening of the road were fiercely opposed by environmentalists, who were concerned about the road's proximity to San Francisquito Creek, and by residents of Menlo Park, who feared that completion of the road would increase traffic congestion in their area due to the mid-Peninsula region's lack of a direct north–south arterial. After three decades of lobbying, negotiation, and litigation, the road was finally completed to El Camino Real in 2001. Only the existing portion from just north of Alameda de las Pulgas to just south of Stanford Shopping Center was widened to four lanes; the new extension past the shopping center was built only as two lanes.

The bottleneck near Santa Cruz Avenue was widened in 2006 and features a 16-foot (4.9 m) high faux rock wall at the junction of Sand Hill Road and Santa Cruz Avenue. The project was delayed because the stretch of land at issue runs through Menlo Park, not Palo Alto; the city reversed its opposition to widening only after seeing the results of the widening of the northern Palo Alto segment.

== Venture capital ==
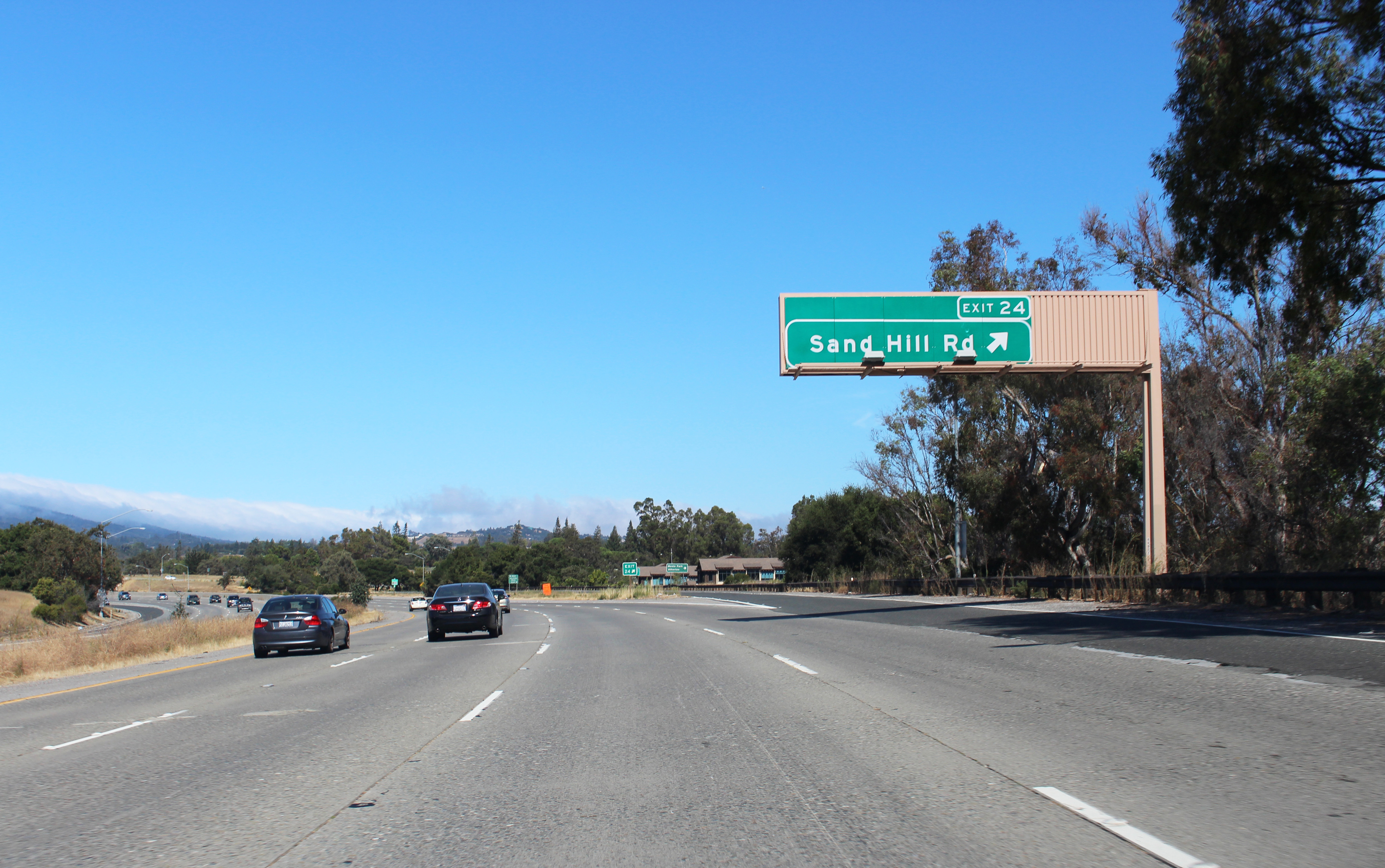
Sand Hill Road exit signage as seen by northbound traffic on Interstate 280

In 1972, the firm now known as Kleiner Perkins was the first venture capital firm to open an office on Sand Hill Road. The stellar performance of Kleiner Perkins's first $8 million fund quickly attracted other similar firms to the Menlo Park area, resulting in "the most important cluster of venture capital firms in the world", an author later wrote. Despite this, in the mid-1970s, Kleiner Perkins began to shift operations to Downtown San Francisco, but years later moved back most of its operations to rejoin the many other venture capital firms that had put down roots around its original office location. Since then, beneficiaries of funding from Sand Hill Road have included Microsoft, Amazon.com, Facebook, Twitter, Instagram and Skype.

When Microsoft's Silicon Valley office moved to Sand Hill Road in 1988 it paid US$2.02 per square foot, less than the US$3 average for Palo Alto and Menlo Park. Robert Gaskins wrote, "There could not be a better location for accessibility coupled with privacy and natural beauty", and "appropriate for a top-tier company like Microsoft". For several years during the dot-com boom of the late 1990s, commercial real estate on Sand Hill Road was more expensive than almost anywhere else in the world. The annual rent in the area around Sand Hill Road peaked at around US$144 per square foot ($1550 per m^{2}) in mid-2000; at the time, this was higher than rates in Manhattan and London's West End.

In 1997, the Harvard Business School opened the California Research Center at 3000 Sand Hill Road, whose aim is to enable HBS faculty to write business cases about Silicon Valley.

As of December 2014, Sand Hill Road still had the most expensive office space in the United States with annual rent reported at $111 per square foot, which was higher than Manhattan's Fifth Avenue at $102 per square foot.

As of June 2022, Sand Hill Road was still home to the most expensive office space in the United States, with Newmark Group reporting monthly rent at $10.66 per square foot (equivalent to annual rent of $127.92 per square foot), which was reportedly higher than other top-tier markets like Manhattan's Park Avenue and Greenwich, Connecticut. However, prices were under pressure from the shift to remote work during the COVID-19 pandemic, which had reduced the necessity of maintaining a physical headquarters on Sand Hill Road. Other issues included the dated appearance of Sand Hill Road's 1.2 million square feet (110,000 m^{2}) of "low-rise woody walk-ups, most of them built in the 1970s and ’80s", and their distance from the restaurants and stores of downtown Menlo Park and its Caltrain station. After vacancies on Sand Hill Road peaked at around 15 percent at the end of 2020, landlords responded to these issues by renovating buildings and adding amenities like farm-to-table restaurants to justify their demands for high rent.

=== Venture Capital and Private Equity Firms ===
Venture capital and private equity firms located on Sand Hill Road include:

- Khosla Ventures, 2128 Sand Hill Road
- GI Partners, 2180 Sand Hill Road
- Merus Capital, 2180 Sand Hill Road
- Accel-KKR, 2180 Sand Hill Road
- Third Point, 2180 Sand Hill Road
- 5AM Ventures, 2200 Sand Hill Road
- Lightspeed Venture Partners, 2200 Sand Hill Road
- The Westly Group, 2200 Sand Hill Road
- Nexus Venture Partners, 2200 Sand Hill Road
- Greylock Partners, 2250 Sand Hill Road
- Onset Ventures, 2400 Sand Hill Road
- Altimeter Capital, 2420 Sand Hill Road
- Highland Capital Partners, 2420 Sand Hill Road, Suite 300
- DCM Ventures, 2420 Sand Hill Road
- Shasta Ventures, 2440 Sand Hill Road
- Storm Ventures, 2440 Sand Hill Road
- Felicis Ventures, 2460 Sand Hill Road
- Mayfield Fund, 2484 Sand Hill Road
- GGV Capital, 2494 Sand Hill Road
- Blackstone, 2494 Sand Hill Road
- Morgenthaler, 2710 Sand Hill Road
- InterWest Partners, 2710 Sand Hill Road
- U.S. Venture Partners, 2735 Sand Hill Road
- Kleiner Perkins, 2750 Sand Hill Road
- TriplePoint Capital, 2755 Sand Hill Road
- Makena Capital Management, 2755 Sand Hill Road
- Silver Lake Partners, 2775 Sand Hill Road
- Oak Hill Capital, 2775 Sand Hill Road, Suite 220
- Canaan Partners, 2765 Sand Hill Road
- KKR, 2800 Sand Hill Road
- New Enterprise Associates, 2855 Sand Hill Road
- Northern Light Venture Capital, 2855 Sand Hill Road
- Andreessen Horowitz, 2865 Sand Hill Road
- Astellas Venture Management, 2882 Sand Hill Road
- Altos Ventures, 2882 Sand Hill Road
- Charles River Ventures, 2882 Sand Hill Road
- Draper Fisher Jurvetson, 2882 Sand Hill Road
- Battery Ventures, 2884 Sand Hill Road
- Menlo Ventures, 2884 Sand Hill Road
- Sofinnova Ventures, 3000 Sand Hill Road
- Institutional Venture Partners, 3000 Sand Hill Road
- Mohr Davidow Ventures, 3000 Sand Hill Road
- Storm Ventures- 3000 Sand Hill Road, Building 4, Suite 210
- Redpoint Ventures, 3000 Sand Hill Road
- Relay Ventures, 3000 Sand Hill Road
- Sequoia Capital, 3000 Sand Hill Road
- Trinity Ventures, 3000 Sand Hill Road, Building 4, Suite 160
- Columbus Nova, 3000 Sand Hill Road, Building 3, Suite 190
- Bright Capital, 3000 Sand Hill Road, Building 2

== In popular culture ==
The season two premiere episode of the HBO television series Silicon Valley, in which the show's protagonists try to secure venture capital for their startup, was titled "Sand Hill Shuffle".

In the second episode of Hulu miniseries The Dropout, Elizabeth Holmes visits several venture capital firms on Sand Hill Road in the hopes of securing investment for Theranos.

In the 2010 film Birdemic: Shock and Terror, protagonist Rod visits a VC firm on Sand Hill Road to get financing for his solar energy startup.
