= Sofinnova Investments =

American healthcare venture capital firm

- Type: Private
- Industry: Venture capital
- Founded: 1976 (U.S.)
- Founders: Jean Deléage (U.S. operations); Alain Azan
- Headquarters: Menlo Park, California, United States
- Key people: Jim Healy, Managing Partner; Maha Katabi, General Partner; Eric Delbridge, General Partner
- AUM: US$4.4 billion (2025)
- Website: www.sofinnova.com

Sofinnova Investments is an American investment firm headquartered in Menlo Park, California, with offices in Boston and New York City. It invests in private and public equity across the life sciences industry. As of 2025 it reported approximately US$4.4 billion in assets under management and committed capital.

== History ==
Sofinnova Investments traces its origins to France, where Sofinnova S.A. was founded in Paris in 1972. In 1976 the firm established a United States presence in San Francisco, California, led by Jean Deléage. Deléage was an early investor in Genentech, reportedly writing a US$50,000 cheque to the company in 1977.

In 1997, the global Sofinnova organization was restructured into two independent management companies: the United States firm, then known as Sofinnova Ventures, and the Paris-based Sofinnova Partners. The two firms have been independent since the split.

From the mid-2000s the firm concentrated on biopharmaceutical investing: its seventh fund (2006) was primarily focused on therapeutics, and by its eighth fund (2011) it invested exclusively in the sector.

In 2017, the firm launched an all-cap, value-oriented, long/short public-equity strategy in global therapeutics. The vehicle, Sofinnova BioEquities, expanded the firm's ability to invest across the public markets while remaining focused on the healthcare and biopharmaceutical sectors and is led by general partner Eric Delbridge.

In 2019, the firm changed its name from Sofinnova Ventures to Sofinnova Investments; the change is recorded in its filings with the U.S. Securities and Exchange Commission between November 2018 and February 2019. The new name aligned the organization's brand with its broader platform spanning private and public healthcare investing.

The firm's eleventh venture fund closed at US$500 million in 2023. A twelfth fund, targeting US$550 million, began raising in 2024.
