= Financial sponsor =

Private equity investment firm

A financial sponsor is a private equity investment firm, particularly a private equity firm that engages in leveraged buyout transactions.

== Sponsors and management ==
In addition to bringing capital to a deal, financial sponsors are expected to bring a combination of capital markets expertise, various important contacts, strategies for operational improvement, and the experience of owning leveraged companies. As the owners of the company, financial sponsors rarely manage a company directly and are most active in issues relating to the company's capital structure and balance sheet as well as strategic initiatives including mergers and acquisitions, joint ventures, and management restructurings. The company's CEO and other senior management maintain responsibility for day-to-day operational issues.

== Sponsors and other investors ==
Various investor classes look to the financial sponsor to generate value in a company as much as the management or operations of the company. In particular, debt providers are willing to extend credit in the form of bank loans, high-yield debt and mezzanine capital based in part on the reputation of and relationship with the financial sponsor.

Additionally, many companies owned by financial sponsors will raise equity in the public markets through an initial public offering (IPO) as a means of exiting an investment. Public investors will seek to align their own interests as much as possible with those of the financial sponsor by limiting the financial sponsor's ability to sell shares and managing the use of proceeds from the offering. Various studies have been conducted to evaluate the impact of financial sponsor ownership on the performance of IPOs.

== See also ==
- Private equity
- Private-equity firm
- Leveraged buyout
