= Taxation of private equity and hedge funds =

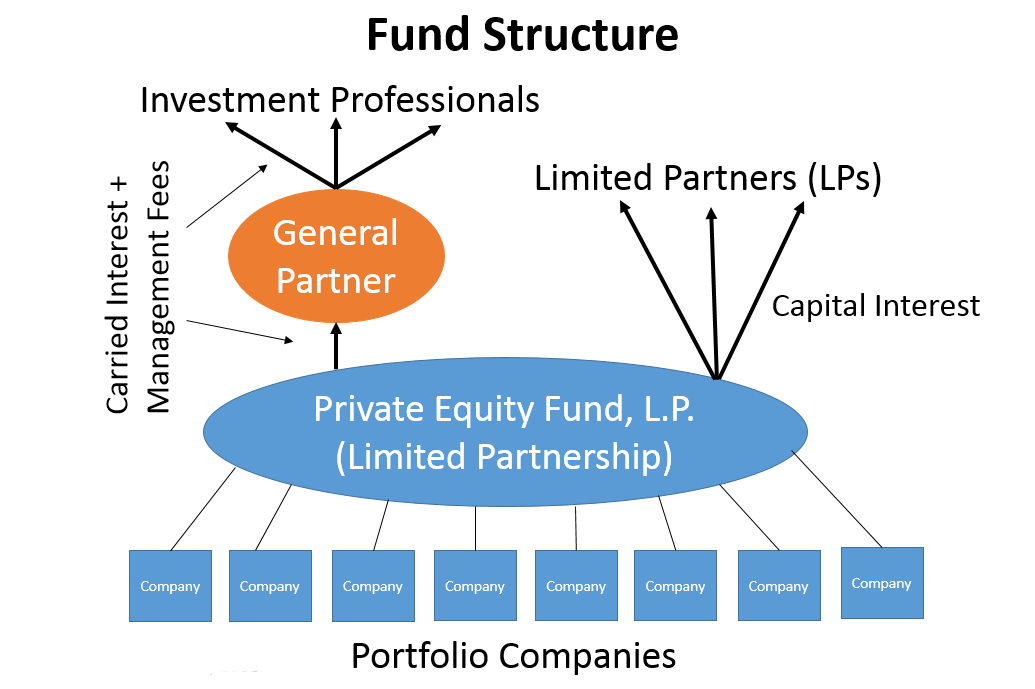
Structure of a private equity or hedge fund, which shows the carried interest and management fee received by the fund's investment managers. The general partner is the financial entity used to control and manage the fund, while the limited partners are the individual investors who receive their return as capital interest.

Private equity funds and hedge funds are private investment vehicles used to pool investment capital, usually for a small group of large institutional or wealthy individual investors. They are subject to favorable regulatory treatment in most jurisdictions from which they are managed, which allows them to engage in financial activities that are off-limits for more regulated companies. Both types of fund also take advantage of generally applicable rules in their jurisdictions to minimize the tax burden on their investors, as well as on the fund managers. As media coverage increases regarding the growing influence of hedge funds and private equity, these tax rules are increasingly under scrutiny by legislative bodies. Private equity and hedge funds choose their structure depending on the individual circumstances of the investors the fund is designed to attract.

== Basic structure: U.S. domestic fund ==
A private equity or hedge fund located in the United States will typically be structured as a limited partnership, due to the lack of an entity-level tax on partnerships and other flow-through entities under the U.S. tax system. The limited partners will be the institutional and individual investors. The general partner will be an affiliate of the manager of the fund. Typically, the manager of the hedge fund is compensated with a fee based on 2% of the gross assets of the fund, and a profits interest entitling the manager (or, more typically, its affiliated general partner) to 20% of the fund's return (subject, in many cases, to minimum guaranteed returns for the limited partners).

== Carried interest ==
Because the manager is compensated with a profits interest in the fund, the bulk of its income from the fund is taxed, not as compensation for services, but as a return on investment. Typically, when a partner receives a profits interest (commonly referred to as a "carried interest"), the partner is not taxed upon receipt, due to the difficulty of ascertaining the present value of an interest in future profits. Instead, the partner is taxed as the partnership earns income. In the case of a hedge fund, this means that the partner defers taxation on the income that the hedge fund earns, which is typically ordinary income (or possibly short-term capital gains), due to the nature of the investments most hedge funds make. Private equity funds, however, typically invest on a longer horizon, with the result that income earned by the funds is long-term capital gain, taxable to individuals at a maximum 20% rate. Because the 20% profits share typically is the bulk of the manager's compensation, and because this compensation can reach, in the case of the most successful funds, enormous figures, concern has been raised, both in Congress and in the media, that managers are taking advantage of tax loopholes to receive what is effectively a salary without paying the ordinary 39.6% marginal income tax rates that an average person would have to pay on such income. To address this concern, Congressman Sander M. Levin introduced H.R. 2834, which would eliminate the ability of persons performing investment adviser or similar services to partnerships to receive capital gains tax treatment on their income. However, the Treasury Department has suggested, both in testimony before the Senate Finance Committee and in public speaking engagements, that altering the tax treatment of a single industry raises tax policy concerns, and that changing the way partnerships in general are taxed is something that should only be done after careful consideration of the potential impact.

Congressman Charles B. Rangel included a revised version of H.R. 2834 as part of the "Mother of All Tax Reform" and the 2007 House extenders package. A line item on taxing carried interest at ordinary income rates was included in the Obama Administration's 2008 Budget Blueprint. On April 2, 2009, Congressman Levin introduced a new and substantially revised version of the carried interest legislation as H.R. 1935. On May 28, 2010, the House approved carried interest legislation as part of amendments to the Senate-passed version of H.R. 4213. On February 14, 2012, Congressman Levin introduced H.R. 4016.

== Publicly traded partnerships ==
In mid-2007, the Blackstone group, a major private equity fund, went public. Ordinarily, a publicly traded partnership is taxed as a corporation. There is, however, an exception for publicly traded partnerships earning only “passive-type” income, such as interest and dividends. Although the investments made by a private equity fund are actively managed, Blackstone took the position that the investments they engaged in fell squarely within literal language of this exception to the usual treatment for publicly traded partnerships. To address what they viewed as a loophole in the law, Senators Baucus and Grassley introduced S. 1624, which would remove the ability for publicly traded partnerships performing asset-management and related services to avoid being taxed as corporations. The result of this bill would be to change the tax treatment of private equity and hedge funds from a single level of taxation at a 15% rate (or 35% in the case of most hedge funds) to a corporate-level tax of 35%, plus a 15% tax on dividends when distributed. While acknowledging that there are concerns with the current treatment of publicly traded partnerships, Treasury Secretary Paulson has declined to endorse the treatment that would be provided under S. 1624.

The House extenders package included a carried interest provision that would apply to publicly traded partnerships beginning in tax years after 31 December 2009.

Various private equity and hedge fund managers followed Fortress, the first fund manager to go public as a PTP. The funds include Oaktree, Blackstone Group, Och-Ziff, KKR, Apollo Global Management, and Carlyle Group.

== "Blocker" corporations ==
Although a partnership structure is advantageous for most investors due to the elimination of an entity-level tax, it is not the desired form for all investors. In particular, foreign investors and domestic tax-exempt organizations both have reasons to prefer to interpose a corporation in the private equity or hedge fund structure.

Foreign investors are generally not required to file tax returns unless they have “effectively connected income,” derived from the active conduct of a U.S. trade or business. Passive investment in a corporation does not give rise to a U.S. trade or business. However, active investment management of the type performed by private equity funds or hedge funds typically does. Because partners in a partnership are treated as engaged in whatever business the partnership itself is engaged in, this means that if a foreign investor invests in a hedge fund or private equity fund, it will generally be forced to file a U.S. tax return. To avoid this requirement, a foreign investor will often invest through a blocker corporation (usually located in the Cayman Islands or another offshore jurisdiction). The corporation itself will be required to file U.S. tax returns, and will pay taxes at the normal U.S. corporate tax rate, but the foreign investor will receive only dividends or capital gains from the blocker, and will therefore not be required to file a U.S. return. As an alternative to the “blocker” structure, hedge funds seeking to attract foreign investors can also structure as partnerships, but simply restrict themselves to activities that are not treated as a U.S. trade or business. For example, U.S. tax law provides that trading in securities for the taxpayer's own account will not constitute a U.S. trade or business. Thus foreign hedge funds formed as corporations do not generally pay corporate income tax.

Domestic tax-exempt entities face similar concerns when investing in funds structured as partnerships. While tax-exempt on income related to their tax-exempt purpose, tax exempt entities are required to file tax returns and pay income tax on “unrelated business taxable income,” commonly referred to as UBTI. Because the activities of an entity structured as a partnership flow through to its investors, if the partnership receives income that would be UBTI in the hands of the tax-exempt investor, the investor is forced to file an income-tax return and pay unrelated business income tax. To avoid this requirement, tax exempt entities use offshore blocker corporations in much the same way foreign investors do. To date, no bill has been introduced to change this treatment, although concerns over the tax gap have led to increased scrutiny of business structures involving offshore corporations in general. For example, in May 2007, the Senate Finance Committee held a hearing about offshore structures used for tax evasion.
