= Apache Tejo =

Coordinates: 32°38′46.08″N 108°07′41.1″W

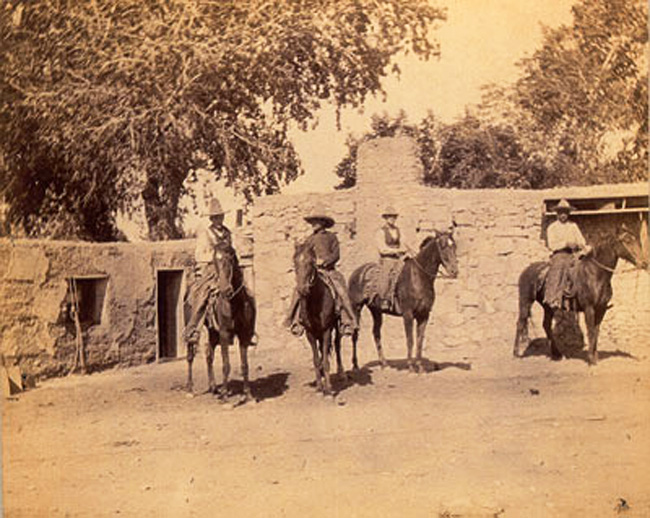
Apache Tejo, 1894

Apache Tejo (sometimes 'Tejoe' or 'Teju') was a White settlement and watering stop in the New Mexico Territory, 12 miles southeast of Silver City, 3 miles south of Hurley, and 2 miles east of the Grant County Airport. It is just off U.S. Route 180, about 12 miles west of the mail route crossing of the Mimbres River and on the old Santa Rita-Janos (Chihuahua) trail. There was a railroad siding here once.

The etymology of the name is unclear. It may have been derived from the name of a Chihenne leader of the 1770s, Pachiteju, but other accounts called it Apache de Ho(o), which might mean 'Apache water'.

The U.S. Army's Fort McLane was established here in 1860, on the bank of a small spring. The commander reported that it had sufficient "water, timber, and grazing" to support the fort. It was originally named Fort Floyd, after Secretary of War John B. Floyd. After Floyd joined the Confederacy, it was renamed to honor a Captain George McLane, who had been killed by Navajos. It was finally abandoned in 1864.

In the context of the Apache Wars, the Apache chief Mangas Coloradas held a council here with the white settlers in about 1863, where the Apache were promised provisions in return for peace, according to Geronimo. Mangas Coloradas and his people duly arrived and were "foully murdered after he surrendered".

In 1877, Billy the Kid joined a group of "thieves and rustlers" known as the Boys here.

[Dean Duke] did and said many things which reminded me of the Virginian

— Owen Wister, author of The Virginian

Owen Wister, "father of western fiction", visited the Apache Tejo ranch in 1895. He described it as "a little oasis of hay field, cottonwoods, a spring, and some flowers and grass in front of the adobe house". The foreman of the ranch, Dean Duke, was one of the inspirations for the protagonist of Wister's The Virginian.

The Apache Tejo Hot Springs, with water issuing at 94 °F, were used as a water source by the Chino Copper company for the Chino mine; the company built a pumping station and a wooden pipeline to Hurley. The spring no longer flows. As of 1916, this water was also used as the domestic water supply of Hurley. The large tailings pond of the mine lies 1 mile to the southeast.
