= Freeport-McMoRan =

American mining company

Freeport-McMoRan Inc.
- Type: Public
- Traded as: NYSE: FCX; S&P 500 component
- Industry: Metals and Mining
- Founded: 1912; 114 years ago
- Founder: Eric Pierson Swenson, et al
- Headquarters: Freeport-McMoRan Center, Phoenix, Arizona, U.S.
- Area served: Worldwide
- Key people: Richard Adkerson; (Chairman); Kathleen L. Quirk; (President & CEO)
- Products: Copper; Gold; Molybdenum
- Revenue: ▲US$25.9 billion (2025)
- Net income: ▼US$4.15 billion (2025)
- Number of employees: 28,500 (2024)
- Subsidiaries: Atlantic Copper, S.A.; PT Freeport Indonesia (49%); PT Irja Eastern Minerals
- Website: fcx.com

Freeport-McMoRan Inc., often called Freeport, is an American mining company based in the Freeport-McMoRan Center, in Phoenix, Arizona. The company is the world's largest producer of molybdenum, a major copper producer and operates the world's largest gold mine, the Grasberg mine in Papua, Indonesia.

It was founded 1912 by the son of a Swedish banker to develop sulfur mining along the U.S. Gulf Coast concurrently with Freeport, Texas. In 1913, it incorporated as a vertically integrated holding company including numerous subsidiaries like gas and light, railroad, oil from Tampico, Mexico, and a refinery. After 1930, the company diversified by buying into manganese mines, nickel during World War II, potash and the Cuban American Manganese Corporationin the 1950s. Since 1967, the company has mined the Ertsberg deposit of gold and copper in the Grasberg mine, where since 2017 it has been holding a 49% interest. In the 1990s the Rio Tinto Group invested in Freeport and IMC Group acquired its fertilizer business.

The multinational company which owns subsidiaries in the Americas, Europe, Asia, Africa has caused extensive, long-term and irreversible environmental damage in areas, where it has operated. It has been criticized for violating human rights in Papua. In 2018, Freeport-McMoRan Copper & Gold along with 90 additional Fortune 500 companies paid no federal taxes as a result of the Tax Cuts and Jobs Act of 2017.

In July 2026, Freeport-McMoRan projected long-term growth driven by a forecasted 50% increase in global copper demand by 2040, supporting electric vehicle and clean energy technologies.

== History ==
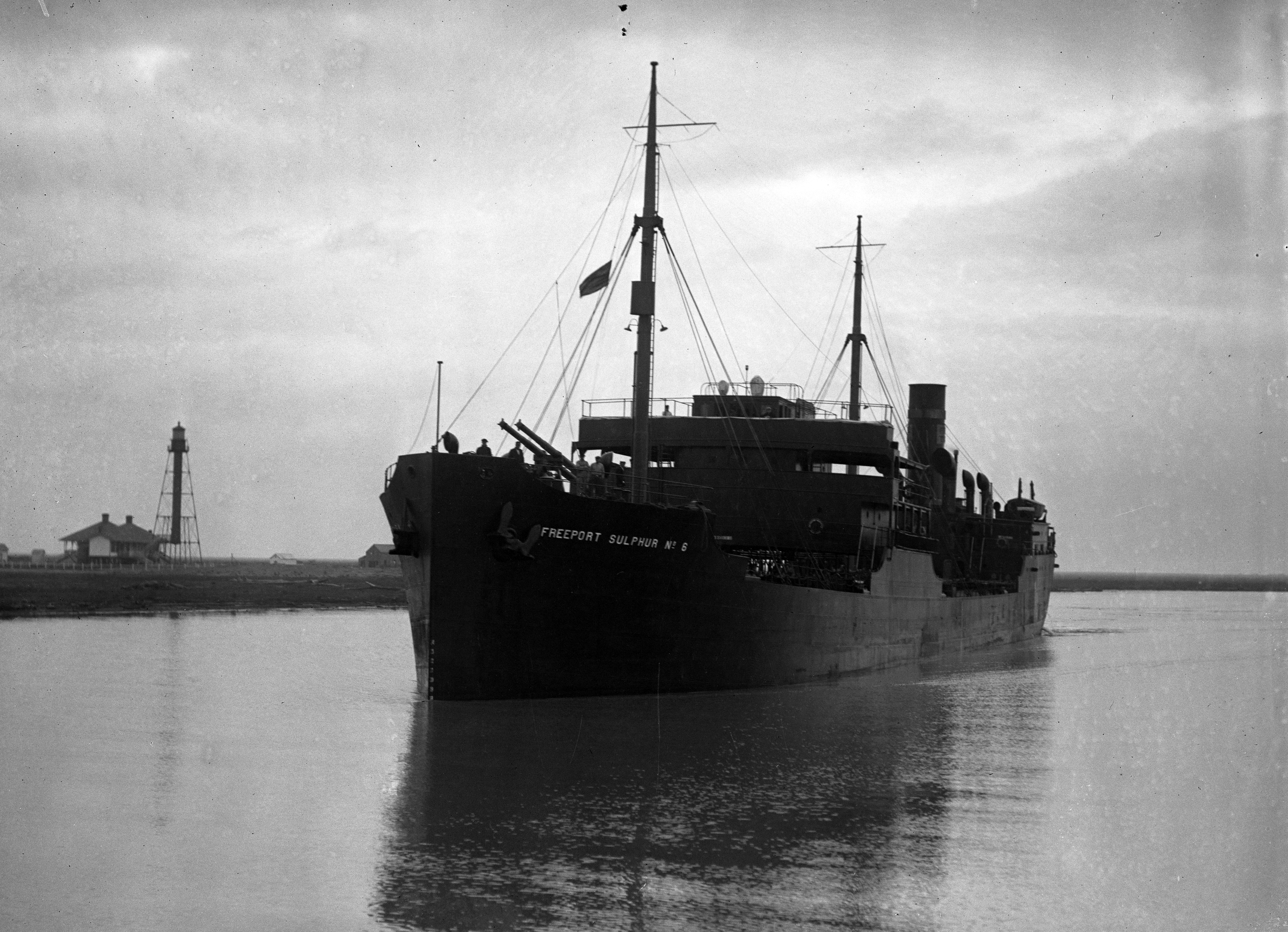
Freeport Sulphur No.6 entering Freeport, Texas, harbor, 1923

The Freeport Sulphur Company was founded July 12, 1912, by the eldest son of Swante M. Swenson, banker Eric Pierson Swenson, with a group of investors, to develop sulfur mining at Bryan Mound salt dome, along the U.S. Gulf Coast. Freeport, Texas was also established in Nov. 1912 to house workers, and serve as a port for Houston, rivaling Galveston and Corpus Christi.

Freeport mined sulfur along the Gulf Coast using the Frasch process, the patents for which had expired in 1908, a disruptive innovation for the automated mining of previously inaccessible sulphur deposits at a cost lower than that of established mines, where manual labor gained the mineral under the most appalling conditions. Previously, Union Sulphur Company founder and patent-holder Herman Frasch had enjoyed a monopoly on the process. The Bryan Mound salt dome just south of Freeport became the second Frasch sulphur mine in the world in 1912.

=== Freeport Texas Company ===
Sulphur production
Year	Long Tons	% U.S.
1914	41,872	10
1915	136,751	26
1916	261,779	40
1917	537,248	47
1918	420,484	31
1919	314,845	26
1920	280,736	22
(Note: Partial operation only - to reduce stockpiles)1921	55,835	3
1922	161,446	9
1923	581,574	29
1924	197,970	16
1925	409,070	29
1926	584,220	31
1927	790,315	37
1928	907,970	46
1929	910,470	39
1930	782,580	

Enterprise to support Freeport Sulphur's business and the new town's infrastructure led to the incorporation of a holding company on September 30, 1913, to join the newer assets with Freeport Sulphur and create a vertically integrated mining company around, at first, a single sulphur mine. Officers of the new holding company, Freeport Texas Company, were:

- Eric. P. Swenson, President and Director (Freeport Sulphur founder, son of Swante M. Swenson)
- Edward E. Dickinson, vice-president and Director
- F.M. Altz, Secretary
- Swante M. Swenson, Treasurer (son of Eric P. Swenson)
- Charles H. Findlay, Auditor (son of Hugh Findlay and his third wife, Mary Ellen Smith)
- Directors
  - Eric P. Swenson
  - Edward E. Dickinson
  - Richard H. Williams (son of Richard H. Williams)
  - Harry K. Knapp
  - Samuel McRoberts
  - Charles P. Northrop
  - Charles A. Stone
  - Frank A. Vanderlip
  - Sidell Tilghman (son of General Lloyd Tilghman)
  - Eppa Hunton Jr. (son of late Virginia Senator, Brig. Gen. Eppa Hunton)
  - Charles E. Herrmann

Shares of Freeport Texas Co. issued at par ($100) for cash
Date	Issued	Total raised
Incorp.	10,440	$1,044,000
Oct. 15, 1913	4,560	$1,500,000
Apr. 23, 1914	5,000	$2,000,000
Oct. 5, 1916	15,000	$3,500,000

On May 7, 1917, all 35,000 outstanding shares were exchanged for 500,000 new shares of no par value (at a rate of 14 2/7:1). The stock was listed on the NYSE since 1919. Freeport raised an additional $4 million with an April 1, 1922 issue of convertible bonds, almost all of which were converted to common stock right away. Of the new total of 732,000 authorized shares 729,844 were then outstanding. (Note: Freeport raised additional cash from investors during April 1922, giving each shareholder the right to subscribe to $8 of a bond issue for each share they held. The $4 million 7% 15-year bonds dated Apr. 1, 1922, were issued on occasion of the signing of the Hoskins Mound contract with Texaco and the resumption of operations at Bryan Mound after a year of pause and were convertible to common stock at any time, 29 shares for each $500 of the bonds with the exchange ratio decreasing per quarter to a final 17 shares per $500 after May 1, 1923. On Dec 31, 1924 729,844 of the 732,000 authorized shares were outstanding, almost the entire bond issue was subscribed to and converted at the high ratio. Freeport had thus raised almost $4 million at a little over $17 per share.) In 1933, the no par common stock was exchanged for $10 par common and $2,500,000 convertible preferred were issued to finance the development of Grande Ecaille, about half of which was converted, the remainder called for redemption in 1938 at the end of which 796,380 common shares were outstanding. (Note: In February, 1933, 25,000 shares of par $100 convertible (Note: each preferred share convertible to 3 1/3 common shares on or before Feb. 1, 1938 and 2.5 common shares thereafter and on or before Feb. 1, 1945) preferred stock were issued to finance the development of Grande Ecaille. The 729,844 no par shares with a book value of $10.0336 were exchanged for an equal amount of par $10 common shares (the difference added to surplus) and the authorized capital was increased by (1) 83,334 shares to provide headroom for the conversion of the preferred and (2) authority to issue 36,822 shares (Note: 36,822 includes the 732,000-729,844 that were previously unissued) for other purposes subject to Board approval, resulting in a new total of 850,000 authorized par $10 shares. In 1933 54,747 common shares were issued as a result of conversion. The company used cash to redeem on March 15, 1938 all 12,301 remaining 6% convertible preferred shares (on Dec 31, 1938 there were 796,380 common shares outstanding). In June 1933, sharp increases in demand for sulphur and the price of manganese propelled the stock upwards and conversion was soon profitable. Dividends in the beginning were also higher for the common stock (and the common traded at a premium), but whoever held on to the preferred received more dividends in later years (and the preferred traded at a premium) and this balancing act was probably the reason why some converted and some did not. Holding on to the preferred of course was also an insurance against the common again dropping below conversion profitability.) To raise general working capital Freeport Sulphur in 1939 sold $3,000,000 in 3% 20-year private debentures to Metropolitan Life Insurance Co. and Sun Life Insurance Co. of Canada. On September 1, 1951, the 99th consecutive quarterly dividend was paid. Effective September 21, 1951 the 800,000 outstanding common shares were split 3-for-1 and the authorized capital was increased from 850,000 to 3,000,000 shares. On March 2, 1959, the 129th consecutive quarterly dividend was paid and effective May 5, 1959 the 2,504,850 outstanding shares were once again split 3-for-1 and the authorized capital was increased from 3,000,000 to 10,000,000 shares.

Freeport Sulphur was on the Fortune 500 in 1955, 1956, 1957, 1967, 1968, 1969, 1970.

Freeport common stock price range and dividend payments (Note: Not included are any extra dividends)
1920s (Note: Share price: 0 1 2 3 4 5 6 7 8 9 Dividends: 7; 8; 9)
	0	1	2	3	4	5	6	7	8	9
High	36 1/2	20 1/2	27 1/4	22	13 7/8	24 7/8	36	106 1/2	109 1/4	54 7/8
Low	12 1/8	9 1/2	12 1/4	9 1/2	7 1/2	8	19 5/8	34 1/4	43	23 3/4
Div.	0							$3.5	$4	$4
1930s (Note: Share price: 0 1 2 3 4 5 6 7 8 9 Preferred Price: 3 4 5 6 7 Dividends: 0; 1; 2; 3; 4; 5; 6; 7; 8; 9)
	0	1	2	3	4	5	6	7	8	9
High	55 1/2	43 1/4	28 5/8	49 3/8	50 3/8	30 5/8	35 5/8	32 1/4	32	36
Low	24 1/2	13 1/4	10	16 1/8	21 1/2	17 1/4	23 1/2	18	19 7/8	18 1/4
Div.	$4	$3.25	$2	$2	$2	$1	$1	$1.5	$2	$1
pfd High				160 1/8	160 1/8	125	135	117		
pfd Low				97	113 1/2	112 1/2	108	102		
1940s (Note: Share price: 0 1 2 3 4 5 6 7 8 9 Dividends: 0; 1; 2; 3; 4; 5; 6; 7; 8; 9)
	0	1	2	3	4	5	6	7	8	9
High	39 1/4	41	38 3/4	38 1/4	36 3/8	51 1/2	61	50 1/8	47 5/8	60
Low	24 3/3	32 1/2	27	29 3/4	30 1/2	34	45 1/2	36 1/2	35 3/4	38
Div.	$1	$2	$2	$2	$2	$2.125	$2.5	$2.5	$2.625	$4
1950s (Note: Share price: 0 1 2 3 4 5 6 7 8 9 Dividends: 0; 1; 2; 3; 4; 5; 6; 7; 8; 9)
	0	1	2	3	4	5	6	7	8	9
High	81	(Note: Before split: 130 1/4, after: 49 3/8)	46	51 3/4	76 1/2	98 3/4	97 1/4	123	107 1/2	(Note: Before split: 112, after: 37 3/8)
Low	56	(Note: Before split: 78, after: 35 3/8)	35 3/4	39 1/4	45 1/2	68	78	68 1/2	67 1/4	(Note: Before split: 97, after: 23 3/4)
Div.	$5	(Note: Before split: $1.25+$1.25+$1.50, after: 50c)	$2	$2	$2.5	$2.625	$3	$3	$3	(Note: Before split: 90c, after: 30c+30c+30c)

Freeport Texas subsidiaries
Name	Where incorp.	When incorp.	capital
Freeport Sulphur Co.	Texas	Jul 12, 1912	$200,000
Freeport Town Site Company	Texas	Jul 12, 1912	$20,000
Acquired 1,111 acres of real estate. Paved roads and sidewalks, provided water, electric lights and parks and built the Tarpon Inn hotel. By the end of 1918 had sold 550 lots (avg. $385.50 per lot).
Freeport Terminal Company	Texas	Jul 12, 1912	$10,000
In early 1914 a sulphur conveyor to and 3,600 tons per day loading devices at the pier of the Seaboard & Gulf Steamship Co (Note: was organized in 1910, associated with the Houston & Brazos Valley RR, primary business was a steamship line between New York City and Gulf Coast ports. Ships in service were: Honduras (inaugurated the line when she sailed from NY in October 1910); Kennebec (since August 1913, 3,600 tons); Had a contract with Freeport Sulphur for shipping of sulphur to customers.) in the Freeport ship channel were completed. The Seaboard & Gulf steamer Honduras was the first to make use of it and on April 8 was the first outbound heavy cargo to leave the mouth of the Brazos River for nearly 20 years. These 2,000 tons to Baltimore and New York were the second sulphur shipment made by Freeport Sulpher Co. The company was also responsible for new railroad construction to the port facilities. See map: A special engineering feature was a 4.5 mile, 1,500-p.s.i., 8-inch heated pipeline from the dock to the Bryan Mound plant, which enclosed a 2-inch steam line to allow the movement of the heavy and viscous crude oil. The pipe was especially curved to allow for thermal expansion and was the third iteration of attempts to solve the problem, a prior 4-inch and an 8-inch line having been salvaged. In 1924 the properties were transferred to the Freeport Sulphur subsidiary and the Terminal Co. was dissolved. The capacity of the loading dock was for many years not sufficient and a good portion of the sulphur was moved by rail for loading at Texas City. The mouth of the Brazos was diverted (at 28.963°N 95.374°W) in 1929 and Freeport became a proper tidewater port.
Freeport Light, Water & Ice Company	Texas	Oct 26, 1914	$5,000
At the end of 1918, distributed water to 326 and electricity (bought from Freeport Sulphur Co.) to 243 customers. The properties were sold to the Houston Lighting & Power Co. and the company liquidated in 1927. Freeport was connected to Houston Lighting's transmission system and Freeport Sulphur contracted to supply surplus current from its local power plant to Houston Lighting.
Freeport Sulphur Transportation Co	Delaware	Nov 18, 1916	$25,000
Managed the shipping of oil from Mexico to Freeport to satisfy Freeport Sulphur Co.'s demand for 4,000 barrels per day. Mexico was at the time on the upward slope of an oil boom which peaked in 1921 and the world's second largest producer behind the United States from 1918 until 1926. The heavy Panuco field oil was bought from the East Coast Oil Co. at their Torres terminal at Tampico. The company owned several ships: Freeport Sulphur No. 1: 2,588gt (21,000 barrels) tanker, 1,500 hp, 10.5knots, sold during 1927.; Freeport Sulphur No. 2: 488gt steel tug, 1,200 hp, 7.5knots, sold for $47,500 on Apr 3, 1930; Freeport Sulphur No. 3 and 4: identical tank barges, 1,166gt (15,000 barrels), former coal barges bought in 1916 from the Shawmut Steamship Co. for $100k each.; Freeport Sulphur No. 6: 40,000bbl tanker, sold for $270,000 on Dec. 2, 1929; Freeport Sulphur No. 5: not a tanker, but a 4,127 ton (6,600 dwt.) sulphur carrying bulk freighter sold in February 1940 amidst World War II to William Reardon-Smith Ltd, Cardiff.; Freeport had received its first shipment of Mexican oil in February 1914: 9,753 bbl. originating from Tampico on the barge General Pettibone towed by tug Senator Baily. At the end of 1925 the company set plans in motion to convert its plants to use natural gas. The Houston Pipe Line Company completed a 54 mile (Note: 35 miles to Hoskins, 18 miles from Hoskins to Bryan) 16-inch pipe line to supply Bryan and Hoskins Mound in October 1926 and laid more 16-inch pipe in 1930 (or applied asphalt coating to the excavated exiting line). The contract called for delivery of 30mmcfd, as replacement for a consumption of 6,000bpd of oil. This company also served Texas Gulf's Big Hill sulphur mine and many other industrial sites in Texas. See 1927 maps: This changeover saved the company some $2,000 per day on their principal cost contributor. Freeport spent $125,277.20 on boiler conversion and made available $750,000 in short-term loans out of its cash reserve to help finance the pipeline (i.e. paid an advance on their gas bill). Natural gas was regularly flared off at the time as a byproduct of oil production, difficult to transport to consumers far away and therefore very cheap in the oil producing Gulf Coast region.
Freeport Gas Company; Freeport Asphalt Company^{1922}	Texas	Apr 23, 1918	$50,000
completed a refinery at Bryanmound in 1919 to extract gasoline from the company's fuel oil supply. The company changed its name to Freeport Asphalt Co at the end of 1922 at which time it had 300 asphalt tank cars. The 5,000bpd skimming+asphalt refinery at Bryanmound was not in operation after Dec 31, 1927 and in 1930 entirely dismantled and the company was dissolved. Natural gas was now used to power the sulphur mines.
Houston & Brazos Valley Railway Company	Texas	Apr 3, 1907	$24,000
Incorporated as successor to the Velasco, Brazos & Northern Railway (Note: Incorporated in July 1901 as successor to the Velasco Terminal Railway, foreclosed May 7, 1901 and owner of 20 mile road from Chenango junction to Velasco, which was originally laid in 1891 and 1892) and was owner of a 23.6 mile line from Light House to Anchor, Texas (see map:). Owned trackage rights for 5 years from Nov 10, 1912 over 40 miles of International-Great Northern system to Houston and at Angleton the line crossed the St. Louis, Brownsville & Mexico. Had $420,000 30-year 5% bonds dated July 1, 1907 and $24k stock issued out of an authorized $120k. 50% of the stock and $79,000 of the bonds were owned by the Freeport Texas Co., 50% by the Missouri, Kansas & Texas Railway Company of Kansas (since Apr 1913), which also owned $93,000 and guaranteed $210,000 of the bonds. Freeport Sulphur probably bought its interest early in 1913. The extension from Velasco to Bryan Mound was built by this company, including the 500 ft steel+concrete bridge (28.95489°N 95.35415°W) to connect Velasco with Freeport, built at a cost of ca. $120,000 jointly with the county, contracted to Midland Bridge Co. of Kansas City. A structural failure in May 1915 delayed the bridge. The railroad had however already crossed the Brazos river before 1913 by means of a car float. The railroad company went into receivership on October 28, 1915, which lasted till 1924 when it changed hands again. On Dec 31, 1923 there were still $420k bonds and $24k stock outstanding. In 1922 a 13-mile extension was built from Hoskins Junction (Note: When following the remains of the right of way from H. Mound one is led to this point: 29.01049°N 95.38619°W) to Hoskins Mound. The first train to run over the tracks on October 7, 1922, brought construction material to the new plant site. On February 1, 1924, the New Orleans, Texas and Mexico Railway bought all of the stock and assumed all liabilities for a purchase price of $1,600,000. Included were 2.07 miles from Dock Junction to the Freeport Sulphur dock, 3.12 miles industrial tracks on Bryan Mound and 12.56 miles from Hoskins Junction to H. Mound. all of which were transferred to the company and combined into a total of 43.03 miles.
Societe Pour L'Importation at al Vente des Soufres Americains	France	<=1920	Fr2,000,000
Freeport Texas owned 500,000 francs (25%) of the stock. Translates to: Company for the Import and Sale of American Sulphur.
La Espuela Oil Co.	Mexico	Mar 13, 1920	$250,000
In 1919 Freeport Sulphur Co. acquired from the Pan-American Petroleum Co. land in the Panuco field near Tampico, including the 1,500bpd Don Juan No. 1 well discovered in 1915 and ever since shut-in. The East Coast Oil Co. (owner of a pipeline from Panuco to Tampico) received the oil henceforth produced. Espuela Oil shared its official office with the East Coast Oil Company. The company began the delivery of oil in March 1920. Until the end of the year production totaled 562,768 barrels. (Note: Espuela Oil Co. production during 1920 in cubic meters: Jan: 0; Feb: 0; Mar: 2,931.791; Apr: 3,828.040; May: 10,834.086; Jun: 9,583.759; Jul: 9,268.153; Aug: 7,725.141; Sep: 10,867.802; Oct: 11,898.398; Nov: 11,387.027; Dec: 11,148.828; total: 89,473.025 (562,768 barrels)) As of Jan 31, 1921, the company had three productive wells: Robles No. 1 (1,006bpd); Robles No. 2 (1,000bpd); Don Juan No. 1 (2,075bpd); and struck oil flowing at ca. 1,500bpd with Don Juan No. 2 on Jan 20, 1921 and at ca. 5,000bpd with Sobrevilla No. 2 on Feb 22, 1921. Actual production was much lower than potential production. Espuela produced 931,027bbl (2,550bpd) in 1921, ranked #25 out of 50 companies and produced 0.5% of Mexico's total of 194,755,712bbl in the country's most productive year of the period. Production in 1922 was 1,383,498bbl (3,790bpd), #16 out of 88 companies and 0.75% of the total.
Sulphur Export Corp	New York	Dec 29, 1922 (Note: date of public announcement)	$9,380
Freeport Texas owned stock in this company organized under the Webb–Pomerene Act of 1918 as a monopolistic Export Association. Other members were Union Sulphur Company and Texas Gulf Sulphur Company, i.e. essentially the entire U.S. industry. In 1920 a total of 1,517,625 long tons of sulphur valued at $30m was produced in the United States (of which 262,376 long tons were from extensive stockpiles mined in previous years), principally from four mines in Nevada (not a Frasch mine), Louisiana (Union's) and Texas (Bryan Mound and Texas Gulf's Big Hill) and 477,450 long tons valued at $8,994,350 were exported. Other important exporters were Italy, Japan and Chile, their importance on the decline. With the application of the Frasch process the world sulphur market was turned on its head in the first two decades of the 20th century and was now clearly dominated by the United States. Freeport Texas Co. held 50% of the stock in 1930 and the export company sold to 35 countries. In 1952 the company was dissolved and in 1958 a new Sulphur Export Corp, nicknamed Sulexco was formed and now included: 37% Texas Gulf Sulphur Co.; 37% Freeport Sulphur Co.; 18% Jefferson Lake Sulphur Co.; 8% Duval Sulphur and Potash Co.; In 1961 the companies had a combined production capacity of 7 million tons per year from 13 domes, (still) more than the rest of the world combined.
South Texas Stevedore Co.	Texas	Sep 1920	$5,000

In 1919, minority stockholders John R. Williams & Sons, First National Bank of Richmond, Virginia vice-president, W. M. Addison, Benjamin P Alsopp, E. L. Norton, and Samuel W. Travers solicited proxies to use at the April 5th annual stockholders' meeting, claiming, according to reports, that "management has refused them adequate information regarding the property. President E.P. Swenson denies that information has been thus withheld and states that the board, which represents the dominant interests, has no vacancies at the present time."

=== 1928–1931 shareholder proxy fight ===
In 1928, shareholder and scion of one of the founding investment firms, John Langbourne Williams & Sons, Langbourne Meade Williams, Jr. launched a proxy fight for control of the company. In 1929, he then sought help from his former supervisor at Lee, Higginson & Co., J.T. Claiborne, who then enlisted clerk John Hay Whitney – who had become one of the wealthiest men in America following the 1927 death of his father, Payne Whitney. Williams eventually gained control of the company from founder Swenson, becoming its president in 1931, with Claiborne as a vice-president, and Whitney as chairman. Williams also served as chairman during 1958–1967.

=== 1930s ===
Williams led the company's diversification, beginning with the purchase of manganese deposits in Oriente Province, Cuba.

The company announced on February 19, 1931, the acquisition of a controlling interest in the Cuban American Manganese Corporation. Most of the metal was gained by concentration of low grade ore. The company benefited from (was subsidized by) zero import duty at a time when duties were high despite the United States reliance on imports for most of its supply of manganese. The deposit was depleted and the company dissolved in 1947.

In 1932, Freeport Sulphur Company acquired the sulfur rights for Lake Grande Ecaille and vicinity in Plaquemines Parish, Louisiana, and escalated the development of sulfur deposits in the Grand Ecaille dome in 1933, still using the Frasch Process developed by Dr. Herman Frasch, who had, in 1895, enjoined the American Sulphur Company into a partnership, forming the Union Sulphur Company, to initiate the first successful sulfur mining at Grand Ecaille, with which Freeport, like other competitors, would compete upon expiry of the Frasch patents in 1908. From its earliest inception, sulfur mining was the catalyst that developed Port Sulphur, Louisiana.

Effective January 1, 1937 the Freeport Texas Company changed its name to Freeport Sulphur Company (the old one was dissolved) and its character from a holding company to an operating company, likely as a response to the Revenue Act of 1936 to avoid double taxation. On this occasion all active subsidiaries except the Cuban-American Manganese Corp were liquidated.

=== 1950s ===
Freeport announced on March 7, 1952, the development of 3 new sulphur mines at an estimated cost of $20 million, to be financed from accrued cash reserves, as part of the national defense industrial mobilization program (Korea War). The effort grew into a $25 million program covering 4 new mines, one major (Garden Isle Bay) and 3 minor (Bay Ste. Elaine, Nash, Chacahoula) with a combined new capacity of 750,000 long tons per year, in addition to the existing Hoskins Mound (closed in 1955) and Grand Ecaille mines.

The company produced nickel during World War II and potash in the 1950s. In 1955, Freeport Nickel invested $119 million, of which $100 million came from the U.S. government, into construction of a nickel-cobalt mine at Moa Bay, Cuba, and a refinery at Port Nickel, Louisiana. On March 11, 1957, the U.S. government announced a contract to buy nickel and cobalt from the company.

In 1956, the company formed the Freeport Oil Company. In 1958, the company sold an oil discovery near Lake Washington in Louisiana for approximately $100 million to Magnolia Petroleum Company.

In 1959, Freeport geologists confirmed the 1936 Dutch discovery of the rich Ertsberg copper and gold deposits, now known as the Grasberg mine, in extremely rugged, remote country in the Jayawijaya Mountains in what was then called the Netherlands New Guinea.

=== 1960s ===
In 1960, Fidel Castro implemented a 25% ore tax, effectively nationalizing and seizing Freeport's nickel-mining operations in Cuba. In 1961, the company entered the kaolin business after purchasing the assets of Southern Clays Inc. In 1964, the company formed Freeport of Australia to pursue mining opportunities there and in the surrounding Pacific Ocean region.

==== Development of the Ertsberg deposit ====
In 1967, the company negotiated a contract with the Indonesian government to develop the Ertsberg deposit. In their feasibility study, Freeport geologists estimated that the orebody totaled 33 million tons averaging 2.5% copper, making it the largest above-ground copper deposit ever discovered. Construction of an open pit mine began in May 1970 and in mid-1973 the mine was declared fully operational. Officials at Bechtel, the primary project contractor, called mine development at Ertsberg "the most difficult engineering project they had ever undertaken". The challenges included building a 101-kilometre (63 mi) long access road (a project that required boring kilometer long tunnels through two mountains) and constructing the world's longest single span aerial tramway. The tramways were needed to move people, supplies and ore because a 2,000-foot (610 m) cliff separates the Ertsberg mine (at 12,000 feet (3,700 m) elevation) from the mill (at 10,000 feet). Moving copper concentrate from that mill to the shipping port required installation of a 109-kilometre (68 mi) slurry pipeline – then the world's longest. Mine construction and startup cost about US$200 million. The Ertsberg project was an engineering marvel, but the mine's early financial performance was disappointing. Depressed copper prices and high operating costs kept profits marginal during the 1970s.

In 1967 The McMoRan Oil and Gas Company was founded by three partners, William Kennon McWilliams Jr. ("Mc"), James Robert (Jim Bob) Moffett ("Mo"), who were both petroleum geologists, and Mack Rankin ("Ran"), a specialist in land-leasing and sales operations. In 1981, McMoRan would merge with Freeport Minerals, formerly Freeport Sulphur, to form Freeport-McMoRan.

=== 1970s ===
In 1971, the company changed its name to Freeport Minerals Company, (not to be confused with Freeport Minerals Corporation, founded in 1834).

=== 1980s ===
On April 7, 1981, Freeport Minerals Company merged with the McMoRan Oil and Gas Company.

In 1981, the company formed a 70/30 joint venture with an affiliate of FMC Corporation to operate the Jerritt Canyon gold mine near Elko, Nevada. In 1985, the company headquarters moved to New Orleans, Louisiana. The company also sold a 25% interest in oil and gas assets primarily in the western United States to Britoil for $73.5 million.

In 1989, the company sold about $1.5 billion in assets to finance development of the Grasberg mine and the Main Pass offshore sulfur-oil-gas deposit off Louisiana.

=== 1990s ===
In July 1995, the company completed the corporate spin-off, first announced in May 1994, of its entire interest in Freeport-McMoRan Copper & Gold, which owned the Grasberg mine. (Note: Freeport-McMoRan Inc. (FTX) redeemed its 6.55% convertible notes due Jan 15, 2001. Of the $373 principal amount, $16.4 million were redeemed with $15.0 million in cash and the remainder converted to 19.9 million FTX shares, which afterwards totaled 167.9 million. Among these 167.9 million FTX shares all 117,909,323 class B common shares of Freeport McMoRan Copper & Gold Inc (FCX) in FTX's possession were distributed (ca. 0.702 FCX shares for each FTX share) and fractional shares distributed as cash. FCX class A had the right to vote for 20%, class B for 80% of the Board of Directors of FCX.)

In 1995, RTZ, a predecessor of Rio Tinto Group, made a $450 million investment in the company. (Note: FTX sold 21.5 million FCX class A common shares for $450 million in May 1995 and 2.4 million shares for $50.2 million on July 5, 1995)

In 1997, IMC Global, a large fertilizer producer, acquired Freeport-McMoRan Inc., the former parent company that now owned the sulfur and fertilizer businesses, in a $750 million transaction. Shareholders of Freeport-McMoRan received shares of IMC Global.

In 1997, the Indonesian government asked Freeport-McMoRan to substantiate the Canadian mining company Bre-X's claims of having found the largest gold mine ever discovered, in Borneo. Freeport announced that its prospective partner Bre-X did not have gold reserves at its Indonesian mine, as it had reported. Bre-X subsequently was exposed as a fraud and went bankrupt.

In 1998, low commodity prices forced the company to suspend its dividend.

=== 2000s ===
In 2003, the company was subpoenaed as part of an investigation by anti-trust authorities in the United States, Canada, and Europe into price fixing in the copper industry.

On March 19, 2007, the company acquired Phelps Dodge (for $25.9 Billion) and became the largest copper producer of any public company in the world. The corporate headquarters was moved from New Orleans, Louisiana to Phoenix, Arizona.

=== 2010s ===
In 2012, the company announced agreements to acquire affiliated companies McMoRan Exploration Company and Plains Exploration & Production Company for a total enterprise value of over $20 billion. The transaction added significantly to the company's petroleum assets. The transaction was criticized as a conflict of interest due to the common ownership of the companies. In 2015, the company paid a $137.5 million settlement to resolve claims that executives and directors had conflicts of interest that resulted in the company overpaying in that transaction.

In 2014, the company sold its assets in the Eagle Ford shale to Encana for $3.1 billion. In 2015, the company announced job cuts at its Sierrita Mine in Arizona due to low copper and molybdenum prices.

On December 28, 2015, the company announced that James R. Moffett would resign as chairman of the company and be replaced by Gerald J. Ford. Moffett received $16.1 million in severance pay and cash retirement plans totaling more than $63 million. Moffett continued to consult for the company for annual fees of $1.5 million.

In May 2016, the company sold a 13% interest in its Morenci Mine to Sumitomo Group for $1 billion in cash.

In 2016, Freeport sold its deepwater assets, including the Marlin TLP, and the Holstein and Horn Mountain spars, to Anadarko Petroleum.

In August 2017, the company agreed to give a 51% interest in the Grasberg mine to the Government of Indonesia and build a smelter in exchange for a special permit to operate the mine until 2041.

In 2018, the company ranked at number 176 on the Fortune 500 list. During this year, Indonesian President Joko Widodo also planned to take control of 51% of Freeport Indonesia's equity, effectively handing over Freeport control to the Indonesian government. The Indonesian government planned to settle payments of $3.85 billion during the takeover process and finalized the process on December 21, 2018.

During 2018 Freeport-McMoRan Copper & Gold along with 90 additional Fortune 500 companies "paid an effective federal tax rate of 0% or less" as a result of the Tax Cuts and Jobs Act of 2017.

== Operations as of 2019 ==
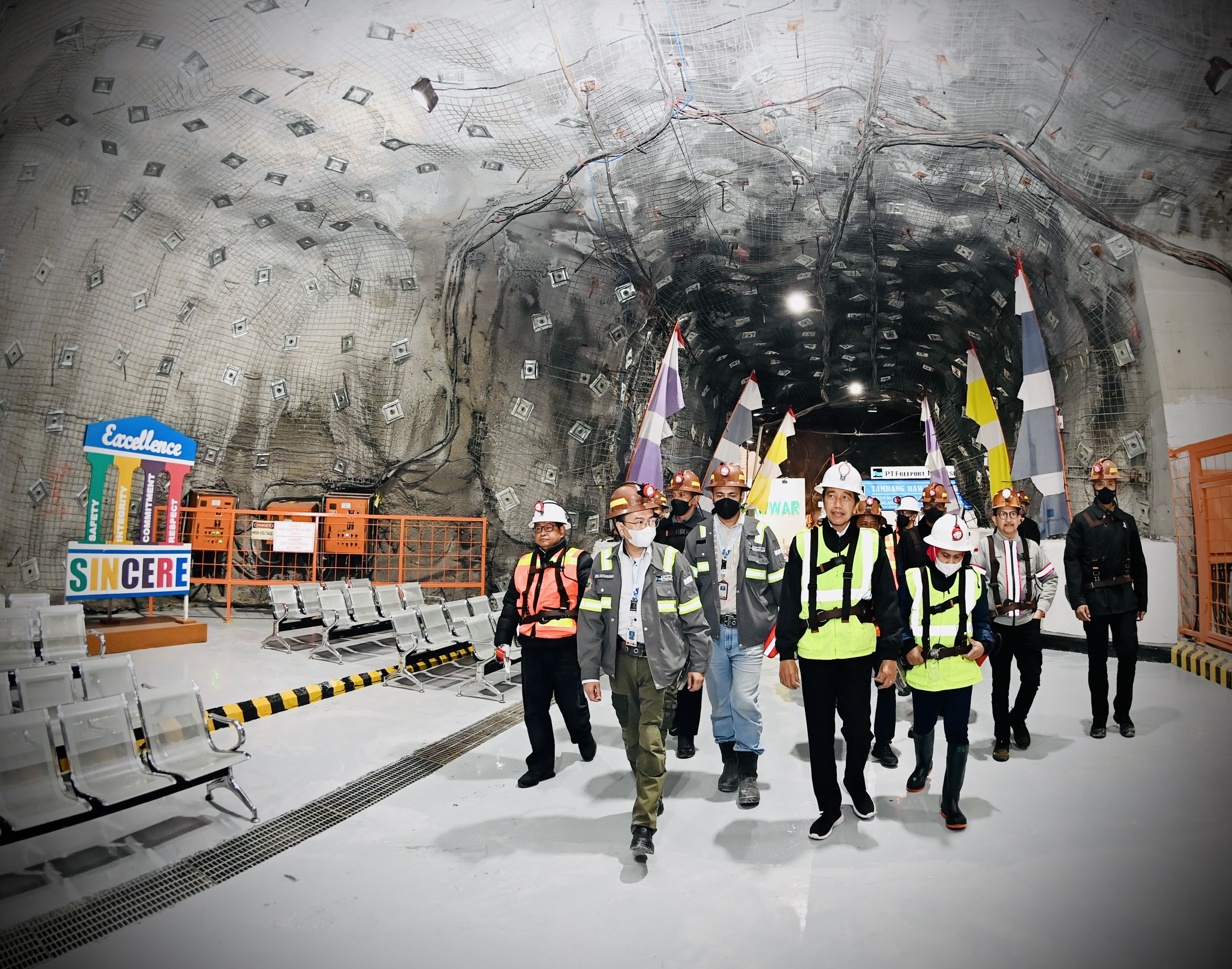
Underground portion of Grasberg Mine in Central Papua visited by President of Indonesia Joko Widodo

Freeport is the world's largest producer of molybdenum, and one of the largest producers of copper. In 2019, 79% of its revenues were from the sale of copper, 11% were from the sale of gold, and 8% were from the sale of molybdenum. In 2019, sales to the company's copper refining joint venture in Gresik Regency accounted for 13% of the total revenues of the company.

Some of the company's mining operations have been as follows:

=== Africa ===
Freeport Cobalt held a 100% interest in Kisanfu, a copper and cobalt exploration project located near Tenke, Democratic Republic of the Congo. This subsidiary also owns a large cobalt refinery in Kokkola, Finland, along with a related sales and marketing business. FCX has an effective 56% of that enterprise. Negotiations in 2016 to include these cobalt projects in a sale to China Molybdenum of Tenke Fungurume Mine, a cobalt/copper mine in DRC Congo, were not successful. Instead, the Kisanfu mine was sold to China Molybdenum in a separate transaction in 2020.

=== Europe ===
In December 2019, Freeport Cobalt (a joint venture between Freeport-McMoRan and Lundin Mining) sold its cobalt refinery in Kokkola, Finland to Umicore. FCX held an effective 56% interest in that enterprise.

=== North America ===
Arizona

- Bagdad, Arizona – 100% owned (copper, molybdenum)
- Miami, Arizona – 100% owned (copper)
- Morenci, Arizona – 72% owned (copper)
- Safford mine, Safford, Arizona – 100% owned (copper)
- Sierrita mine, Arizona (includes Twin Buttes & Esperanza) – 100% owned (copper, molybdenum)

Colorado

- Climax mine, Leadville, Colorado – 100% owned (molybdenum)
- Henderson molybdenum mine, Empire, Colorado – 100% owned (molybdenum)

New Mexico

- Chino mine, Santa Rita, New Mexico – 100% owned (copper, molybdenum)
- Tyrone, New Mexico – 100% owned (copper)

=== South America ===
- El Abra, Chile – 51% owned (copper)
- Cerro Verde, Peru – 54% owned (copper, molybdenum)

=== Europe ===
- Atlantic Copper, Huelva, Spain – 100% owned copper refinery

=== Indonesia ===
- Grasberg, Central Papua, Indonesia – 49% owned (copper, gold, silver)

== Controversies ==
=== Safety record ===
In 2011, Freeport was fined by the U.S. Department of Labor's Mine Safety and Health Administration over the death of a miner. The 67-year-old man had fallen into a hole created by the removal of two steel gratings. It was concluded that Freeport had not done enough to indicate that the hole was there.

=== Grasberg Mine, human rights and environment ===
Freeport has had a troubled relationship with the Amungme and Kamoro peoples since it arrived in Papua, Indonesia in 1967 to operate the world's largest and most profitable gold mine, the Grasberg mine. Freeport allegedly damaged 30.000 hectares of the rainforest and two major rivers, on which they depend for their food, water, livelihoods, and traditions. The company is a signatory participant of the Voluntary Principles on Security and Human Rights. Pressured by cultural and economic deterioration, there were numerous quarrels, between the tribes, Freeport, and the Indonesian military.

According to a 1996 Dames & Moore environmental audit the Grasberg mine's tailings "severely impacted" more than 11 square miles (28 km^{2}) of rainforest. The report, endorsed by Freeport, also estimated that during the life of the mine 3.2 billion tons of waste rock – large components of which generate acid – would be dumped into the local river system. Overburden (waste rock) from the mine had already polluted a nearby lake due to acid mine drainage.

In 2003, a landslide killed eight workers. A government study concluded that the incident was the result of negligence. Important warning signs had been detected two days prior. In response to this, management moved some equipment, but did not keep workers out of the area. A month later two workers died from being exposed to sulfur fumes. The government ultimately overturned its conclusion and attributed the incident to natural causes.

In 2005, The New York Times reported that the company paid local military and police generals, colonels, majors and captains, and military units, a total of nearly US$20 million between 1998 and 2004. One individual received up to US$150,000. The payments were meant to secure the reserve. The company responded that the payments did not go to individuals, but went into infrastructure, food, housing, fuel, travel, vehicle repairs, and allowances to cover incidental and administrative costs. According to the report, anonymous sources within the company claimed that company chairman James R. Moffet courted Indonesia's dictator Suharto and "his cronies", cutting them in on deals. Another employee is said to have worked on a program to monitor environmentalists' telephone and email conversations, in collaboration with Indonesian military intelligence officers.

In 2006, citing extensive, long-term and irreversible environmental damage in New Guinea, the Government Pension Fund of Norway excluded Freeport-McMoRan from its investment portfolio, following a recommendation from the fund's ethical council.

In 2013, a tunnel collapse killed 28 workers. The Freeport geological team claimed that the collapse at the Big Gossan tunnel was caused by erosion of the ceiling, brought about by the continuous infiltration of the limestone wallrocks by corrosive acidic groundwater. Freeport was accused of negligence by the Indonesian National Human Rights Commission.

=== Attacks by Papuan militants ===
On 11 July 2009, a Freeport-McMoRan employee was shot dead in an attack outside the company's mine in Papua.

On 11 February 2026, an attack targeted a Freeport Indonesia convoy, killing an Indonesian soldier and injuring a Freeport-McMoRan employee and an officer. Exactly one month later, West Papua National Liberation Army militants ambushed a Freeport-McMoRan truck at the Grasberg minesite. One employee was killed and another was wounded.

=== Environmental record ===
Based on 2014 data, the Political Economy Research Institute ranked Freeport-McMoRan 13th among corporations emitting airborne pollutants in the U.S. The ranking is based on emission quantities and toxicity.

After discovery of uranium and sulfate in the groundwater, Cyprus Tohono Corporation provided North Komelik, Arizona residents with bottled water until 2003. In 2003, two new supply wells were installed six miles south of the village. The mine used various mining methods to process ore into copper, and these methods required a mix of chemical fluids. Workers disposed of these chemicals in two areas downhill from the mine in unlined ponds. As a result, the liquid chemicals seeped into the ground below the disposal area and polluted a groundwater drinking source known as the "basin-fill aquifer". The Tohono O'odham Nation, where the mine is located relies heavily upon groundwater to meet drinking water needs.

On October 15, 2009, the City of Blackwell filed suit against Freeport-McMoRan over the contamination caused by its Blackwell Zinc Smelter. The city considered the contamination a nuisance, and alleged that 58 million pounds of toxic waste remained in the city, causing illness within its 7,200 residents. The City of Blackwell and Freeport settled for $54M in February 2010. In 2012, Freeport agreed to a $119M settlement with the residents.

== Past holdings ==
=== Sulphur mines ===
==== Bryan Mound ====
A first demonstration run began on November 19, 1912, but the plant was quickly shut down again for adjustments. Operations were unsteady throughout 1913. In December one shipment of 730 tons was made to New York and the plant produced about 200 tons per week. The Bryan Mound was 25 feet tall. Five different companies had drilled about 16 holes into the mound in the search for oil, but found no hydrocarbons in commercially viable quantities and attached no value to the sulphur they encountered under the given conditions. During two years of prospecting and with total of $150,000 expended, the Freeport Sulphur syndicate drilled 11 holes, each of them showing sulphur at between 760 feet and 1,100 feet in the form of sulphur bearing limestone, dolomite and gypsum with some beds of pure sulphur up to 7 feet thick. The deposit was carried at a bit below $30,000,000 of estimated value in the 1918 balance sheet. Bryan Mound production was not entirely continuous. To reduce stockpiles, work was suspended from April 1, 1921 until May 1922 and then again from January 31, 1924 to May 15, 1925. During production periods not all of the plants were necessarily in operation. The four plants were built by Westinghouse, Church, Kerr & Co and together were considered to be among the largest oil burning installations in the world.

Bryanmound boiler plants (Nov 1918)
Name	Location	Boilers (Note: While rated at a combined 23,800hp the plants were customarily operated at 150% or 36,000hp)	Water pumps	Water heaters	Air compressors	Comm.
A	south side of the mound (Note: On sheet 10 of the 1926 Sanborn Fire Insurance Map)	4 x 750 hp	25	2		Nov 19, 1912
B	south side of the mound	8 x 500 hp	25	5	4	Oct 1914
C	3,500 ft north of A and B (Note: On sheet 9 of the 1926 Sanborn Fire Insurance Map)	12 x 750 hp (Note: Plant also generated electricity for the entire site and was projected to meet the demand of the port and town for years to come)	49	10	4	unit 1: May 1916 unit 2: June 1916
D	3,500 ft north of A and B	12 x 750 hp	49	10	4	unit 1: Feb 1917 unit 2: Mar 1917

Freeport Sulphur Co. was also prospecting for oil at Bryan Mound. They found a (decomposing) tree in January 1919 at a record-candidate depth of 2,883 ft.

==== Hoskins Mound ====
In 1923, Freeport started producing sulfur from Hoskins Mound in Brazoria County, Texas.

The sulphur was obtained from a depth of between 900 and 1,300 feet. The plant equipment was purchased in 1918 intended to become the 5th plant at Bryanmound, but those plans were abandoned with the end of World War I. Temporary housing, water reservoirs and the excavation for the foundation were all completed before the first train brought cement to the construction site on October 7, 1922. The power plant of steel and brick construction had a 175 foot by 13 foot chimney and was completed on March 26, 1923, with the first turbogenerator already in service since March 10. In the beginning, oil was burned at the Hoskins Mound plant, transported by tank cars from Freeport, stored in 2x15,000bbl tanks and one 55,000bbl reserve tank. These 85,000bbl constituted about 2 months worth of supply (a little more than 1,400bpd). The power generation came from 6 batteries of 2x702hp Stirling boilers (ca. 8,400 hp total). Two 500kW turbogenerators supplied 2,200 volt 3-phase current for those water pumps some distance from the boiler house, the lights, and several auxiliary devices. Hoskins Mound was property of Texaco which received a $1 royalty per ton, as well as 50% of the profits until the time when Freeport had accumulated $2 million of the profit, at which point the contract (dated March 14, 1922) called for 70% of the profits to go to Texaco. The plant was built by Dwight P. Robinson & Co, which by then had absorbed Westinghouse, Church, Kerr & Co, builder of the Bryan Mound plants.

==== Garden Island Bay ====
Production started the first week of December 1953 (preliminary activity in November). with approximately 500,000 tons per year capacity, Garden Island Bay was the largest of 4 new mines brought online in Freeport's early 1950s expansion program and in fact the largest new mine in the entire industry since Grand Ecaille in 1933. It was built at a cost of $14 million in an isolated marshland, the only other industrial facility within a 75-mile radius was Freeport's own Grande Ecaille. With the area only a foot or two above sea level, to protect against flooding it was necessary to pour an above-ground foundation, some 16 feet high resting on concrete pilings driven into the ground. When finished the plant could only be reached by boat or seaplane. The power plant and the drill site were 1 mile apart. The sulphur was brought by barges in liquid form to Port Sulphur. Even though Freeport already had the capability to use salty water in its process, this was not used and instead 2 earthen reservoirs together 1 square mile in size and holding almost a billion gallons could satisfy the plants demand for 3.5 million gallons per day. The reservoirs were filled between February and June, when salt water intrusion into the Mississippi river was at its seasonal low point. The sulphur mining rights were obtained in the beginning of 1951 from Texaco, which retained 50% of the profits. The discovery (Note: The announcement included fairly detailed information of a planning stage, including the expected 500,000 tons per year capacity) of the deposit was announced by Freeport on August 22, 1951. In its first full year (1954) the plant produced in excess of its rated 500,000 tons.

==== Grand Isle ====
Grand Isle was built (beginning on June 20, 1958) at a cost of $30 million of which $8 million represented the extra cost due to it being 7 miles off the coast of Grand Isle, Louisiana (it was the first ever offshore sulphur mine). The plant began operations on April 14, 1960. Its location in the general vicinity of Port Sulphur meant that the port was used as the transshipment hub for this mine. The offshore platform at a depth of 50 feet of water had an Y-shape, where the power plant on the far end was followed by a platform for living quarters and then the heliport, after which it bifurcated and led to 2 production platforms (the second was built in 1962 at a cost of $3.5 million), both of which allowed for 108 holes to be drilled directionally from 36 surface locations to a typical depth of 2,200 ft with a horizontal deviation of up to 1,250 ft and the holes thus fanned out into a kind of pyramid shape below each platform. The new mine was highly automated and originally required 75 workers to run. There were two groups where each alternately worked for 5 days and then rested 5 days. A special engineering feature was the 7 mile undersea molten sulphur pipeline which was buried 5 ft beneath the ocean floor. It consisted of a 14-inch outer diameter casing which enclosed a thermally insulating air volume and a 7 5/8-inch OD hot water pipeline which in turn contained a concentric 6-inch OD molten sulphur line. Outside of the 14-inch casing one pipe was attached for hot water return to the mine and one for fresh water supply to the mine (but salt water was pumped into the deposit). Sulphur entered the line at 320 °F and exited at the shore of Grand Isle at 280 °F from where it was shipped still in liquid form by barges to Port Sulphur. The original plant had a capacity of 2,500-3,300 tons of sulphur per day and a requirement for 13mmcfd of natural gas. The sulphur rights were obtained in 1956 from Humble Oil which retained a right to 50% of the profits. The former platform was turned into an artificial reef and is today totally submerged.

=== Minor Sulphur Mines ===
==== Bay Ste. Elaine ====
Freeport announced the development of a new process (Note: US2756207 (July 24, 1956) - Sea Water Heating; Water is heated under pressure in 2 stages where scale forming salts precipitate out in the low temperature first stage in which they form only a soft layer instead of a hard scale; US2759328 (August 21, 1956) - Pressurized heater for producing hot process water in large quantities from scale-forming water) for the use of seawater in Frasch mining on February 18, 1952. Bay Ste. [Sainte] Elaine was a relatively small mine, but notable not only for the first use of salt water in a Frasch mine, but also for the mounting of the principle plant equipment on barges instead of dredging an artificial island, which was the solution chosen for the company's first Louisiana marshland mine (Grand Ecaille). The power plant on the main 200 ft long, 40 ft wide and 12 ft deep barge (photograph:) was installed at Grand Ecaille and towed in place. The barge was partially sunk and main deck level was 6.5 ft above the water line. The boilers ran on a fresh water cycle going through heat exchangers. Heat exchangers were of corrosion-resistant steel and salt water pipes had a cement lining. The plant was designed for parallel operation of 6 wells and rated at 100,000 long tons per year. Two 1,000 ton 1.5 million gallon 224 ft x 39 ft x 8ft5in insulated tank barges towed by a 800 hp twin-screw diesel towboat brought the molten sulphur to Port Sulphur, 75 miles and an optimal round trip delay of 36 hours away (i.e. 666 tons per day maximum average ferrying capacity on a tight schedule since mine operation was continuous). Bay Ste. Elaine required a workforce of 85 and 100 when including support personnel at Port Sulphur and Grand Ecaille. From the beginning it was accepted that the BSE operation may not actually be profitable. Texaco had leased the land covering the Bay Ste. Elaine, Dog Lake and Lake Pelto dome areas in 1928 from the Louisiana Land & Exploration Co. (Note: A medium-sized land and royalty company with holdings (as of 1953) of 743,000 acres of oil lands in Louisiana and 8 other states) and had sublet some of it on February 27, 1951, to Freeport Sulphur. Louisiana Land and Texaco shared equally in a $2 per ton royalty and 40% of net profits.

==== Nash ====
Commencement of operations was announced on February 2, 1954. The land was held in trust by the Kentucky Female Orphan School of Midway, Kentucky and the school received royalties. Even among the minor deposits, Nash was especially small.

==== Chacahoula ====
Operations began on March 10, 1955.

==== Lake Pelto ====
Full scale development began in June 1960. The plant for the most part was reused from the decommissioned Bay Ste. Elaine mine, including the 200 ft-barge-mobile-power-plant which was lifted to rest on a foundation on the Pelto artificial island. Like at Bay Ste. Elaine, sea water was pumped into the deposit. The drill site was 1 mile from the island base facilities. The field pipe line was installed at an elevation of 20 ft. Along this pipe line, 4,800 ft from the main island a prefabricated steel structure relay station and the relay tower from Bay Ste. Elaine mine were installed, the latter's height increased to 150 ft. From the communication station a further 2,560 ft of pipe led to the production area. The sulphur was brought in liquid form by barge to Port Sulphur.

=== Metal mines ===
Cuban Manganese production (x1000kg) (Note: 36-50+% of both sorted ore and concentrate)
1931	96
1932	9,800
1933	28,000
1934	68,000
1935	35,269
1936	48,471
1937	131,299
1938	123,844
1939	102,415
1940	119,852
1941	251,385
1942	249,255
1943	311,214
1944	257,864
1945	198,243
1946	130,764
1947	50,397
1948	29,073
1949	62,503
1950	79,209
1951	154,091

Cuban-American Manganese Corporation (1931–1947):
The Delaware company offered the first block of 140,000 no par common shares out of an authorized 250,000 in September 1928. The capital was increased to 350,000 authorized shares on February 14, 1931. The Freeport Texas Co. announced on February 19, 1931, the acquisition of a controlling interest (resulting in 9 of 15 Board members) in the Cuban-American Manganese Corporation, owner of 10,000 acres of manganese deposits within 25 miles of Santiago adjacent to the Cuban Railway main line. A plant to process 1,000 tons a day of ore and produce 100,000 tons a year of 50% concentrate was to be constructed within one year. Before 1921 some of the properties were operated by Rand & Aguilara. A prior attempt to finish the plant by July 1929 was apparently not a success. The froth flotation process (Note: US1,955,039 (Apr 17, 1934) - Concentrating Manganese Ores; A novel reagent combination of fish soap, crude oil and kerosene; US1,911,865 (May 30, 1933) - Concentrating Manganese Ores; Adding tannin to the reagent mixture to increase Mn yield from 43% to 46.9% (with sintering: 50.7% to 54.7%)) for concentrating the ore had been developed and tested at commercial scale by Freeport and the B. F. Goodrich Company, who were the principal minority shareholders in the Cuban company. Cuba was not an important producer of manganese and in fact the company worked the only commercially viable deposit in the country which was only viable because it was free from tariffs on import to the United States which heavily relied on importation of the metal. In July 1932 Cuban-American floated 700,000 shares of par $2 8% preferred stock, convertible to common one-for-one at any time. In 1932 Freeport bought additional shares for $699,327 out of its cash reserve. At the end of 1934 the investment stood at 313,621 preferred and 289,715.5 common shares (86.19% of voting shares) and was carried as the principal constituent of the Investments at Cost ($2,727,961) row in the balance sheet. The US-Brazilian trade agreement of February 2, 1935 lowered the manganese import duty by 50% and the plant had to shut down on May 1, 1935, due to the loss of competitive advantage, although the sorting and shipping of high grade ore was continued. The company invested $500,000 into a wet-processing sintering kiln process to increase efficiency and could reopen in early 1937. Total investment was estimated at $3,000,000. In 1941 the Metals Reserve Corp contracted for between 25,000 and 65,000 long tons of concentrate a year over 3 years and plant capacity was increased from 100,000 to 130,000 tons of >=50% concentrate per year. The plant could also produce an additional 50,000 tons of 39-40% concentrate. The company for the first time paid a dividend on its common stock (50 cents) on December 27, 1940. At the time there were 355,873 common shares outstanding and on January 15, 1941, all 594,127 shares of $2 par preferred stock were called unless converted to common stock at a rate of one-for-one before that date. Freeport Sulphur announced it would convert its entire holding of 95% of the preferred. In December 1946 depletion of the mine was imminent. The Cuban-American Manganese Corp was dissolved. For each 95 shares of the company one share of par $50 stock of the Cuban Mining Co. subsidiary was distributed from a total of 10,000 authorized and outstanding shares. Freeport Sulphur owned 94% of the shares of Manganese Corp and thus received 94% of the stock of Cuban Mining Co. Additionally each of the 950,000 shares received $4.958 in cash. Plans were set in motion to convert the plant to produce Portland cement, but this led nowhere and on August 12, 1947, it was announced that the Cuban Mining Co. would also be dissolved. Freeport received $30 per share on September 29, 1947, and $45 per share on October 31, 1947, from this liquidation. The liquidation value of both companies was thus $5,460,100.

Jerritt Canyon mine, near Elko, Nevada has produced over 8 million ounces of gold since 1981. Originally a joint venture of Freeport McMoRan (FCX) with FMC Corporation, then FMC Gold then Meridian Gold, Freeport's share of Jerritt Canyon was then sold to Independence Mining Co., a subsidiary of Minorco (an Anglo American Corporation subsidiary). Minorco later divested all its gold mining assets to AngloGold. AngloGold and Meridian Gold sold the mine to Queenstake Resources in 2003. In 2007 Queenstake and Yukon Gold Corp merged to become Yukon-Nevada Gold, which in 2012 became Veris Gold. Veris Gold operated under U.S. Bankruptcy Code and the Companies' Creditors Arrangement Act bankruptcy protections of Canada from June 9, 2014. Sprott Mining bought the concern after the Canadian bankruptcy court ordered Veris to sell its assets.

In May 2016 Freeport announced an agreement to sell its interests in TF Holdings to China Molybdenum Co., Ltd. (CMOC) for $2.65 billion in cash and possibly more if the average copper price rose enough to trigger the increase in the following 24 months. TF Holdings was a Bermuda holding company with indirect ownership of 80% of Tenke Fungurume Mine. Since FCX had owned 70% ownership of TF Holdings, the sale gave China Molybdenum a 56% interest in Tenke Fungurume Mine. The parties discussed including Kokkola refinery and Kisanfu Exploration in the sale, but did not agree on the terms to do so.

In December 2020, Freeport completed the sale of its interests in the Kisanfu undeveloped project in Democratic Republic of Congo to a wholly owned subsidiary of China Molybdenum Co., Ltd. for US$550 million.

== Past board members ==
Past board members include Henry Kissinger, John Hay Whitney, Robert A. Lovett, Benno C. Schmidt Sr., Gus Long, Arleigh Burke, J. Stapleton Roy, Godfrey Rockefeller and his cousin-in-law, Jean Mauzé.
