= Richard Adkerson =

American business executive

- Education: Mississippi State University
- Occupation: Business executive
- Employers: Arthur Andersen; Freeport-McMoRan

Richard C. Adkerson is an American business executive who currently serves as Chairman of the Board at Freeport-McMoRan. He was the chief executive officer (CEO) of Freeport from 2003 until June 2024 and has been a member of its board since 2006, taking on the role of chairman in February 2021.

== Education ==
Adkerson earned a bachelor's degree in accounting with the highest honors in 1969 and an MBA in 1970, both from Mississippi State University. He also attended the Advanced Management Program at Harvard Business School in 1988 and was awarded an Honorary Doctor of Science from Mississippi State in 2010.

Adkerson was named National Alumnus of the Year of Mississippi State University in 2011 and The Richard C. Adkerson School of Accountancy is named in his honor.

== Career ==
Prior to joining Freeport-McMoRan in 1989, Adkerson was partner and managing director at Arthur Andersen & Co. where he headed the firm's worldwide oil and gas industry practice. From 1976 to 1978, he was a Professional Accounting Fellow with the Securities and Exchange Commission in Washington, D.C.

== Board memberships ==
Adkerson has been a member of the International Council on Mining and Metals since 2005, serving as its Chair during two separate terms (2008-2011 and 2020-2022). He is a member of The Business Council, the Business Roundtable and the Council on Foreign Relations.

Adkerson is a member and past President of the Mississippi State University Foundation Board of Directors, an emeritus member of the Executive Advisory Board for the College of Business, and chaired the "State of the Future" capital campaign.

Adkerson serves as the chairman emeritus of the Board of Trustees of the National World War II Museum and as a member of the Board of Visitors of the MD Anderson Cancer Center in Houston, Texas, and was campaign chair of the Banner M.D. Anderson Cancer Center's Has Met Its Match campaign in Phoenix. He served as the honorary chair of the Phoenix Zoo's Join the Journey - Share our Pride Campaign.

== Personal life ==
Adkerson lives in Phoenix, Arizona. Sun Ranch Partners, managed by Adkerson, purchased the eponymous 18,500-acre ranch (7,500 ha) near Cameron, Montana in 2010. He is married to Nancy and has three sons.
