= Langbourne Williams =

American businessman (1903–1994)

- Born: Langbourne Meade Williams Jr. February 5, 1903; Richmond, Virginia, U.S.
- Died: September 8, 1994 (aged 91) near Rapidan, Orange County, Virginia, U.S.
- Resting place: Hollywood Cemetery
- Occupation: Businessman
- Spouse(s): Elizabeth Goodrich Stillman (m. 1930; died 1956) Frances Pinckney Breckinridge (m. 1959)

Langbourne Meade Williams Jr. (February 5, 1903 – September 8, 1994) was an American businessman from Virginia.

== Biography ==
Langbourne Meade Williams Jr. was born in Richmond, Virginia. He was one of eight children born to Langbourne Meade Williams (September 12, 1872 – April 2, 1932) and Susanne Catherine Nolting (August 29, 1876 – January 13, 1951). He was a descendant of Edmund Randolph, Bartholomew Dandridge and grandson of John Williams of the John L. Williams & Sons banking firm.

Williams graduated from the Episcopal High School in Alexandria, Virginia in 1921. He received a bachelor's degree at the University of Virginia in 1924, and gained a Harvard University master's degree in business administration in 1926. He worked for the New York investment banking firm of Lee, Higginson & Company for a year before joining the family firm of John L. Williams & Sons. One of the investments of the family firm was with the Freeport-Texas Company for which he and some associates decided to launch a corporate raid with a proxy fight in 1928. The previous management at one point filed a $1 million libel suit against Mr. Williams and his associates for accusations that the managers had put their interests ahead of their shareholders. In 1930, the Williams group prevailed by less than 4,000 shares. At age 27 he returned to New York to become vice president, treasurer and a director of the Freeport-Texas company. He became president of Freeport-Texas with John Hay Whitney as chairman three years later. Williams served as chairman from 1958 until 1967.

In 1941 Williams became a governor of New York Hospital, serving until 1961, when he was named an honorary governor. In 1948 he assisted with the Marshall Plan to rebuild Europe and later became a member of the Council on Foreign Relations. He was also a trustee of the George C. Marshall Research Foundation.

Williams came into conflict with the US Government after Freeport-Texas was caught in 1959 investigating a government official in a suspected attempt to influence the government stockpiling contract which the company had enjoyed since having their nickel declared a cold war strategic commodity. The chairman of a House Government Operations subcommittee, Jack Brooks, denounced Williams for "disgraceful, ethically reprehensible snooping," for hiring a former FBI investigator to look into the private life of a General Services Administration official supervising a nickel plant in Cuba. Claiming the Administration official was hostile, Williams said "we felt it necessary to find out whether there was some special reason for his attitude." Freeport's nickel-mining operations in Cuba were seized after Fidel Castro came to power in 1959.

In September 1930, Williams married Elizabeth Goodrich Stillman. She died in 1956. He married Frances Pinckney Breckinridge in 1959. He died on September 8, 1994, at his "Retreat" farm near Rapidan, Orange County, Virginia. He was buried in Hollywood Cemetery.
