= Benno C. Schmidt Sr. =

American lawyer

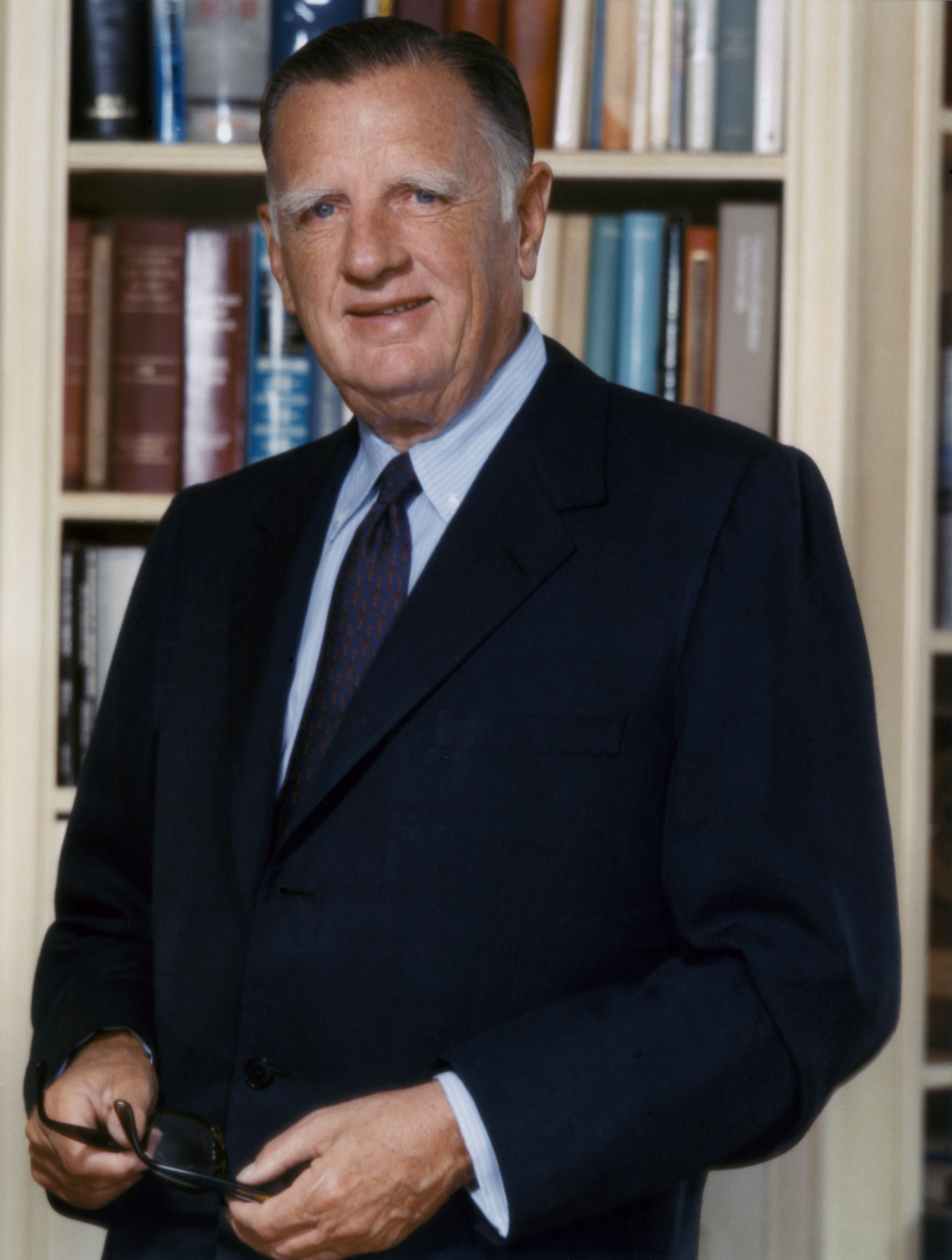
Benno Schmidt Sr.

Benno Schmidt Sr., (left) at the White House in 1973 with (left to right) President Richard Nixon, Dr. R. L. Clark (M. D. Anderson Cancer Center), and Dr. Robert A. Good.

Benno Charles Schmidt Sr. (January 10, 1913 – October 21, 1999) was an American lawyer and venture capitalist who was active in New York City civic affairs and played an important role in the initiation of the war on cancer.

== Life and career ==
Born in Abilene, Texas, Schmidt grew up in that city in a household that was not financially well-off, but placed an emphasis on education. His father died when he was 12, so his mother's job as a secretary supported the family.

Schmidt was educated at the University of Texas, where he received both his A.B. and law degrees in 1936. At Texas he was a member of Delta Kappa Epsilon fraternity and the Texas Cowboys. After receiving his law degree, he spent time as a member of the Texas law school faculty and at Harvard Law School as a Thayer Teaching Fellow. In 1942, following the United States' entrance into World War II, he enlisted in the U.S. Army. During his military service he rose to the rank of Colonel and was awarded several medals, including the Legion of Merit and Bronze Star Medal.

In late 1945, Jock Whitney invited him to join a new business he wanted to start to finance new companies seeking to capitalize on newly identified markets and social needs. In 1946 he became a partner in the business that Whitney had proposed, venture capital firm J.H. Whitney & Company. He became managing partner in 1960 and remained in that position until 1992.

Schmidt is credited with coining the term venture capital to describe the area of providing early or "seed" capital to aspiring entrepreneurs. The term was a shortening of the word "adventure".

One of the Whitney & Co.'s first investments was the Spencer Chemical Company, which was formed to acquire a nitrate explosives plant in Kansas that was being declared surplus by the U.S. government and convert the plant to produce ammonium nitrate fertilizer. Whitney and Schmidt put $1.5 million of Whitney's funds into Spencer and reaped a 20-fold profit on their investment. Another of Schmidt's successful initiatives at J. H. Whitney & Co. was acquiring an early stake in Minute Maid. Schmidt championed that investment over the Whitney's initial concern about the "tinny" taste of the company's orange juice concentrate.

Schmidt served on the boards of Memorial Sloan-Kettering Cancer Center, CBS and Freeport-McMoRan, among others. He was a trustee of the Whitney Museum of American Art. In 1971 U.S. President Richard M. Nixon appointed him to the chairmanship of the President's Cancer Panel, which initiated the U.S. federal government's war on cancer.

Schmidt was the chairman of Vertex Pharmaceuticals board and one of its largest early investors.

Schmidt had five sons, including Benno C. Schmidt Jr., who was President of Yale University and Dean of Columbia Law School.

Schmidt died from heart failure in October 1999 at the age of 86.
