= Kathleen L. Quirk =

American businesswoman

Kathleen Lynne Quirk (born 1963 or 1964) is an American businesswoman who is currently the President and Chief Executive Officer of Freeport-McMoRan (FCX),

== Early life ==
Quirk was born in New Orleans, Louisiana and is a third-generation Irish-American.

She earned a B.S. in Accounting from Louisiana State University.

== Career ==
Quirk joined Freeport-McMoRan in 1989. She became chief financial officer in 2003, president in 2021, and a director in 2023. She became chief executive officer in June 2024 after a 35-year career at the company.

Quirk was named among the "25 Highest Paid Women CFOs" in the world during 2010 by Fortune Magazine and, in 2015, was listed among the "Female CFOs in the Fortune 500". Bloomberg reported her 2016 income as $8,309,573.

She was appointed one of the 10 Directors of Vulcan Materials Company and was elected to the Board of Directors in October 2017.

== Philanthropy ==
She has served as a member of the Board of Directors of the Valley of the Sun United Way.
