= J. H. Whitney & Company =

American venture capital firm

- Type: Privately held company
- Industry: Private equity
- Founded: 1946; 80 years ago
- Founders: John Hay Whitney and Benno Schmidt
- Headquarters: New Canaan, Connecticut, United States
- Products: Investments, private equity funds
- AUM: $1.0 billion
- Number of employees: 9
- Website: www.whitney.com

J. H. Whitney & Company is an American venture capital firm founded in 1946 by partners John Hay Whitney and Benno Schmidt. Headquartered in New Canaan, Connecticut, it is currently focused primarily on leveraged buyouts, turnarounds, acquisitions, and recapitalizations of more mature companies, particularly those it considers to be in the middle market.

== History ==
=== Founding and early history ===
J. H. Whitney & Company was founded by John Hay Whitney, who put up $10 million after World War II to finance entrepreneurs with business plans who were unwelcome at banks. Mr. Whitney brought in Benno Schmidt as his partner to run the company.

When starting the company, Whitney wanted a broad team of young experts to be his deputies. He went to the deans of Harvard Business School, Yale Law School, and the MIT Graduate School of Engineering and asked each man who the best student they produced in the past five years was. The HBS dean cleverly responded that he was insulted that Whitney would think that he would simply rank his best students and hand the list out, but that if he was to do such an outrageous thing, he would rank C. Wrede Petersmeyer, a graduate the previous year, first. Whitney hired Petersmeyer the next day, and he went on to become a partner at the firm and run Whitney Communications.

Whitney had been investing since the 1930s, founding Pioneer Pictures in 1933 and acquiring a 15% interest in Technicolor Corporation with his cousin Cornelius Vanderbilt Whitney. What is considered today to be true private equity investments began to emerge after World War II, marked by the founding of the first two venture capital firms in 1946: American Research and Development Corporation and J. H. Whitney & Company.

Whitney became a highly professional organization, whereas before World War II, venture-capital investments were primarily the domain of wealthy individuals and families. Schmidt, in fact, is credited with coining the term "venture capital", originally known as "development capital". The company was originally described as a lender of "private adventure capital" and Schmidt shortened the term.

By far, Whitney's most famous investment during this period was in Florida Foods Corporation. The company developed an innovative method for delivering nutrition to American soldiers, which later came to be known as Minute Maid orange juice, and was sold to the Coca-Cola Company in 1960.

=== The 1980s and the move to leveraged buyouts ===
In response to the changing conditions, in the venture-capital industry in the 1980s, Whitney (and other early venture-capital firms including Warburg Pincus) began to transition away from venture capital toward leveraged buyouts and growth capital investments, which were in vogue in that decade.

Whitney's most public foray into the leveraged-buyout space came in 1989, when it completed the acquisition of Prime Computer. In 1988, "corporate raider" Bennett S. LeBow, who controlled a smaller computer maker, MAI Basic Four, began an attempted $970 million hostile takeover of Prime Computer. Management resisted LeBow's advances and eventually agreed to a $1.3 billion leveraged buyout, with Whitney acting as a white knight. For Whitney, owning Prime proved to be nearly a total loss with the bulk of the proceeds from the company's liquidation paid to the company's creditors.

Whitney completed other buyouts in the 1980s, including the acquisition of retailer Filene's Basement.

== Investments ==
The firm, which today is known as Whitney & Co. and also J. H. Whitney Capital Partners, LLC, continues to make investments in leveraged buyout transactions, and raised $800 million for its sixth institutional private equity fund in 2005. The $800 million raised in 2005 was a significant decrease from its previous funds, when the firm raised $1.1 billion in 2001 and $975 million in 2000 for Whitney V and IV, respectively. The performance of the 2000 vintage fund IV in particular was impacted by the firm's exposure to technology and internet businesses.
