= John Hay Whitney =

American diplomat and publisher (1904–1982)

50th United States Ambassador to the United Kingdom
- In office February 11, 1957 – January 14, 1961
- President: Dwight D. Eisenhower
- Preceded by: Winthrop W. Aldrich
- Succeeded by: David K. E. Bruce

Personal details
- Born: August 17, 1904 Ellsworth, Maine, U.S.
- Died: February 8, 1982 (aged 77) Manhasset, New York, U.S.
- Party: Republican
- Spouses: Mary Elizabeth Altemus (m. 1930; div. 1940) Betsey Cushing Roosevelt (m. 1942)
- Children: Kate Roosevelt Whitney; Sara D. Roosevelt Whitney
- Parent(s): Payne Whitney; Helen Julia Hay
- Relatives: See Whitney family
- Education: Groton School; Yale College
- Awards: Legion of Merit; Benjamin Franklin Medal

John Hay Whitney (August 17, 1904 – February 8, 1982) was an American venture capitalist, sportsman, philanthropist, newspaper publisher, film producer and diplomat who served as U.S. Ambassador to the United Kingdom, publisher of the New York Herald Tribune, and president of the Museum of Modern Art.

Born in 1904 to Payne Whitney and Helen Hay Whitney, Whitney was a member of the wealthy and prominent Whitney family, longstanding fixtures of New York City and New England society. After attending Groton School and Yale College, where he was an oarsman, he inherited a large fortune from his father, making him one of the wealthiest people in the United States. In 1929, he participated in a hostile takeover of Lee, Higginson & Co. with Langbourne Williams, rising to the position of chairman of the board at just 29 years old. In 1946, after serving in the Office of Strategic Services during World War II, he founded J. H. Whitney & Company, the oldest venture capital firm in the United States and the origin of the term venture capital. By the 1970s, he was one of the wealthiest men in the world.

Whitney was an influential figure in New York City politics and the politics of the Republican Party. As a moderate internationalist, Whitney was an early supporter of Dwight D. Eisenhower's presidential campaigns, and in 1957, Eisenhower appointed him United States Ambassador to the United Kingdom, a position which had been held by his grandfather and namesake, John Hay. While ambassador, Whitney improved relations between the two countries in the wake of the Suez Crisis and purchased the New York Herald Tribune. Through the Tribune, he was influential in the election of John Lindsay as mayor of New York City in 1965.

Whitney was a skilled polo player and raised thoroughbred racing horses, which won him the Cheltenham Gold Cup in 1929 and 1930 and were frequent entrants in the Kentucky Derby. He was a patron of the arts, financing several Broadway productions and films, including two Academy Award for Best Picture, Gone with the Wind (1939) and Rebecca (1940). He was an early supporter of Fred Astaire, his longtime friend, and helped secure Astaire his first major film contract with RKO Pictures. His large art collection included famous works by Pierre-Auguste Renoir, Claude Monet, Edgar Degas, Édouard Manet, Edward Hopper, Henri Matisse, James McNeill Whistler, John Singer Sargent, Paul Cézanne, Paul Gauguin, William Blake and Vincent van Gogh. Works from his collection have been exhibited at the Tate Gallery, the National Gallery of Art, the Museum of Modern Art, and the Yale University Art Gallery.

== Early life ==
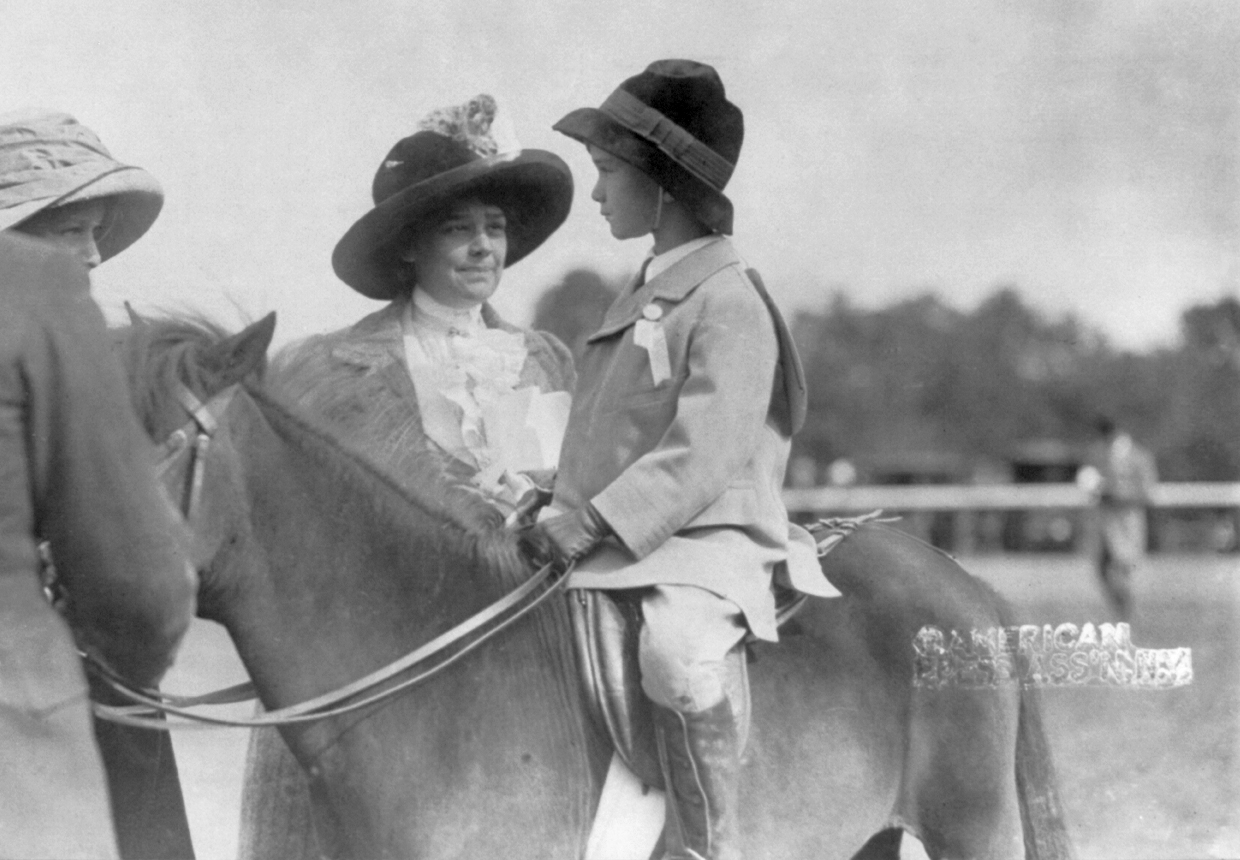
Helen Hay Whitney and her six-year-old son, John Hay Whitney (October 12, 1910)

Born on August 17, 1904, in Ellsworth, Maine, Whitney was a descendant of John Whitney, a Puritan who settled in Massachusetts in 1635, as well as of William Bradford, who came over on the Mayflower. His father was Payne Whitney, and his grandfathers were William C. Whitney and John Hay, both presidential cabinet members. His mother was Helen Hay Whitney.

The Whitneys' family mansion, Payne Whitney House on New York's Fifth Avenue, was around the corner from James B. Duke House, home of the founder of the American Tobacco Co., father of Doris Duke. Whitney's uncle, Oliver Hazard Payne, a business partner of John D. Rockefeller, arranged the funding for Duke to buy out his competitors.

Jock Whitney attended Groton School, then Yale College. He joined Delta Kappa Epsilon fraternity (Phi chapter), as his father had. Whitney, his father, grandfather, and great-uncle were oarsmen at Yale, and his father was captain of the crew in 1898. He was a member of Scroll and Key. While at Yale, he inspired the coining of the term "crew cut" for the haircut favored by the rowing crew which still bears the name. After graduating in 1926, Whitney went to Oxford University, but the death of his father on May 25, 1927, necessitated his returning home. He inherited a trust fund of $20 million (approximately $343.9 million in 2023 dollars), and later inherited four times that amount from his mother.

== Career ==
=== Business career ===
In 1929, Whitney, despite his vast wealth, was a clerk at the firm of Lee, Higginson & Co where, through his boss, J.T. Claiborne Jr., he met former Lee, Higginson clerk Langbourne Meade Williams Jr., who had come to Claiborne for help in his efforts to gain control of Freeport Texas Co. Williams was a scion of a founding investment firm in the sulfur mining company. In 1929, the year after Whitney became one of the wealthiest men in America, through inheritance, Williams enlisted the help of Whitney's boss, who then enlisted Whitney's financial participation, in his efforts to oust founder and Chairman Eric P. Swenson, casting Whitney in the role of corporate raider before the term existed. Whitney was soon Freeport's biggest shareholder, enabling Williams to replace the chairman and his management team. Claiborne was made a vice-president; Williams became Freeport's president in 1933, and Whitney was appointed chairman of the board.

In 1946, Whitney founded J.H. Whitney & Company, the oldest venture capital firm in the U.S., with Benno C. Schmidt Sr.—who coined the term "venture capital"—with J. T. Claiborne as a partner. Whitney put up $10 million to finance entrepreneurs with business plans who were unwelcome at banks. Companies Whitney invested in included Spencer Chemical and Minute Maid. In 1958, while he was still ambassador to the United Kingdom, his company Whitney Communications Corp. bought the New York Herald Tribune, and was its publisher from 1961 to its closure in 1966. He was chairman of the International Herald Tribune from 1966 until his death. Whitney Communications also owned and operated other newspapers, magazines and broadcasting stations. Whitney's television stations were sold to Dun & Bradstreet in 1969.

=== Theatre and motion pictures ===
Whitney invested in several Broadway shows, including Peter Arno's 1931 revue Here Goes the Bride, a failure that cost him $100,000, but was more successful as one of the backers of Life with Father.

An October 1934 Fortune article on the Technicolor Corporation noted Whitney's interest in pictures. He had met Technicolor head Herbert Kalmus at the Saratoga Race Course. In 1932, Technicolor achieved a breakthrough with its three-strip process. Merian C. Cooper of RKO Radio Pictures approached Whitney with the idea of investing in Technicolor. They joined forces and founded Pioneer Pictures in 1933, with a distribution deal with RKO to distribute Pioneer's films. Whitney and his cousin Cornelius Vanderbilt Whitney bought a 15% stake in Technicolor.

Whitney was also the major investor in David O. Selznick's production company Selznick International Pictures, putting up $870,000 and serving as chairman of the board. He put up half the money to option Margaret Mitchell's Gone with the Wind for the Selznick film version, in which he then invested, and later in Rebecca (1940).

=== Military career ===
Whitney served in the United States Army Air Forces as an intelligence officer during World War II, assigned to the Office of Strategic Services. This is where he met his good friend and future leader of the CIA, Allen Dulles. He was taken prisoner by the Germans in southern France, but escaped when the train transporting him to a POW camp came under Allied fire.

=== Thoroughbred horse racing ===
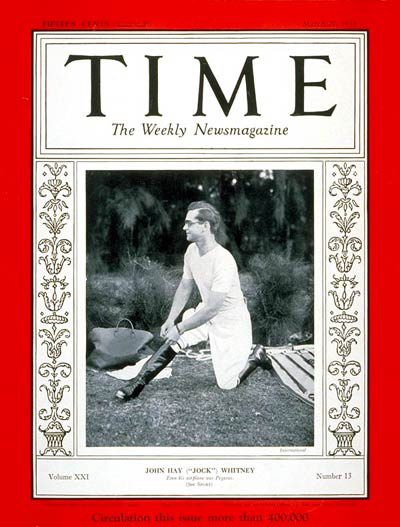
Jock Whitney on the cover of Time (March 27, 1933)

Whitney inherited his family's love of horses, a predilection he shared with his sister, Joan Whitney Payson. Jock and his sister ran Greentree Stables in the U.S., owned by their mother. In 1928, he became the youngest member ever elected to The Jockey Club.

Whitney and his first wife "Liz" raced horses both in the United States and in Europe. He owned Easter Hero, the Jack Anthony–trained horse who was the first to win the Cheltenham Gold Cup twice in succession, in 1929 under the mount of Dick Rees and again in 1930, when ridden by Tommy Cullinan. In the 1929 Grand National, his horse twisted a plate and was beaten by a nose at the finish. Although Whitney entered the Grand National annually, he never again came close to winning.

The Whitneys entered four horses in the Kentucky Derby in the 1930s, "Stepenfetchit", which finished 3rd in 1932, "Overtime", which finished 5th in 1933, "Singing Wood", which finished 8th in 1934, and "Heather Broom", which finished 3rd in 1939.

Jock Whitney was also an outstanding polo player, with a four-goal handicap, and it was as a sportsman that he made the cover of the March 27, 1933, issue of Time magazine.

In 2015, Whitney was posthumously inducted to the National Museum of Racing's Hall of Fame as Pillar of the Turf.

=== Political life ===
Whitney was the major backer of Dwight D. Eisenhower and a member of the New York Young Republican Club. Eisenhower appointed him United States Ambassador to the United Kingdom, a post held sixty years earlier by Whitney's grandfather John Hay. Whitney played a major role in improving Anglo-American relations, which had been severely strained during the 1956 Suez Crisis, when Eisenhower demanded that the British, French and Israelis terminate their invasion of Egypt.

== Personal life ==
In 1930, Whitney purchased the Llangollen estate as a bridal gift for his fiancée, the Pennsylvania socialite Mary Elizabeth "Liz" Altemus. It was a 2,200-acre (890 ha) historic equestrian farm just outside Middleburg, Virginia. They were married on September 23, 1931. Although married to Altemus, Whitney was romantically linked to Tallulah Bankhead, Joan Bennett, Paulette Goddard and Joan Crawford. Clark Gable and Carole Lombard met at one of Whitney's parties. In the early 1930s, Jock Whitney began an affair with Nina Gore Vidal; simultaneously, his wife had an affair with Nina Vidal's husband Eugene Vidal. The couple divorced in 1940, but Liz Whitney remained at Llangollen for the rest of her life, becoming an internationally renowned horse breeder and a member of the Virginia Thoroughbred Association Hall of Fame.

On March 1, 1942, he married Betsey Cushing Roosevelt Whitney, ex-wife of James Roosevelt, son of Franklin D. Roosevelt, and adopted her two daughters:

- Kate Roosevelt Whitney
- Sara Roosevelt Whitney (born March 13, 1932)

Whitney met Fred Astaire in New York City while the former was a student at Yale University and they became lifelong friends, sharing a passion for horse racing. Whitney became a major investor in two of Astaire's Broadway stage vehicles, The Band Wagon (1930) and Gay Divorce (1932), and played a crucial role in securing for Astaire a contract with RKO Pictures in 1933, using his contacts with Merian C. Cooper; both men were board members of Pan American Airways whose planes were prominently featured in Astaire's breakthrough film with Ginger Rogers: Flying Down to Rio (1933).

During the 1970s, Whitney was listed as one of the ten wealthiest men in the world. The residences at his disposal over the years included an estate on Long Island; an Atlantic Beach, New York, beach house; Greenwood Plantation in Georgia; a townhouse and an elegant apartment in Manhattan; a large summer house on Fishers Island, near New London, Connecticut; a twelve-room house in Saratoga Springs, which the Whitneys used when they attended horse races; a golfing cottage in Augusta, Georgia, where he was a member of the Augusta National Golf Club; and a spacious house Cherry Hill in Virginia Water, Surrey, England, near the Ascot Racecourse. Mr. Whitney also owned an estate in Aiken, South Carolina, which he considered his "retirement" home and where he hoped to spend his final days.

Whitney died on February 8, 1982, at North Shore Hospital, Manhasset, Long Island, after a long illness.

== Philanthropy ==
Payne Whitney made substantial gifts to Yale, to the New York Presbyterian Hospital, and the New York Public Library. After his father's death, the family built the Payne Whitney Gymnasium at Yale in his honor. The family also financed Payne Whitney Psychiatric Clinic at New York Presbyterian Hospital in 1932.

Whitney created the John Hay Whitney Foundation for educational projects in 1946. The foundation provided fellowships to the racially and culturally deprived. He became a major contributor to Yale University, where he served as a Fellow of the corporation.

In 1951, he and his wife Betsey Cushing Whitney donated land from their "Greentree" estate in Manhasset, New York toward the building of North Shore Hospital. Currently called North Shore University Hospital, it is the flagship hospital of the third-largest not-for-profit secular healthcare system in the United States, the North Shore-Long Island Jewish Health System.

In 1953, Whitney received The Hundred Year Association of New York's Gold Medal Award "in recognition of outstanding contributions to the City of New York."

In the late 1960s/early 1970s, John Hay Whitney donated two small parcels of land in Manhasset to the County of Nassau and to the Manhasset-Lakeville Volunteer Fire Department. The Nassau County parcel was the new home for the 6th Police Precinct of the Nassau County Police, located at the S/E intersection of Community Drive and East Community Drive. Just east of the 6th pct, at 2 E Community Dr., the M-LFD parcel was the new home of Fire Company #2 of the M-LFD, where John Hay Whitney was voted in by the membership of Company number two as an Honorary Member of the company.

=== Museum of Modern Art ===
In 1930 Whitney was elected to the board of trustees of the Museum of Modern Art in New York City, and named President of the MoMA Film Library in 1935. In 1941 he succeeded Nelson A. Rockefeller as President of MoMA. In 1946 he succeeded Stephen C. Clark as chairman of the board of trustees

== Art collection ==
When Whitney moved to England as United States ambassador, he took a number of his favourite artworks with him to enjoy during his posting. Before his return to the U.S., he agreed for the first time to loan part of his collection for the public to see. He provided the Tate Gallery with 56 paintings from the collection in England and specially brought in a further 11 paintings from the U.S. The exhibition, the John Hay Whitney Collection, ran from 16 December 1960 to 29 January 1961.

In 1983, the National Gallery of Art, Washington, held an exhibition of the John Hay Whitney Collection with paintings loaned by Whitney's wife, The Museum of Modern Art and the Yale University Art Gallery

Among the paintings in his collection, Whitney's prized possession was the Bal au moulin de la Galette painted in 1876 by the French artist Pierre-Auguste Renoir. In 1990, his widow put the painting up for auction with Sotheby's, New York City and it sold for US$78 million to Japanese businessman Ryoei Saito.

Whitney's widow donated a number of paintings from his collection to the Greentree Foundation. One of those paintings by Pablo Picasso, Garçon à la pipe was auctioned by Sotheby's in May 2004 for $104 million

The following works have been publicly exhibited or sold from the former collection of John Hay Whitney.

- Albert Marquet, The Beach at Trouville
- Alfred de Dreux, Cheval Blanc Effraye Par L'orage
- Alfred de Dreux, Moorish Groom
- André Derain, Charing Cross Bridge
- André Derain, Mountains at Collioure
- Balthus (Balthasar Klossowski): Le Salon
- Jean-Frédéric Bazille: Pots De Fleurs
- Bernard Perlin, Vacant Lots
- Berthe Morisot, Hide and Seek (Cache-Cache)
- Camille Pissarro, Jeanne with Flowers
- Camille Pissarro, Pommes En Fleurs, Temps Gris, Eragny
- Claude Monet, Bateaux Sur Le Galet
- Claude Monet, Camille on the Beach
- Edgar Degas, Avant la Course
- Edgar Degas, Cheval de Selle
- Edgar Degas, Chevaux de Course
- Edgar Degas, La Promenade Des Chevaux
- Edgar Degas, Le faux Depart
- Edgar Degas, Le faux Depart (drawing)
- Edgar Degas, Self Portrait
- Édouard Manet, Les Courses au Bois de Bologne
- Édouard Manet, Woman in a Decollete Gown
- Édouard Vuillard, An Artist
- Édouard Vuillard, Demoiselle en Rouge
- Édouard Vuillard, Embroiders Near a Window (tapestry)
- Édouard Vuillard, La Mère De Vuillard En Profil
- Édouard Vuillard, Portrait of the Artist's Mother
- Edward Hopper, Cape Cod Evening
- Eugène Boudin, Hollyhocks
- Eugène Boudin, Roses
- George Bellows, Club Night
- George Bellows, Crowd at Polo
- George Bellows, Introducing John L. Sullivan
- Georges Braque, Bouteiile et Verre
- Georges Braque, Les Cabines
- Georges Braque, The Port of La Ciotat
- Georges Seurat, Grandcamp, Evening
- Georges Seurat, The Island of La Grande Jatte
- Gustave Courbet, The Hound
- Henri de Toulouse-Lautrec, Marcelle Lender Dancing the Bolero in "Chilperic"
- Henri Fantin-Latour, Roses
- Henri Fantin-Latour, Vase of Flowers
- Henri Matisse, Luxe, Calme et Volupte
- Henri Matisse, Nature Morte au Purro II
- Henri Matisse, Open Window, Collioure
- Henri Rousseau, L'Heureux Quatuor (The Happy Quartet)
- Henri Rousseau, Tropical Forest with Monkeys
- Henri-Edmond Cross, Coast near Antibes
- Henri-Edmond Cross, The Grape Harvest
- Honoré Daumier, Joueurs Des Cartes
- James McNeill Whistler, Wapping on Thames
- Jean-Baptiste-Camille Corot, Chaumieres Et Moulins Au Bord D'un Torrent (Morvan Ou Auvergne)
- Jean-Baptiste-Siméon Chardin, Still Life
- John Constable, View of the back of a terrace of houses at Hampstead, with an elder tree
- John Singer Sargent, Robert Louis Stevenson
- John Singer Sargent, Venetian Courtyard
- Kees van Dongen, Saida
- Maurice de Vlaminck, Tugboat on the Seine, Chatou
- Maurice Utrillo, The Rue des Abbesses, Montmartre
- Odilon Redon, Fleurs Dans Un Vase Vert
- Pablo Picasso, Ace of Clubs
- Pablo Picasso, Garçon à la pipe Le jeune Apprenti
- Pablo Picasso, Head of a Sleeping Woman
- Pablo Picasso, Homme assis (Seated Man)
- Pablo Picasso, Plant de Tomate
- Pablo Picasso, Self Portrait
- Pablo Picasso, Still Life (Le Journal)
- Pablo Picasso, Still Life with a Bottle of Maraschino
- Pablo Picasso, Still Life with Fruit and Glass
- Pablo Picasso, Still Life with Vase, Gourd and Fruit
- Paul Cézanne, Route Tournante a Montgeroult
- Paul Cézanne, Still Life with Curtain, Pitcher and Bowl of Fruit
- Paul Gauguin, Parau-Parau
- Paul Signac, Collioure Le Mohamed-El-Sadok
- Paul Signac, Fishing Boats in the Sunset
- Paul Signac, The Yawl
- Pierre-Auguste Renoir, La Foret de Marly
- Pierre-Auguste Renoir, La Yole
- Pierre-Auguste Renoir, Liseuse
- Pierre-Auguste Renoir, Bal du moulin de la Galette
- Raoul Dufy, Beach at Saint-Adresse
- Raoul Dufy, Fete a Sainte-Adresse
- Raoul Dufy, Jockeys et Turfistes a Epso
- Raoul Dufy, Sailboats at Le Havre
- Roger de La Fresnaye, Still Life, Coffee, Pot and Melon
- Rufino Tamayo, Women
- Sir Alfred Munnings, Before the Start
- Sir Alfred Munnings, Leaving the Paddock at Epsom Downs
- Sir Alfred Munnings, The Red Prince Mare
- Sir Alfred Munnings, The Winner
- Sir John Lavery, Weighing in at Sandown Park
- Théo van Rysselberghe, Port Cette
- Théodore Géricault, Cheval de Napoleon
- Théodore Géricault, Officier de Cavalerie à Cheval
- Théodore Rousseau, The Isle of Capri
- Thomas Eakins, Baby at Play
- Thomas Eakins, The Oarsmen
- Vincent van Gogh, Les Oliviers, St Remy
- Vincent van Gogh, Self Portrait
- William Blake, The Good and Evil Angels Struggling for Possession of a Child
- Winslow Homer, Woodshopper in the Adirondacks
- Fosburgh, Daisies

Sources: John Hay Whitney Collection (Catalogue), Tate Gallery, 1960, John Hay Whitney Collection (Catalogue), National Gallery of Art, 1983, Sotheby's Catalogue, auction 10 May 1999, Sotheby's Catalogue, auction 5 May 2004

== Anecdotes ==
- Whitney gave Fred Astaire a pair of big-wheel roller skates as a present. A few years later, roller skating was one of his most important dance numbers on film.
- Whitney and Jimmy Altemus provided the lyrics for a sing composed by Fred Astaire, "Tappin' the Time".
- President Dwight D. Eisenhower took pains to transmit to Ambassador Whitney in London, by telegram, the first-round golf scores of the Masters Tournament at the Augusta National Golf Club on 5 April 1957.
- As ambassador, Whitney had a very demanding and exhausting schedule but was not fazed by it. After having been to three or four receptions one day, his wife was not surprised to find their chauffeur, groggy from his rounds, dozing on the back seat of their limousine and the ambassador driving the car.
- Whitney: "I have just had a heart attack and am on a very strict diet. However if you will twist my arm a little, I will probably give in and we will consume a number of very large dry martinis"
- William S. Paley (the founder of CBS), who was Whitney's brother-in-law, had a gentle rivalry with Whitney. Once while watching television with Whitney at Greentree, Paley wanted to change the channel. 'Where's your clicker?', Paley asked, figuring Jock would have a remote-control switch at his fingertips. Jock calmly pressed a buzzer, and his butler walked up to the television set to make the switch.
- The White House Is Nice, But It's No Greentree! E. J. Kahn, Whitney's biographer, reported that one of Whitney's daughters, Kate, once took her own children on a tour of the White House. Mr. Kahn wrote, After inspecting it, they pronounced it nice enough but hardly on a par with Greentree. [Greentree was the more prestigious of his Long Island residences.]
