= Hurley, New Mexico =

- Town
- Nickname: Brindley Town
- Location of Hurley, New Mexico

- Location in the United States
- Coordinates: 32°42′05″N 108°07′38″W
- Country: United States
- State: New Mexico
- County: Grant

Area
  - Total: 1.02 sq mi (2.65 km^{2})
  - Land: 1.02 sq mi (2.64 km^{2})
  - Water: 0.0039 sq mi (0.01 km^{2})
- Elevation: 5,716 ft (1,742 m)

Population (2020)
  - Total: 1,256
  - Density: 1,231.2/sq mi (475.35/km^{2})
- Time zone: UTC-7 (Mountain (MST))
  - Summer (DST): UTC-6 (MDT)
- ZIP code: 88043
- Area code: 575
- FIPS code: 35-33850
- GNIS feature ID: 2412784
- Website: www.townofhurley.us

Hurley is a town in Grant County, New Mexico, United States. As of the 2020 census, Hurley had a population of 1,256.

== Geography ==
Hurley is located in east-central Grant County. U.S. Route 180 passes through the town, leading north 4 miles (6 km) to Bayard, and southeast 38 miles (61 km) to Deming and Interstate 10.

The Grant County Airport and the hamlet and ranch of Apache Tejo are approximately three miles south of Hurley.

The large, open pit Chino Mine and its related facilities lie just to the east of Hurley.

According to the United States Census Bureau, the town has a total area of 1.02 square miles (2.65 km^{2}), of which 0.004 square miles (0.01 km^{2}), or 0.36%, is water.

== Demographics ==
Historical population
Census	Pop.	Note	%±
1950	2,079		—
1960	1,851		−11.0%
1970	1,796		−3.0%
1980	1,616		−10.0%
1990	1,534		−5.1%
2000	1,464		−4.6%
2010	1,297		−11.4%
2020	1,256		−3.2%
U.S. Decennial Census

As of the census of 2000, there were 1,464 people, 563 households, and 407 families residing in the town. The population density was 1,433.0 inhabitants per square mile (553.3/km^{2}). There were 650 housing units at an average density of 636.2 per square mile (245.6/km^{2}). The racial makeup of the town was 71.79% White, 0.14% African American, 2.05% Native American, 0.07% Asian, 23.43% from other races, and 2.53% from two or more races. Hispanic or Latino of any race were 60.31% of the population.

There were 563 households, out of which 29.5% had children under the age of 18 living with them, 53.1% were married couples living together, 13.9% had a female householder with no husband present, and 27.7% were non-families. 23.8% of all households were made up of individuals, and 13.0% had someone living alone who was 65 years of age or older. The average household size was 2.60 and the average family size was 3.08.

In the town, the population was spread out, with 26.5% under the age of 18, 8.2% from 18 to 24, 22.0% from 25 to 44, 24.2% from 45 to 64, and 19.1% who were 65 years of age or older. The median age was 38 years. For every 100 females, there were 92.1 males. For every 100 females age 18 and over, there were 85.2 males.

The median income for a household in the town was $27,404, and the median income for a family was $31,181. Males had a median income of $29,667 versus $16,528 for females. The per capita income for the town was $11,999. About 14.4% of families and 15.6% of the population were below the poverty line, including 23.4% of those under age 18 and 8.8% of those age 65 or over.

== Popular culture ==
Scenes from the action Western film The Lone Ranger were filmed in locations around Hurley.

== See also ==
- List of municipalities in New Mexico
