= Chino mine =

Copper mine in New Mexico, United States

Santa Rita Mine; Chino Mine
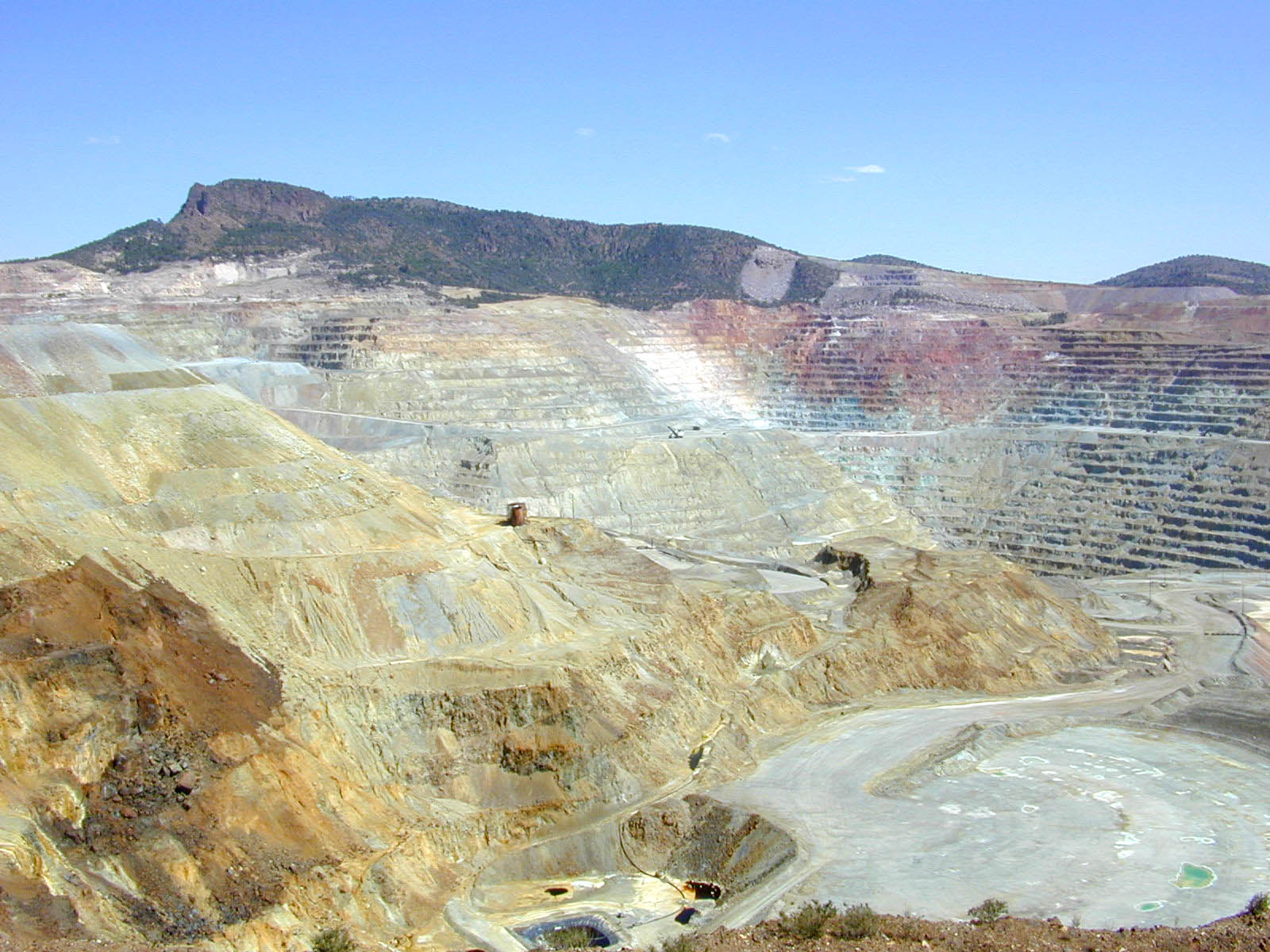
- Chino mine in 2003

- Location in New Mexico
- Location: Santa Rita, New Mexico; 32°47′30″N 108°04′02″W
- Products: Copper
- Opened: 1909
- Company: Freeport-McMoRan Inc.
- Website: Official website

The Chino Mine ("Chino" is Spanish for the "Chinese"), also known as the Santa Rita mine or Santa Rita del Cobre, is an American open-pit porphyry copper mine located in the town of Santa Rita, New Mexico 15 miles (24 km) east of Silver City. The mine was started as the Chino Copper Company in 1909 by mining engineer John M. Sully and Spencer Penrose, and is currently owned and operated by Freeport-McMoRan Inc. subsidiaries. The area where the mine is located is at an average elevation of 5,699 feet (1,737 m).

Apaches, Spaniards, Mexicans, and Americans have all obtained native copper and copper ore from this site. The present-day open-pit mining operation was begun in 1910. It is the third oldest active open pit copper mine in the world after the Bingham Canyon Mine and Chuquicamata .

== History ==
An Apache Indian showed Spanish officer Lt. Colonel Jose Manuel Carrasco the site of the Chino mine in 1800. Carrasco recognized the rich copper deposits and began mining, but lacked the expertise to exploit the copper. He sold the Santa Rita del Cobre mine, as he had named it, to Francisco Manuel de EIguea in 1804 who imported convict labor to work the mine and build a fort (presidio) to house the convicts and protect them from the Apache. The miners sent pack trains of mules loaded with copper to Chihuahua. Americans Sylvester Pattie, James Kirker, and Robert McKnight managed the mine in the 1820s and 1830s. Partners Robert McKnight and Stephen Courcier took possession of “El Cobre,” (Santa Rita del Cobre mine) in 1828 and worked the property until 1834. McKnight and Courcier profited greatly from the rich copper mining operation and amassed a large fortune from it.

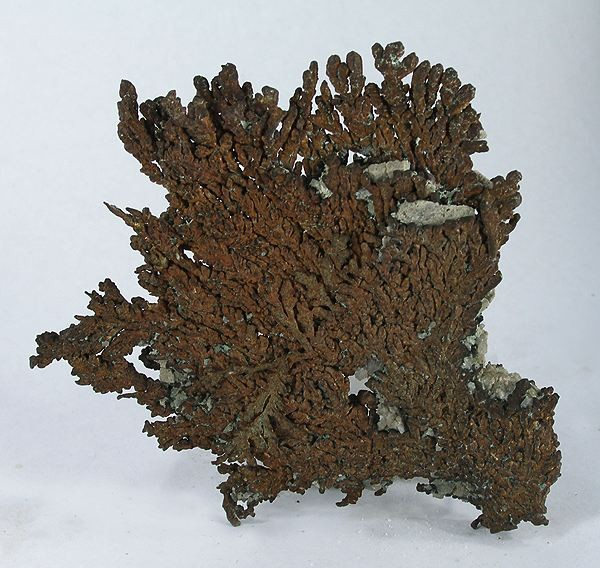
Native copper from Chino (size: 11.2 x 9.3 x 0.4 cm). Chino is well known among mineral collectors for its many native-copper specimens

Santa Rita was located in the heart of Apache country and was plagued by Apache raids. Historians often state that an infamous massacre of Apache by John Johnson in 1837 took place at Santa Rita, although it is more likely that the incident took place further south, near the Animas Mountains. (See Apache-Mexico Wars) Johnson's attack incited rather than intimidated the Apache. Mangas Coloradas and his followers were especially menacing. Twenty-two fur trappers were killed nearby, and the mine was cut off from supplies. In 1838, the 300 to 400 inhabitants of Santa Rita fled south toward the presidio at Janos, Chihuahua, 150 miles away, but the Apache killed nearly all of them en route. After that, Santa Rita was only occasionally operational until 1873 when Apache chief Cochise signed a peace agreement with the US and the mine was reopened. Apache raids in the area continued until 1886 when Geronimo surrendered.

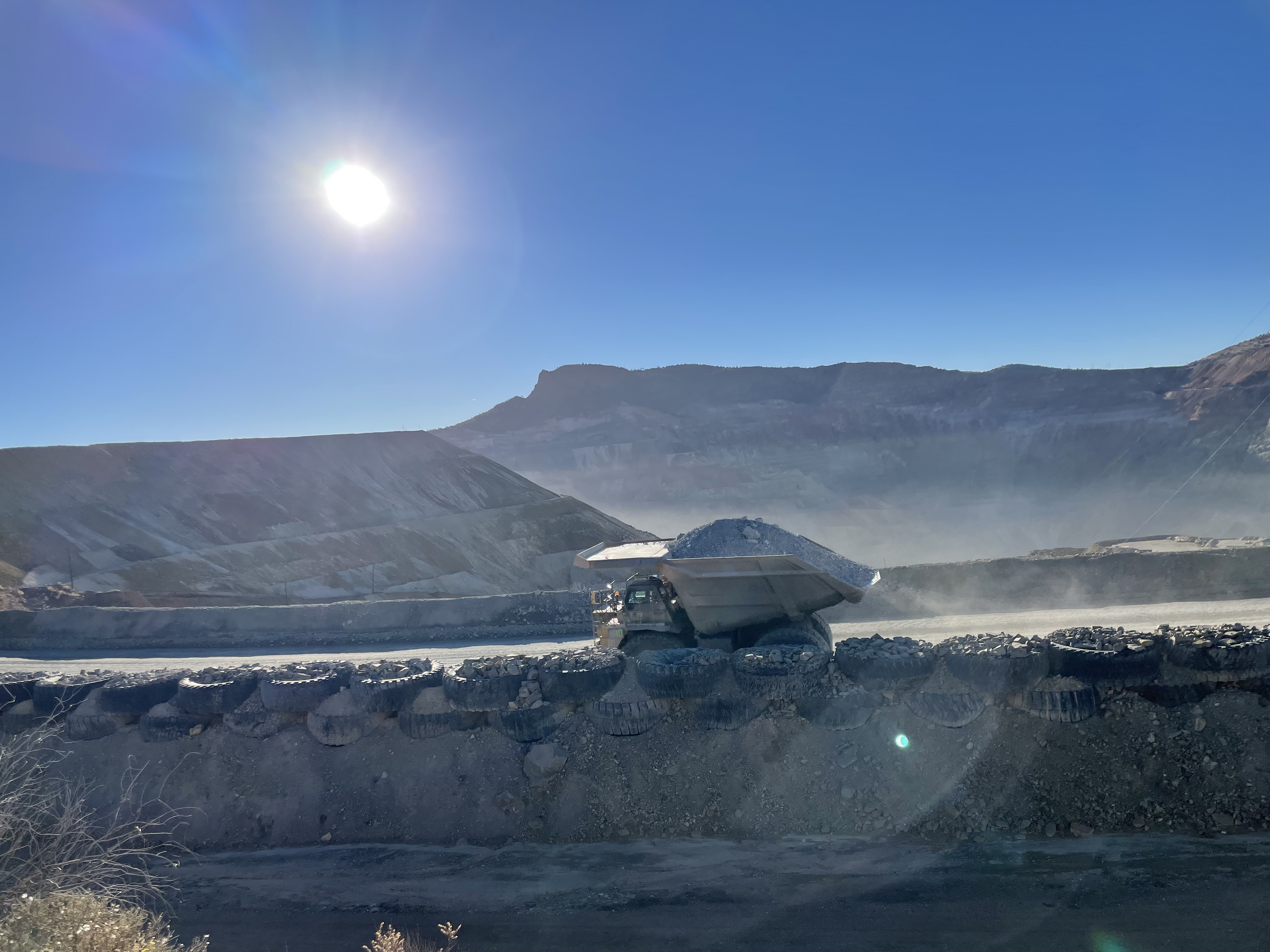
Massive dump truck, Chino Mine, 2021

A mill to process the low-grade copper ore was established in 1911 in nearby Hurley but was replaced by a new (current) Ivanhoe concentrator facility in 1982. Milling operations restarted in January 2004 at the Chino Concentrator after a three-year hiatus caused by low copper prices. Solvent extraction and electrowinning (SX/EW) operations started in 1988 and have run continuously since. Reserves of copper ore at Chino are expected to last until 2015.

A smelter in Hurley was commissioned in 1939 and was modernized in 1985 to increase capacity and achieve compliance with the Clean Air Act. In 2005, the smelter was permanently closed.

== Current operations ==
In 2008, Chino's parent company, Freeport-McMoRan, announced that it planned to suspend mining and milling activities at Chino, but would continue reclamation activities and copper production from its SX/EW plant. About 600 people from the work force of 830 would be laid off beginning about Feb. 13, 2009. The mine reopened in 2011. As of January 2014, the operations employed approximately 1,035 people.
