= Santa Rita, New Mexico =

19th and 20th century copper mine ghost town

Coordinates: 32°48′13″N 108°03′39″W

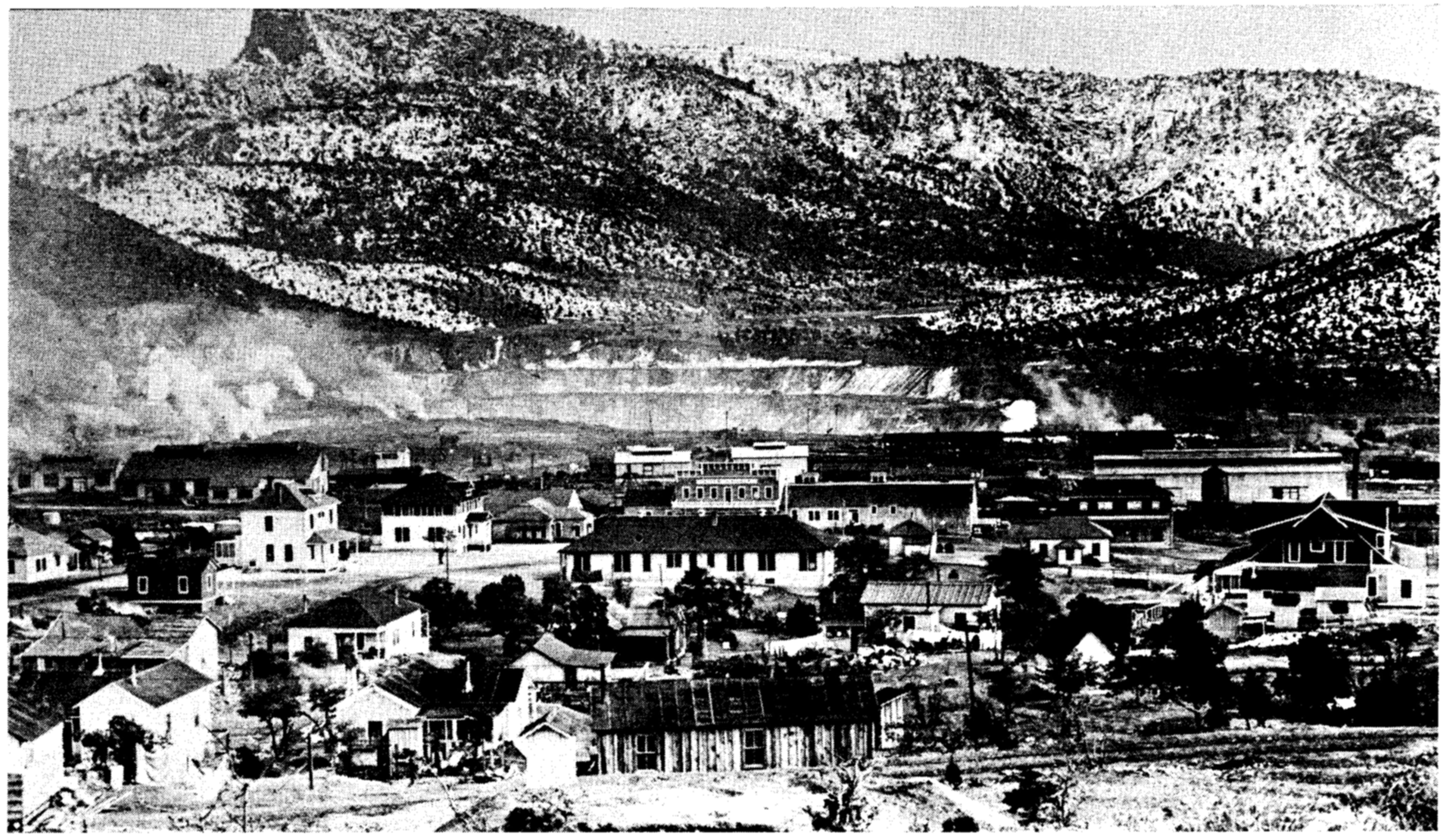
Santa Rita in 1919 with mine in background

Santa Rita is a ghost town in Grant County in the U.S. state of New Mexico. The site of Chino copper mine, Santa Rita was located fifteen miles (24 km) east of Silver City.

== History ==
Copper mining in the area began late in the Spanish colonial period, but it was not until 1803 that Franscisco Manuel Elguea, a Chihuahua banker and businessman, founded the town of Santa Rita. He named it Santa Rita del Cobre (Saint Rita of the Copper), after Saint Rita of Cascia and the existing mine. During the early 19th century the mine produced over 6 million pounds (2.7 million kg) of copper annually. The crudely smelted ore was shipped to Chihuahua for further smelting and then sent to Mexico City on mule back. Americans Sylvester Pattie, James Kirker, and Robert McKnight managed the mine in the 1820s and 1830s. Partners Robert McKnight and Stephen Courcier took possession of "El Cobre", (Santa Rita del Cobre mine) in 1828 and worked the property until 1834. McKnight and Courcier profited greatly from the rich copper mining operation and amassed a large fortune from it.

The area was relatively peaceful, despite an occasional attack from the Warm Springs (Mimbres) band of the Chiricahua Apache, who lived nearby at the headwaters of the Gila and Mimbres rivers.

In 1837, however, an American trader named John Johnson lured the Apaches to a gathering and then massacred them to sell their scalps for the bounty offered by the Mexican government. Johnson's massacre inflamed the Apache rather than intimidated them. The rich Santa Rita copper mine in New Mexico was a principal target of Mangas Coloradas and his followers. In 1838, 22 fur trappers were killed nearby and the Apache severed the mine's supply line. The 300 to 400 inhabitants of Santa Rita fled south toward the Janos presidio, 150 miles (240 km) away, but the Apache killed nearly all of them en route. Afterwards, the Santa Rita mine was only occasionally in operation until 1873, when Apache chief Cochise signed a peace agreement with the U.S. and the mine was reopened.

Martin B. Hayes reopened the mine. However, the town continued to be subject to Apache attacks from Geronimo, Victorio and other Apache warleaders until 1886, when Geronimo surrendered for the last time. A post office opened in 1881 and the coming of the railroad five years later spurred further development of the mine.

After the Santa Rita mine was converted to an open pit in 1901, the town was forced to move several times as the pit grew. Shortly after the town relocated in 1957, heavy rains washed boulders and mud into the new townsite. The town was abandoned once and for all in 1967, and the school system for the area was discontinued in 1972.

The population of Santa Rita was about 500 in 1884. By 1915 it was 2,500, and by 1920 had reached 6,000. It remained at 6,000, until significant layoffs at the mine started in the 1950s.

== Notable people ==
- Jimmy Bowen (b. 1937), singer and record producer
- Ralph Kiner (1922–2014), National Baseball Hall of Fame Major League Baseball player and broadcaster. Kiner's number 4 is retired by the Pittsburgh Pirates, and the New York Mets honored Kiner's broadcasting career by depicting a microphone, along with his name and displayed them on the left-field wall.
- William Harrell Nellis (1916–1944), was a United States fighter pilot who flew 70 World War II combat missions. Nellis Air Force Base was named after him
- Harrison Schmitt (b. 1935), geologist, Apollo 17 astronaut and moonwalker, U.S. Senator for New Mexico, 1977-1983

== See also ==
- List of ghost towns in New Mexico
