= Benzion Miller =

Polish-born American cantor (1947–2025)

Benzion Miller (Hebrew: בֶּן צִיּוֹן מילר, Yiddish: בֶּן־צִיּוֹן מי(ל)לעֶר; 8 December 1947 – 3 February 2025) was a German-born American cantor, schochet (kosher slaughterer) and mohel (circumciser).

== Early life and career ==
Miller was born in a displaced persons camp in Fernwald, Germany.

Miller's singing career began at the age of five. Miller studied music theory and solfège under Cantor Samuel B. Taube of Montreal. He studied voice production at the Champagne School for Music in Montreal and with Dr. Puggell, cantor Avshalom Zfira, and Allan Bowers. As an interpreter of liturgical music, Benzion Miller sang an operatic repertoire as well as Jewish and Chassidic folk music. He appeared with the Israeli Philharmonic Orchestra, the Jerusalem Symphony, the Rishon L'Tzion Symphony, the Haifa Symphony and members of the London Symphony. He also recorded for the Milken Archive, in Barcelona, Spain with the Barcelona National Symphony Orchestra.

Miller was among the first group of cantors to visit and sing in Eastern European countries after World War II. He appeared before capacity audiences in Romania, Russia, Poland and Hungary, where he sang with the Budapest State Opera Orchestra. Miller made many recordings of liturgical, Chassidic and Yiddish music.

Miller held positions in Montreal at Sheves Achim Synagogue on Côte-des-Neiges, then in Toronto at Shaarei Tefillah Synagogue on Bathurst Street, in Canada. In 1981 he became cantor of Temple Beth El of Borough Park in Brooklyn, a pulpit served by Mordechai Hershman, Berele Chagy and Moshe Koussevitzky, and continued as cantor of the synagogue, now Congregation Young Israel Beth El, after its merger with Young Israel of Boro Park.

Miller made an appearance in A Cantor's Tale, a documentary about Jackie Mendelson. Miller and Mendelson are shown greeting each other and briefly engaging in conversation.

== Personal life and death ==
Benzion's father, cantor, schochet and mohel Aaron Daniel Miller, was born in the Jewish community of Oświęcim (Yiddish: Oshpitsin, German: Auschwitz) in Poland. Aaron, his father and grandfather were cantors at the Bobover courts. Aaron's wife and children were murdered in Nazi concentration camps. Aaron met Benzion's mother, who was from the Belz hasidic dynasty, after the war in a displaced persons camp in Munich, Germany.

Benzion's son, cantor Shimmy Miller, was his choral director and they often performed duets with each other.

Miller had five children; three daughters and two sons. He died on 3 February 2025, at the age of 77.

== Partial Discography ==
1. "Cantor Benzion Miller Sings Cantorial Concert Masterpieces" – The Milken Archive of Jewish Music, Naxos (18 May 2004; International: January 2005)
2. "HASC – Jerusalem The Experience" (2004)
3. "High Holidays" (1997)
4. "Shabbat" (1995)
5. "I Believe" (אני מאמין)
6. "The Soul Is Yours"
7. "The Two In Harmony"
8. "America, my wonderland" (אַמעריקע מײַן ווּנדערלאַנד)

== See also ==
- Hazzan
- Jewish Culture Festival in Kraków
