= Milken Archive of Jewish Music =

American Jewish music archive

Coordinates: 34.0178°N 118.4972°W

The Milken Archive of Jewish Music is a collection of material about the history of Jewish music in the United States. It contains roughly 700 recorded musical works, 800 hours of oral histories, 50,000 photographs and historical documents, an extensive collection of program notes and essays, and thousands of hours of video footage documenting recording sessions, interviews, and live performances.

== History ==
The Archive was founded in 1990 by businessman Lowell Milken, with the stated mission to "document, preserve, and disseminate the vast body of music that pertains to the American Jewish experience." It was originally established as the Milken Family Archive of 20th Century American Jewish Music, with composer Michael Isaacson as its artistic director In 1993, Neil W. Levin of the Jewish Theological Seminary of America became the artistic director and the Archive became known as the Milken Archive of American Jewish music. Between 2003 and 2006, it released a series of 50 CDs on the Naxos label, which have sold nearly 300,000 copies. In 2005, producer David Frost was awarded the Grammy Award for Producer of the Year, Classical, for five of the albums in this series. At present, the Archive's website serves as the primary vehicle for the Archive’s music, and the access point for its other media. The material is organized into 20 thematic groups.

== Media coverage ==
In its remembrance of Dave Brubeck after his December 5, 2012, passing, PBS Newshour featured footage of the Dave Brubeck Quartet playing "Take Five" at a 2007 Milken Archive concert and recording session in Bryn Mawr, Pennsylvania.

Milken Archive footage of Dave Brubeck was featured in the documentary Dave Brubeck: In His Own Sweet Way directed by Clint Eastwood that aired on December 6, 2010, on Turner Classic Movies.

In September 2010, Milken Archive artistic director Neil Levin was featured on televisions stations across the United States in the documentary 18 Voices Sing Kol Nidre discussing the Kol Nidre, a declaration recited or sung in the synagogue before the beginning of the evening service on every Yom Kippur.

On May 26, 2010, the NPR program All Things Considered featured Milken Archive music in its broadcast about clarinetist David Krakauer, "Abraham Inc.: Klezmer with a funky hip hop beat."

== Volumes ==
The Milken Archive's collection is organized according to the following 20 thematic groups, known as volumes. As of May 2013, the Archive released 16 of the 20 volumes.

1. Jewish Voices in the New World: The Song of Prayer in Colonial and 19th-Century America
2. A Garden Eastward: Sephardi and Near Eastern Inspiration
3. Seder T'fillot: Traditional and Contemporary Synagogue Services
4. Cycle of Life in Synagogue and Home: Prayers and Celebrations Throughout the Jewish Year
5. The Classical Klezmer: Rebirth of a Folk Tradition
6. Echoes of Ecstasy: Hassidic Inspiration
7. Masterworks of Prayer: Art in Worship
8. Sing Unto Zion! In Praise of a Jewish National Home
9. The Art of Jewish Song: Yiddish and Hebrew
10. Intimate Voices: Solo and Ensemble Music of Jewish Spirit
11. Symphonic Visions: Orchestral Works of Jewish Spirit
12. Legends of Toil and Celebration: Songs of Jewish Solidarity, Social Awareness, and Jewish Americana
13. Great Songs of the American Yiddish Stage: Yiddish Theater, Vaudeville, Radio, and Film
14. Golden Voices in the Golden Land: The Great Age of Cantorial Art in America
15. Swing His Praises: Jazz, Blues, and Rock in the Service of God
16. Heroes and Heroines: Jewish Opera
17. Odes and Epics: Dramatic Music of Jewish Experience
18. Psalms and Canticles: Jewish Choral Art in America
19. Out of the Whirlwind: Musical Reflections of the Holocaust
20. L'dor vador: A Celebration of Children’s Voices

== Composers ==
The Milken Archive has recorded or licensed music by the following composers:

- Joseph Achron
- Hugo Adler
- Samuel Adler
- Bruce Adolphe
- Aminadav Aloni
- Israel Alter
- David Amram
- Solomon Ancis
- Daniel Asia
- C. Attenhofer
- Aaron Avshalomov
- Morris Barash
- Steve Barnett
- Robert Beaser
- Sidor Belarsky
- Ofer Ben-Amots
- Paul Ben-Haim
- Aaron Bensoussan
- Jean Berger
- Irving Berlin
- Herman Berlinski
- Leonard Bernstein
- Thomas Beveridge
- Abraham Binder
- Ernest Bloch
- William Bogzester
- Victoria Bond
- Yehezkel Braun
- Martin Bresnick
- Murray Brody
- Dave Brubeck
- Samuel Bugatch
- Shlomo Carlebach
- Mario Castelnuovo-Tedesco
- Julius Chajes
- Gerald Cohen
- Gustave Cohen
- Aaron Copland
- Doug Cotler
- Charles Davidson
- Mario Davidovsky
- A. J. Davis
- Paul Dessau
- David Diamond
- Paul Discount
- Rubin Doctor
- Jacob Druckman
- Haim Elisha
- Abraham Ellstein
- Shaye Englehardt
- Charles Feldman
- Irving Fine
- Vivian Fine
- Meir Finkelstein
- Lukas Foss
- Dan Frohman
- Herbert Fromm
- Moshe Ganchoff
- Mordechai Gebirtig
- Michl Gelbart
- Miriam Gideon
- Louis Gilrod
- Leib Glantz
- Philip Glass
- Abraham Goldfaden
- Rabbi Israel Goldfarb
- Maurice Goldman
- Jack Goldstein
- Raymond Goldstein
- Osvaldo Golijov
- Solomon Golub
- Jack Gottlieb
- Jacob Gottlieb
- Morton Gould
- S. Gozinsky
- Max Graumann
- Helen Greenberg
- Todros Greenberg
- Emily Gresser
- Roy Harris
- Vladimir Heifetz
- Max Helfman
- Jerry Herman
- Joel Hoffman
- Michael Horvit
- Michael Isaacson
- Frederick Jacobi
- Max Janowski
- Pinchos Jassinowsky
- Tzipora Jochsberger
- Oscar Julius
- Alois Kaiser
- Sholom Kalib
- Martin Kalmanoff
- Isaac Kaminsky
- Fischel Kanapoff
- Abraham Kaplan
- Adolph Katchko
- Aaron Kernis
- Gershon Kingsley
- Frederick Kitziger
- Jonathan Klein
- Jeff Klepper
- Henech Kon
- Jerome Kopmar
- Erich Korngold
- Moshe Koussevitzky
- Leo Kraft
- Leon Kramer
- Meyer Kupferman
- David Kusevitsky
- Ezra Laderman
- Paul Lamkoff
- Marc Lavry
- Henri Lazarof
- Benjamin Lees
- Marvin Levy
- Jorge Liderman
- Joshua Lind
- Leo Low
- Will Macfarlane
- Meyer Machtenberg
- Samuel Malavsky
- Ursula Mamlok
- Mana-Zucca
- Jakov Medvedieff
- Henry Mendes
- David Meyerowitz
- Jan Meyerowitz
- Darius Milhaud
- Aaron Miller
- Issachar Miron
- Douglas Moore
- Richard Neumann
- Alexander Olshanetsky
- Leo Ornstein
- Charles Osborne
- Moishe Oysher
- Thomas Pasatieri
- Arnold Perlmutter & Herman Wohl
- Frederick Piket
- Pierre Pinchik
- Sergei Prokofiev
- Jan Radzynski
- Shulamit Ran
- Jacob Rappaport
- Karol Rathaus
- Maurice Rauch
- Steve Reich
- Stephen Richards
- Sid Robinovitch
- George Rochberg
- David Roitman
- Emanuel Rosenberg
- Yossele Rosenblatt
- Morris Rosenzweig
- Salomone Rossi/Freed
- Bruce Roter
- Joseph Rumshinsky
- Frederic Rzewski
- Lazare Saminsky
- Mordecai Sandberg
- Jacob Sandler
- Simon Sargon
- Nicholas Saslavsky
- Heinrich Schalit
- Walter Scharf
- David Schiff
- Benjie Schiller
- Sigmund Schlesinger
- Ralph Schlossberg
- Arnold Schoenberg
- Paul Schoenfield
- Ruth Schonthal
- Israel Schorr
- William Schuman
- Abe Schwartz
- Gerard Schwarz
- Sholom Secunda
- Harold Shapero
- Ralph Shapey
- Michael Shapiro
- William Sharlin
- Judith Shatin
- Ben Zion Shenker
- Nathaniel Shilkret
- Solomon Shmulowitz
- Bonia Shur
- Elie Siegmeister
- Mark Silver
- Sheila Silver
- Moses Silverman
- Leo Smit
- Ray Smolover
- Robbie Solomon
- Max Spicker & William Sparger
- Robert Starer
- Edward Stark
- Leon Stein
- Robert Stern
- David Stock
- Robert Strassburg
- Igor Stravinsky
- David Tamkin
- Alexandre Tansman
- Craig Taubman
- Aaron Tishkowsky
- Ernst Toch
- Ilia Trilling
- Joelle Wallach
- Donald Waxman
- Franz Waxman
- C. Weber
- Kurt Weill
- Jacob Weinberg
- Lazar Weiner
- Hugo Weisgall
- David Werdiger
- Richard Wernick
- Juliusz Wolfsohn
- Stefan Wolpe
- Yehudi Wyner
- Herman Yablokoff
- Judith Zaimont
- Herman Zalis
- Eric Zeisl
- Alexander Zemlinsky
- Zavel Zilberts
- Solomon Zim
- John Zorn
