= Knowledge Universe =

American educational services company

Knowledge Universe was an American educational services company that was founded by Michael Milken and existed from 1996 to 2015. The stated goal of the company was to improve the formation of human capital through better education. Knowledge Universe comprised around fifty companies that it either acquired outright or owned a significant share of. The largest portion of Knowledge Universe was the Knowledge Learning Corporation, which included Children's Discovery Centers, Aramark Educational Resources and the Children's World Learning Centers, and the KinderCare Learning Centers. Other subsidiaries of Knowledge Universe included Bookman Testing Services, the CRT Group, LeapFrog, and Nextera Enterprises. Parts of Knowledge Universe were gradually sold off until in 2015 there was essentially none of it left.

== Origins ==
Knowledge Universe was founded in 1996 by the American financier and 'junk bonds king' Michael Milken, a few years after completing a prison term for securities fraud. It was one of several educational or charitable endeavors he embarked upon after his release, including the Milken Family Foundation. A co-founder was his brother, Lowell Milken; the two combined for an initial $250 million investment in the entity. The third founder was Larry Ellison, the chief executive of Oracle Corporation; Ellison invested another $250 million, but remained a largely passive partner. Knowledge Universe was closely held.

Milken remained a polarizing figure at the time, and as a company, Knowledge Universe kept a relatively low profile. Those aware of the new venture viewed it with some skepticism, both due to resistance in some quarters to for-profit education and due to the belief that it was a vehicle with which Milken could rehabilitate his image. For better or worse, Milken was seen as trying to do the same thing for education by way of private ventures that he had done for capital formation by way of junk bonds. On his part, Milken stressed the importance of human capital as a percentage of national wealth and thus the importance of education in generating human capital. "Doing good is good business," he said at the time.

By 1998, two years after its formation, Knowledge Universe was one of the largest firms in the educational services industry, and was also considered an educational technology company. Making a number of acquisitions, it contained a variety of different companies across the education, training, and consulting domains. Its focus ranged from the youngest children through to experienced professionals and on to post-retirement.

Other companies in this space at this time included DeVry and CBT Systems, as well as Sylvan Learning and Learning Tree International.

== Corporate leadership ==
By 1999, the president of Knowledge Universe was Tom Kalinske, an executive who had come over with the acquisition of LeapFrog Enterprises.

In 2003, the Milken brothers became the sole owners of the company. Michael Milken remained chairman of the company. Lowell Milken served as chairman of Knowledge Universe Education Holdings Inc.

== Component companies ==
From its early times, Knowledge Universe was a collection of number of different companies that it either acquired outright or owned a large share of. These included: Bookman Testing Services, Children's Discovery Centers, CRT Group, LeapFrog , MindQ Publishing, Nextera Enterprises, Nobel Education Dynamics, and Point Productivity International.

More were added later. Soon, Knowledge Universe had a complex structure consisting of some fifty constituent companies, some fully owned, some partially, and with some interlocking relationships among those subsidiaries.

By 2007, Knowledge Universe had over 10,000 employees across those fifty companies.

=== Bookman Testing Services ===
Bookman Testing Services was a New York-based company founded by Harvey Bookman, that began under that name in 1987. It was known for its TeckChek brand of adaptive assessment tests that were used to screen candidates for employment in the computer industry. These tests began with one Bookman created for the COBOL programming language. Tests followed for other languages such as IBM 370 Assembly language, Ada, C++, and Java, and also for framework and database technologies such as CICS, DB2, PowerBuilder, and Visual Basic. Test questions were created and reviewed by contracted subject-matter experts and fit within Bookman's testing framework. With over a hundred such subject tests, Bookman had many large enterprises and organizations as customers.

Characterized by The Boston Globe as "perhaps the best-known computer-based testing company", Bookman was acquired by Knowledge Universe in 1998, and made part of the firm's Knowledge Testing Enterprises subsidiary. In 2005, TeckChek was relaunched as a service of a new entity, International Knowledge Measurement (IKM), which was a subsidiary of Krest LLC, which was in turn another entity associated with Knowledge Universe. Then in 2016, IKM was acquired by Spiegel Partners, and TeckChek continued on into the 2020s.

=== CRT Group ===
CRT Group was a public company based in the United Kingdom that did training and temporary staffing. Knowledge Universe acquired a majority stake in it for $169 million in 1996, after which the CRT Group stock price tripled, reaching a high of 491p in 1998. CRT Group was renamed to Spring Group Plc at that point.

However the fortunes of Spring Group underwent a long decline, eventually falling to 20p until in 2009 it was sold to Adecco.

=== Nextera Enterprises ===
Nextera Enterprises was the consulting subsidiary of Knowledge Enterprises. It was in part an umbrella entity that incorporated other acquisitions, of which were included Pyramid Imaging, a software development firm; Sigma Consulting, Symmetrix Inc., and Planning Technologies Group, all consulting firms of one type or another; and TEC Worldwide, which did training at the chief executive level. Another acquisition was that of Lexecon for $60 million in 1999. The connection between Lexecon and educational was not so apparent, but as the Wall Street Journal wrote, it bore "old ties to the dethroned junk-bond king and a long record of championing free-market theory in high-stakes litigation." In any case, the goal of Nextera was to make acquisitions quickly, then go public.

Lexecon would be sold to FTI Consulting in 2003.

=== LeapFrog ===
Knowledge Universe made a $50 million investment into the educational toy company LeapFrog, thereby gaining a controlling interest in it. Some of LeapFrog's educational items were used at the learning centers run by the Riordan Foundation.

LeapFrog staged an IPO in 2002, with its opening price of $13 a share later getting over $45 a share, but by 2004 the company was in trouble and had a change of executive leadership. By the 2010s it was facing delisting; in 2016, it was sold for $1 a share to VTech Holdings Limited.

=== Knowledge Learning Corporation ===
In 1998, Knowledge Universe acquired Children's Discovery Centers, a chain of day care centers, and renamed it Knowledge Learning Corporation. The acquisition cost $100 million. Knowledge Learning Corporation was based in San Rafael, California, and its CEO was Thomas Heymann. By another account, Children's Discovery Centers was renamed to Knowledge Beginnings Inc. Or, by still another account, the acquiring entity was known as Knowledge Universe Learning Group, which in turn in 1999 initiated Knowledge Beginnings.

In any case, in 2003, Knowledge Learning Corporation acquired Aramark Educational Resources and its Children's World Learning Centers for $265 million, as well as the Medallion onsite and before- and after-school programs for elementary school students. In 2004, KLC purchased EdSolutions, a leading provider of Supplemental Educational Services (SES) before- and after-school programs for 2,300 children in four states, which then merged with Medallion to form the KLC School Partnerships division.

=== KinderCare ===
In 2004, Knowledge Universe announced that it would acquire, through its Knowledge Learning Corporation division, the KinderCare Learning Centers, a group of preschool and child care centers that was based in Portland, Oregon. By coincidence, KinderCare had a past association with Milken, as it had received junk bond financing via Milken and Drexel Burnham in the 1970s. The KinderCare deal, valued at over $1 billion, made Knowledge Learning Corporation the nation's largest private child care and education provider. The transaction closed in 2005.

By 2011, Knowledge Universe was one of Oregon's largest privately held companies and a large employer in the Portland metro area. Indeed, the company headquarters were now in Portland. Executive leadership was based out of the Portland National Support Center for Knowledge Universe. The chief executive of the U.S. company was Felicia Thornton, as Milken did not have operational responsibility.

In the United States, Knowledge Universe Education Holdings Inc. became the largest early childhood education company. It operated under the KinderCare Learning Centers, Knowledge Beginnings, Children’s Creative Learning Centers, The Grove School, Champions, and Cambridge Schools brands. Internationally, it oversaw early childhood education, K-12 education, and post-secondary education programs and on a global basis was headquartered in Singapore.

By 2013, Knowledge Universe the number of child care centers overall that the company was running was around 1,700 in number. Most of these were in KinderCare, but they also had ones under the other monikers. The company was private not just in financial structure but in transparency terms as well, and did not state where its teacher pay ranked nor what employee turnover was like.

=== Other subsidiaries ===
MindQ Publishing and Productivity Point International were technology learning firms, both of which focused on training for IT professionals.

Nobel Learning, also known as Nobel Education Dynamics, was an educational concern based in Pennsylvania that Knowledge Universe bought a 20 percent interest in.

An entity providing online education, Knowledge University, was begun in 1997.

== End ==
As early as 2007, Milken had been looking to sell a $1 billion stake in Knowledge Universe.

The company suffered financially in the wake of the Great Recession of the late 2000s. In 2012, company revenues were about $1.45 billion, down from approximately $1.6 billion in 2010. Tom Wyatt, formerly a high-level executive at Old Navy, was hired as Knowledge Universe CEO. Wyatt would say that Knowledge Universe was "very strongly an authentic company in what we do.". Besides early learning and child care, Knowledge Universe also still had divisions dealing the secondary and post-secondary education. Revenues for 2013 were $1.4 billion.

In 2013 and 2014, Knowledge Universe sold its education businesses in the United Kingdom and in Asia, respectively.

In 2015, Knowledge Universe Education was sold to Switzerland-based Partners Group for undisclosed terms. Wyatt said that the sale would allow Knowledge Universe to stay on its path of growth.

Under the Partners Group ownership, Knowledge Universe Education renamed itself as KinderCare Education in 2016, as other parts were mostly gone and KinderCare was its best-known brand.

With the sale of Knowledge Universe Education, the parent Knowledge Universe had remaining to its name only some intellectual property and some real estate holdings. Lowell Milken stated that he was interested in non-profit educational activities going forward, not for-profit ones. Michael Milken remained wealthy, continued with his philanthropic activities, and received a presidential pardon in 2020.

== Legacy ==
During its early years, media profiles had been generally positive about the prospects of success for Milken and Knowledge Universe. However, when the sale of Knowledge Universe Education was made in 2015, it was evident that Milken's twenty years of efforts in the space had fallen well short of his ambitious goals to remake education via the power of market-driven enterprise.

An analysis by Jonathan A. Knee, a professor at Columbia Business School, concluded that Knowledge Universe's performance in terms of EBITDA, and other such metrics, was unimpressive.
