= Lowell Milken Center for Unsung Heroes =

Educational museum and nonprofit organization

The Lowell Milken Center for Unsung Heroes is an educational museum and nonprofit organization located in Fort Scott, Kansas. The center works with students and educators to develop history projects that highlight individuals described as "unsung heroes" from history. The organization originated from a 1999 high school history project about Holocaust rescuer Irena Sendler.

== History ==
The center's origins date back to a National History Day project initiated in the fall of 1999 by three students at Uniontown High School in Kansas: Megan Stewart, Elizabeth Cambers, and Sabrina Coons. Their teacher, Norm Conard, encouraged them to research Irena Sendler, a Polish social worker who rescued Jewish children from the Warsaw Ghetto during World War II.

The students found a brief reference to Sendler in a March 1994 U.S. News and World Report article and developed their research into a play called "Life in a Jar." The project gained national attention when the students discovered that Sendler was still alive and traveled to Poland to meet her. According to the National Endowment for the Humanities, the students "helped crack open the silence about the Holocaust in Poland" through their work.

Conard had previously been recognized with a Milken Educator Award, which provides $25,000 to outstanding K-12 teachers created by philanthropist Lowell Milken. The connection between Conard and Milken through this award program eventually led to the establishment of the center to expand similar educational projects.

== Programs and activities ==
Project-Based Learning - The center employs a three-phase project-based learning methodology known as "Discover, Create, Change." In the Discovery phase, students and educators conduct primary research and interviews to uncover and develop the story of an Unsung Hero through an interactive learning process that cultivates critical thinking, problem-solving, and leadership skills. During the Create phase, participants develop innovative ways to communicate their chosen Unsung Hero's story to broader audiences through theatrical performances, documentary films, websites, museum exhibits, books, and multimedia presentations. The Change phase focuses on the lasting impact of projects within classrooms, schools, and communities.

Discovery Award Competition - The center's flagship competition, the Discovery Award, invites students in grades 4-12 from around the world to create original projects showcasing the stories of Unsung Heroes. According to the Institute of Competition Sciences, the competition provides students "a unique opportunity to use their creative talents to research primary sources and develop outstanding projects that feature Unsung Heroes who can serve as role models and inspire others to create change." Participants submit documentaries, websites, and performances that demonstrate both historical research skills and creative communication abilities.

The competition has featured diverse historical figures, including Little Rock Central High School student Kendall Reinhardt, who faced bullies and beatings for being kind to African American students during school integration, and photojournalism student Therese Frare, who took an iconic photograph that changed public perception of AIDS in the early 1990s.

ARTEFFECT - ARTEFFECT represents the center's commitment to integrating visual arts education with historical learning. According to TeenLife, "The ARTEFFECT Competition is a juried annual visual arts competition for students in grades 6-12 who want to make a positive impact through their art." The competition awards over $25,000 to young artists who create exceptional projects about diverse Unsung Heroes who changed the course of history. Since 2016, thousands of students from around the globe have participated in ARTEFFECT. To enter the competition, students creatively interpret the story of an Unsung Hero from history in a visual work of art accompanied by an Impact Statement. The judging panel comprises museum, education, and visual arts experts who seek compelling, original submissions that present a fresh perspective on an individual who took extraordinary actions to change the course of history.

Fellowship Programs - The center offers fellowship programs for educators, bringing teachers to Fort Scott for professional development focused on the organization's educational methodology. These programs connect with the broader network of educators who have participated in similar recognition programs.

== Location and facilities ==
The center is headquartered in Fort Scott, Kansas, where it operates a museum and educational facility.
