= Young Israel Beth El of Borough Park =

Orthodox synagogue in Brooklyn, New York

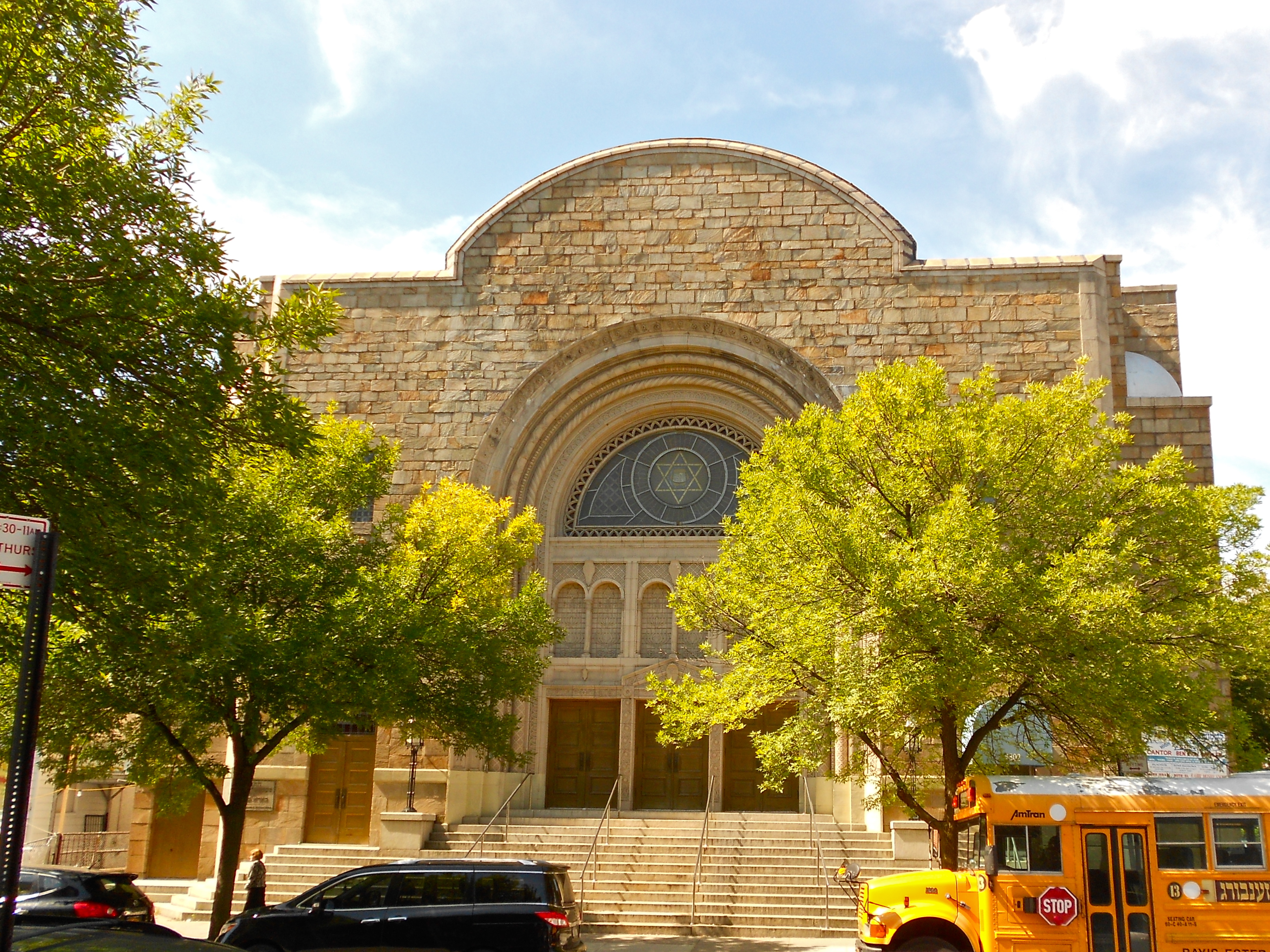
The 15th Avenue synagogue building, built 1923

Young Israel Beth El of Borough Park, sometimes called Young Israel Beth El of Boro Park and abbreviated as YIBE, is an Orthodox Jewish congregation and historic synagogue, located at 4802 15th Avenue in Borough Park, Brooklyn, New York City, New York, United States.

Formed in the 1980s through a merger of Temple Beth El of Borough Park, established in 1902, and Young Israel of Boro Park, established c. 1930s, the merged congregation worships from the historic 1920s temple that was listed on the National Register of Historic Places (NRHP) in 2010.

== Congregation history ==
=== Temple Beth El of Borough Park (1902-1980) ===
Congregation Beth El of Borough Park was founded in August 1902, and it erected a brick building in 1906, at 12th Avenue and 41st Street, that is the oldest synagogue building in Borough Park, now occupied by Chevra Anshei Lubawitz of Borough Park.

Although initially announced as a "Reform" congregation, also hinted at by the term "temple", without clarifying though its specific "Reform" nature, it veered within its first year of existence toward a more ecumenical character, trying to unite Orthodox and Reform tendencies. This very soon resulted in an Orthodox character, kept throughout its existence until today.

After the current building on 15th Avenue was constructed between 1920 and 1923 (see #15th Avenue building), the congregation later sold its 12th Avenue building, which has been used by several different congregations. In 2017, trustees of Congregation Anshe Lubavitch, the owners at that time, sold the 12th Avenue building to developers, sparking controversy and a civil court case with some of the other members.

Beth El's cantorial tradition led to its nickname, "the Carnegie Hall of Brooklyn." Its best known cantor was Moshe Koussevitzky (1899-1966), counted among the most notable hazzans of the 20th century, who served at Beth El between 1952 and 1966.

=== Young Israel of Boro Park (1930s-1980) ===
Young Israel of Boro Park, part of the National Council of Young Israel movement, was established well before World War II. One of its early rabbis was Rabbi Samuel Mirsky.

=== 1980 merger and aftermath ===
In the 1980s, the Young Israel of Borough Park, having sold its 1349 50th Street building years before for use as a Chasidic yeshiva, and then leased part of it back on a 10-year lease for synagogue use, merged with Congregation Beth El. The combined organization has fewer worshippers than in the 1980s. It worships from the 1920s building on 15th Avenue.

Young Israel's present rabbi previously served as youth leader; the Boro Park branch was known early on for its youth group.

=== Leaders ===
The following individuals have served as rabbi of the congregation:

Ordinal	Officeholder	Term start	Term end	Notes
1	Avroham Ever Hirshkowitz	1906	c. 1924	Beth El
2	Simon Glazer	1927	1930	Beth El
3	Israel Schorr	1938	2000	1938: Beth El, 1980: Young Israel Beth El
4	Gedalia Dov Schwartz	1969 (?)	1987 (?)	Young Israel, for 18 years; left in 1987 the latest
5	Moshe Snow	2000	2024	
6	Moshe Hubner	2024		

In addition, the following chazzans have served the congregation: Mordechai Hershman, throughout the 1920s, Berele Chagy, through the 1940s and early 1950s, Moshe Koussevitzky, from 1952 to 1966, Paul Zim (Zimelman), from 1966 to 1968, Moshe Stern, from 1968 to 1977, and Benzion Miller, from 1981 to 2025 (his death).

In 2025 Shulem Lemmer was hired as the chazan.

== 15th Avenue building ==
Young Israel Beth El of Borough Park
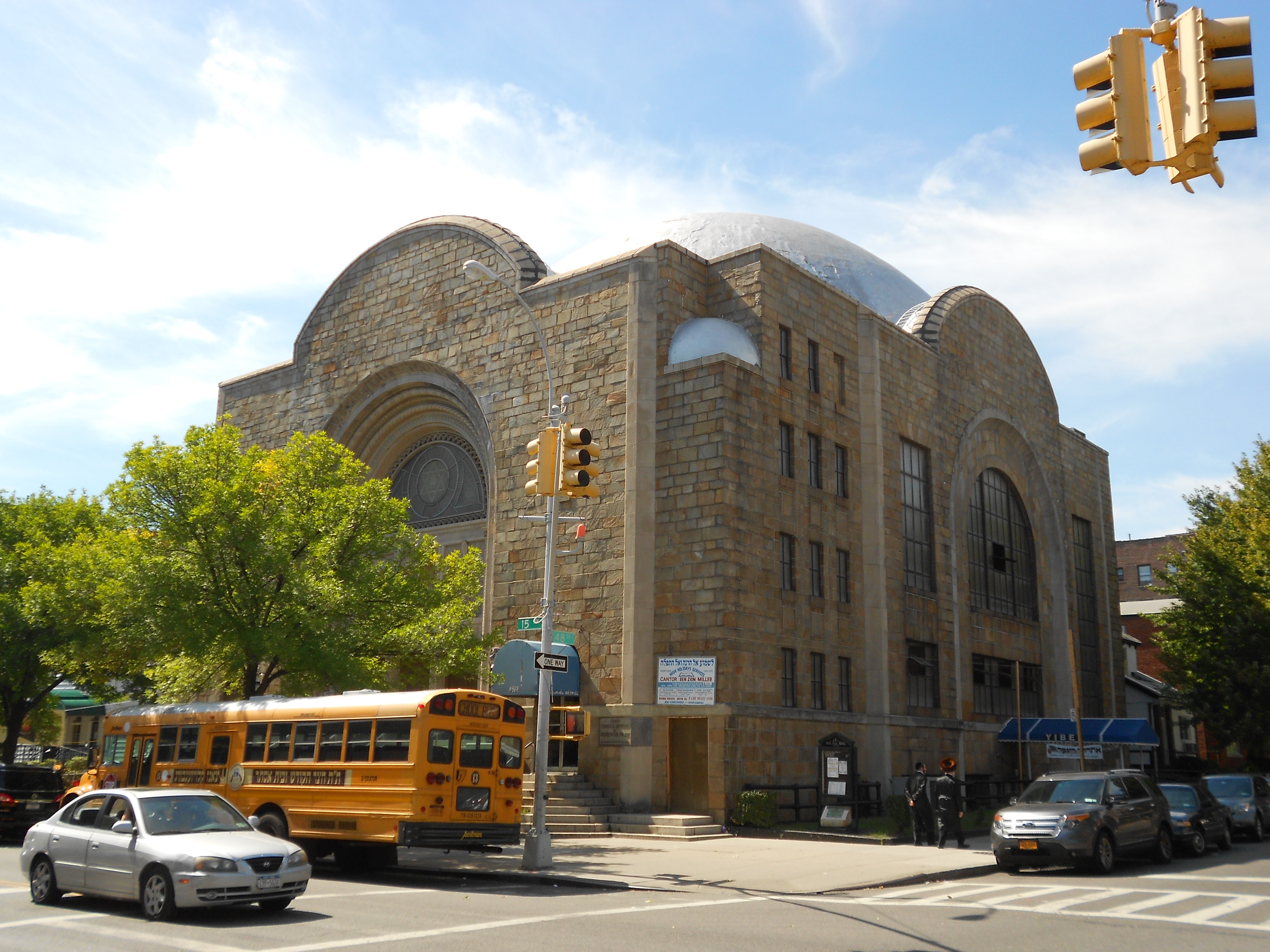
- Temple Beth El seen from across 15th Avenue and 48th Street

- Location in New York City

Religion
- Affiliation: Orthodox Judaism
- Ecclesiastical or organisational status: Synagogue
- Leadership: Rabbi Moshe Hubner
- Status: Active

Location
- Location: 4802 15th Avenue, Brooklyn, New York City, New York
- Country: United States
- Coordinates: 40°37′59″N 73°59′14″W

Architecture
- Architects: Shampan & Shampan
- Type: Synagogue architecture
- Style: Moorish Revival; Egyptian Revival
- Groundbreaking: 1920
- Completed: 1923

Specifications
- Direction of façade: SE, toward 15th Avenue (main facade); NE, toward 48th Street (secondary facade)
- Capacity: ca. 1400 in main sanctuary before 1975 addition of central bimah; less since
- Length: 110 ft
- Width: 85 ft
- Height (max): 85 ft
- Dome: 1
- Materials: Granite and limestone (facade); terra-cotta (facade copings, entranceways, dome)
- Temple Beth El of Borough Park
- U.S. National Register of Historic Places
- Area: less than one acre (100 x 120 ft)
- NRHP reference No.: 10000224
- Added to NRHP: April 27, 2010

The three-story building (basement, ground floor and balcony) on 15th Avenue was designed by Shampan & Shampan with Moorish Revival and Egyptian Revival influences. This building was listed on the National Register of Historic Places in 2010.

=== History ===
The building was ordered by the Temple Beth-El congregation, consisting of immigrants of Eastem-European origin. Construction started in 1920 and ended in 1923.

=== Description ===
The Brooklyn-based architects Shampan & Shampan designed it as a 85 by 110 feet rectangle, with an elevation of 85 feet from the grade (ground level) to the top of the dome. The plot around it measured 100 by 120 feet.

The style, mainly relating to the two facades, has been called a "first century design", a rather vague term. It blends several styles, including Egyptian Revival and Moorish Revival, with symbolic Jewish decorative elements (Star of David, menorah).

The principal facade has three entrances, followed by a tripartite vestibule and the main, square-shaped sanctuary, which is dominated by a very large dome. The dome is the work of Rafael Guastavino y Moreno and his son, Rafael Guastavino y Esposito. The elder Guastavino had imported from his native Catalonia, and furthet improved on, the timbrel arch system, for which he used curved structural "beams" built of thin terra-cotta tiles held together by an adhesive mix of Plaster of Paris and Portland cement mortar. The sanctuary has a balcony stretching around its sides and rear wall.

The secondary facade on 48th Street is similar but less decorated than the main one. It is also longer than the main facade, as on this side the building has an additional lateral section.

The basement contains a social hall, a "bet midrash" or study room boasting its own Torah Ark, where daily prayer services are held, and the synagogue offices.
