= Jewish Caruso =

The Jewish Caruso may refer to:

Ukrainian born cantors:

- Gershon Sirota (1874-1943), Jewish leading cantor of Europe who was friend of the choirmaster Leo Lowe, and died in the Warsaw Ghetto
- Yossele Rosenblatt (1882-1933), Ukrainian-born chazzan (cantor) and composer.
