= MyWay Village =

American social media

Connected Living
- Founder: Chris McWade, Sarah Hoit
- Website: MyWayVillage.com

Connected Living is a Quincy, Massachusetts-based provider of social networking services to senior citizens. Founded in 2006 by Chris McWade and Sarah Hoit, MyWay Village uses a secure proprietary interface and one-on-one personal support to facilitate senior citizens interacting online.

Connected Living was featured in a June 3, 2009 article in the New York Times.

== History ==
In 2006 after caring for aging relatives from a distance, the company's founders Chris McWade and Sarah Hoit realized that simplified computer technologies combined with personalized support services could significantly improve the quality of life for senior citizens—a large, growing portion of the population.

The company works with senior living communities across the country.

== Products ==
Senior community residents can access a customized home page that allows them to choose from a variety of activities including sending and receiving electronic messages, sharing and viewing photographs, listening to audio books and music, recording their own personal memoirs, and receiving notification of events happening daily in their community.

== Ambassadors ==
Connected Living provides on-going support to retirement communities, residents, and their families through a team of Ambassadors who provide individualized help for seniors, and who lead group activities and classes on computer use, memoir sharing, and book clubs.

== Executive team ==
Chris McWade—Co-Founder & Chairman

Formerly founder of Team Enterprises, Inc., an integrated marketing company. He also co-founded, incubated, and sold two Web 1.0 companies: beer.com and diamond.com. He holds a BSBA from Nichols College.

Sarah Hoit—Co-Founder and CEO

Formerly founder and CEO of Explore, Inc. and Director of White House Business Planning, Deputy Director of AmeriCorps. She has also been Managing Director and Partner at Thomas Partners Investment Management and Managing Director with Sylvan Learning Systems. She has a BA from Dartmouth College and an MBA from Harvard University.

Andrew Lowenstein -- CFO and President

Formerly VP of Business Development at Firefly Mobile and Executive Vice President of Global Operations at Convey Software. He has a BA from Yale University and an MA and MBA from Stanford University.
