= Koussevitzky =

Koussvitzky is a surname. Notable people with the surname include:

- Moshe Koussevitzky (1889–1966), Belarusian-born cantor
- Sergei Koussevitzky (1874–1951), Russian-born conductor
