= Willamette University School of Education =

- Type: Private
- Active: 1988–2014
- Location: Salem, Oregon, USA; 44°56′15″N 123°02′03″W
- Campus: Urban
- Website: willamette.edu/gse/index.html

Willamette University School of Education was a master's degree-granting program at Willamette University in Salem, Oregon, United States. Established in 1988, the school offered a master of arts in teaching degree and runs the Center for Excellence in Teaching program, or CET. The school closed in May 2014.

== History ==
The university started the School of Education in 1988, and added a Master of Arts in Teaching (MAT) program in 1992. The Center for Excellence in Teaching (CET) program began in 1999 and offered graduate level courses for teaching professionals. Willamette's Master of Arts in Teaching program had both a full-time and part-time option with four focuses in early childhood, elementary for grades 3 to 8, middle level for grades 5 to 9, and secondary for grades 7 to 12. A part-time MAT option called Aspire was added in 2004. The university closed the program because the university could not continue to offer a quality educational program due to financial issues and an uncertain market for teachers.

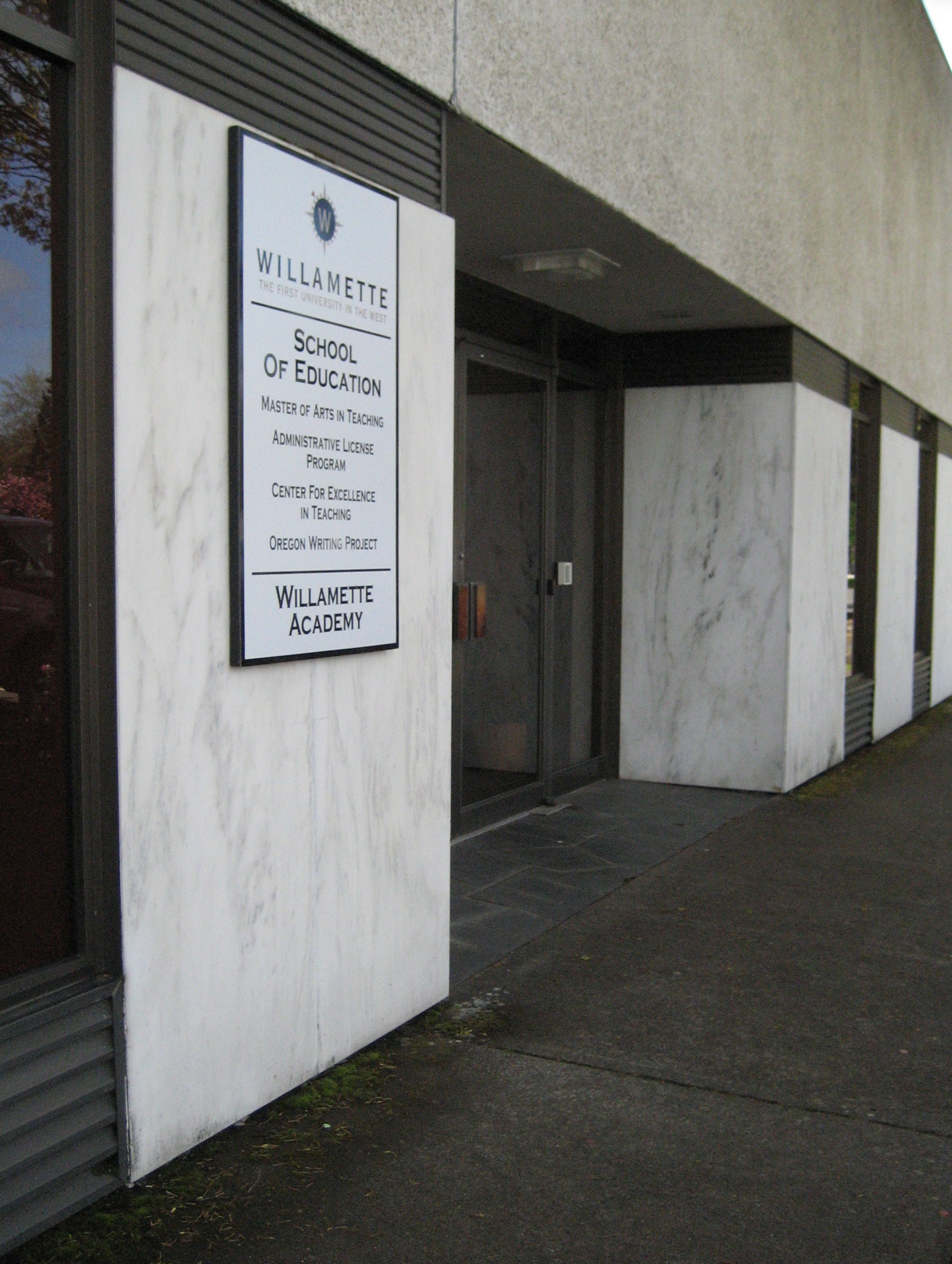
Entrance to the School of Education

Four MAT alums have been recipients of the Milken Family Foundation's Milken Educator Awards since 2000. The $25,000 award is given to educators who make efforts to furthering excellence in education.

== Other programs ==
Willamette's School of Education also offered the Oregon Writing Project that taught graduate students, teachers, and pre-college students. This included offering a Young Writers Camp during the summer for students in grades 3 to 7. Another program was an annual Fine Arts Festival sponsored by the school that introduced elementary students to a variety of arts including music composition, ballet, jazz, sculpture, and opera.
