= Simon Sargon =

American classical composer

Simon Arthur Sargon (April 6, 1938 – December 25, 2022) was a composer, pianist, conductor, music educator, and major creative figure in contemporary American Jewish music. His compositions include liturgical and secular pieces; opera and musical theatre; works for youth ensemble; choral and art song; and chamber ensemble and symphonic works.

== Early life ==
Sargon was born April 6, 1938 in Mumbai, India. His mother was of Ashkenazi (Russian) descent and his father was a Sephardic Jew whose family had settled in Mumbai. Sargon was brought to America at an early age and grew up in Winthrop, a suburb of Boston, Massachusetts.

== Education ==
Beginning his studies at the Longy School of Music in Cambridge, Massachusetts, Sargon went on to graduate magna cum laude and Phi Beta Kappa from Brandeis University with a B. A. in Music. He later attended the Juilliard School to obtain an M. S. in Composition in 1962. He also attended the Kneisel Hall Chamber Music School in Blue Hill, Maine; the Aspen Music Festival and School; and the Tanglewood Institute. His major teachers included Darius Milhaud, Irving Fine, Vincent Persichetti, Miecyslaw Horszowski, and Sergius Kagen.

== Career ==
From 1960 until 1971, Sargon was a recital partner for famed mezzo-soprano Jennie Tourel in concerts and master classes throughout the United States and abroad. He accompanied her for performances at the Peabody Conservatory, the University of North Carolina, the University of Chicago, and a 1963 memorial at Carnegie Hall for composer Francis Poulenc. At this time, he also served on the musical staff of the New York City Center Opera, the Lincoln Center State Theatre, Sarah Lawrence College, and the Juilliard School.

After receiving a grant from the America-Israel Cultural Foundation in 1971, Sargon relocated to Jerusalem, Israel where he worked as the Head of the Voice and Opera Department at the Jerusalem Academy of Music and Dance (formerly the Rubin Academy of Music) and served as a visiting lecturer at Hebrew University. He concertized throughout the country and was invited to give a solo piano recital at the Israel Museum.

In 1974, Sargon was appointed Director of Music at Temple Emanu-El in Dallas, Texas and began a 27-year tenure with one of the largest Reform Jewish congregations in America. His wide range of Jewish liturgical music includes two complete Friday evening services, a Sabbath morning service, and numerous solo and choral works. These pieces are well-known in synagogues and temples throughout the country. His direction brought the Temple Emanu-El Adult Choir to prominence in the larger Jewish community, touring extensively in the United States and Israel as well as to Jewish communities in Mexico City, Toronto, London, Dublin, Birmingham, Paris, Amsterdam, Vienna, Prague, and Budapest. The Choir premiered Sargon's work Elul Midnight - A Cantata of Penitence with the Dallas Symphony Orchestra in 1984 and was invited to present a concert at the U. S. Holocaust Museum in Washington, D. C. in 1996.

Sargon served as Composer-in-Residence and received commissions from leading temples throughout the country and, as emeritus at Temple Emanu-El, continued to consult and collaborate with cantors and other temple musicians on creative projects. He was a Fellow of the Center for Jewish Culture and Creativity and participated in the Center's First International Symposium held in Jerusalem in 1996. In 2003, the American Conference of Cantors made him an Honorary Member in recognition of his achievements and for "his outstanding contributions to Jewish Music and Jewish Life". In the fall of 2006, Sargon was one of ten composers selected from throughout the country to be a panelist and present his music at the "Lost Legacy Conference" in New York, an event sponsored by Hebrew Union College- Jewish Institute of Religion, School of Sacred Music, an event which explored the music of the past generation of Jewish liturgical composers.

Many of Sargon's Jewish-themed concert works have been performed widely at music festivals and in concert series in the U. S. and abroad, including venues such as the Pittsburgh Jewish Music Festival, Music of Remembrance (Seattle, WA) and the Los Angeles Jewish Symphony series. Artists of the Orchestre National de Bordeaux Aquitaine performed his works at a Holocaust remembrance program in the Grande Synagogue of Bordeaux, France. His work for solo clarinet and piano, KlezMuzik, has circled the globe and was featured on U. S. State Department tours of Africa and Asia where it was performed at the Central University of the Nationalities and the Contemporary Music Academy, both in Beijing and at the Shanghai Conservatory of Music in China, among other venues.

In 1984, Sargon joined the music faculty of Southern Methodist University in Dallas, Texas, as director of the Opera Theatre, and retired as professor emeritus of Composition in 2014. The Dallas Symphony Orchestra premiered three of his works to critical acclaim (Elul Midnight; Symphony No. 1: Holocaust; Tapestries), and his instrumental and vocal works have been performed nationally and internationally. He was a regular feature on Dr. Karl Haas’s program "Adventures in Good Music".

In 2007, Sargon was in residence with the Northwest German Philharmonic in Hanover, Germany, where he supervised a recording of his orchestral work, Tapestries, to be broadcast throughout Germany and the European Union. The American Conference of Cantors paid tribute to Sargon at its 2008 national convention in San Francisco, California, with a concert of his works.

Sargon's special interest in creating works for young people is reflected in his many compositions for young musicians. In addition to a multitude of other works, A Voice Called was written for youth choir with narrations and musical settings of the poetry of Hannah Senesh, a hero of the Holocaust. It was written not just for performance in a Jewish setting but as a meaningful artistic vehicle for use in Holocaust awareness and education programs in schools and other venues.

The Dallas Symphony Orchestra featured Sargon's work, The Town Musicians of Bremen, at its opening concert of the 2009-2010 Family Concert Series. This work for narrator and orchestra was adapted by the composer from the story of The Brothers Grimm. Following its successful premiere at Tufts University in 2006, it has been performed to enthusiastic response in venues as diverse as the University of Missouri-Columbia's summer music festival (with the Missouri Contemporary Ballet); twice at Southern Methodist University (with the Meadows School of the Arts Division of Dance); and twice on young people's concerts at Music in the Mountains in Durango, Colorado (with the Pagosa Springs Youth Drama Group). The Dallas Symphony Orchestra's performance included the participation of the Dallas Black Dance Theater.

In 2018 to mark his 80th birthday, Southern Methodist University in Dallas presented a program of his vocal music, including individual songs and excerpts from song cycles, and in Washington, D.C. Temple Sinai gave a concert of his compositions that included 15 cantors, several instrumentalists, and 175 volunteer singers. In November 2021, Cantor Azi Schwartz and the Park Avenue Synagogue in New York City premiered Sargon's Azkara: A Jewish Requiem as part of "A Jewish Requiem: Music, Memory, and the Will to See"; a program commemorating Kristallnacht with the participation of intellectual and activist Bernard-Henri Lévy.

Asked by broadcaster Bruce Duffie in a 2006 interview, “Why have music at all?” Sargon said, “Music is one of the greatest, richest and most satisfying gifts that we as humans have on Earth. Without music, my life would be devoid of meaning. It would be bare and empty. I can’t imagine it.”

== Commissions and awards ==
Notable commissions include the Dallas Symphony Orchestra (Haas Trio; Toward the Light), Meadows Foundation (Saul, King of Israel), Yale University (Psalm 8), Voices of Change (Fantasy on 'The Miller's Tears'; Shema), the Dallas Holocaust Society (Ash un Flamen), and the American Conference of Cantors (Ha-Melech Ha-yosheiv (The King Who Dwells on High)). Sing God's Praise, a Friday evening service for youth choir was commissioned and recorded in its entirety by the Children's Choir of Temple Rodeph Shalom in New York and has gone into its second printing at Transcontinental Music.

The Texas Music Teachers Association named Sargon its Commissioned Composer twice, in 1994 (Dusting Around with Scott's Rag) and 2003 (Sonic Portals). Sargon has received the Annual Award of Recognition from the American Society of Composers, Authors, Publishers (ASCAP) 1992–93. He was named a Finalist in the National Opera Association Competition (1997, The Singing Violin); and awarded First Prize in the National Association of Teachers of Singing competition (1993, Waves of the Sea). During his tenure at SMU he was honored with the Meadows Foundation Distinguished Teaching Professor Award.

Sargon is listed in Baker's Biography of Musicians (7th edition) and the International Who's Who in Music (11th edition). His works are included in Keith E. Clifton's Recent American Art Song: A Guide (2008) and featured in Hampsong Foundation's "Song of America" project at www.songofamerica.net. Two of Sargon's compositions are included in the Milken Archives Collection of 20th Century American Jewish Music (Shema and At Grandfather's Knee).

== Publishers and distributors ==
Sargon's works are published by Transcontinental Music Publications, Hal Leonard, Boosey & Hawkes, Southern Music, and Lawson-Gould, among others. His work as both composer and pianist may be heard on the New World, Crystal, Klavier, and Ongaku labels. The Gasparo label has devoted three CDs exclusively to his compositions (Shema, Flame of the Lord, and A Clear Midnight). Distributors include TrevCo Music, Van Cott Information Services, and Classical Vocal Reprints, among others.
