= Jeff Klepper =

Jeff Klepper is a cantor and influential figure within Contemporary Jewish religious music, particularly the "American nusach" scene. He has performed with Rabbi Dan Freelander as part of the group Kol B'Seder since 1972. Their melody for Shalom Rav is the most popularly sung in the denominations of Judaism where many prayers are sung rather than chanted. His compositions have been preserved in the Milken Archive of Jewish Music.

Jeff was ordained at Hebrew Union College-Jewish Institute of Religion and earned a master's degree in music from Northeastern Illinois University. He was awarded an Honorary Doctor of Music from HUC-JIR in 2005. He co-edited the song section in the Reform prayer book, Mishkan T’filah, and co-founded (with Debbie Friedman) the annual Hava Nashira song-leader workshop.
