= KinderCare Learning Centers =

American childcare and education provider

KinderCare Learning Centers, LLC
- Company type: Incorporated, Private
- Traded as: New York Stock Exchange Ticker KLC
- Industry: Early Childhood Education
- Founded: July 14, 1969; 56 years ago Montgomery, Alabama, U.S.
- Founder: Perry Mendel
- Headquarters: Portland, Oregon, U.S.
- Number of locations: 1,250 locations (2023)
- Key people: Tom Wyatt, CEO
- Revenue: US$7.8 billion (2021)
- Number of employees: 36,000
- Parent: KinderCare Education
- Website: www.kindercare.com

KinderCare Learning Centers, LLC is an American operator of for-profit child care and early childhood education facilities founded in 1969 and currently owned by KinderCare Education based in Portland, Oregon. The company provides educational programs for children from six weeks to 12 years old. KinderCare is the third-largest privately held company headquartered in Oregon. In 39 states and the District of Columbia, some 200,000 children are enrolled in more than 1,250 (as of 2023) early childhood education community centers, over 600 before-and-after school programs, and over 100 employer-sponsored centers. In 2021, revenue was US$7.8B (2021). In 2022, it acquired Crème de la Crème, a former competitor that provided complementary services.

== Company history ==
=== Founding ===
Perry Mendel, a real estate developer, founded KinderCare Nursery Schools after speculating that increasing numbers of women entering the workforce would increase demand for preschool child care. The first facility was opened on July 14, 1969 on Sunshine Drive in Montgomery, Alabama accommodating 70 children. A second facility was opened in 1970, and the company changed its name to Kinder-Care Learning Centers, Inc. By 1971, 19 centers were in operation and the first infant care was offered.

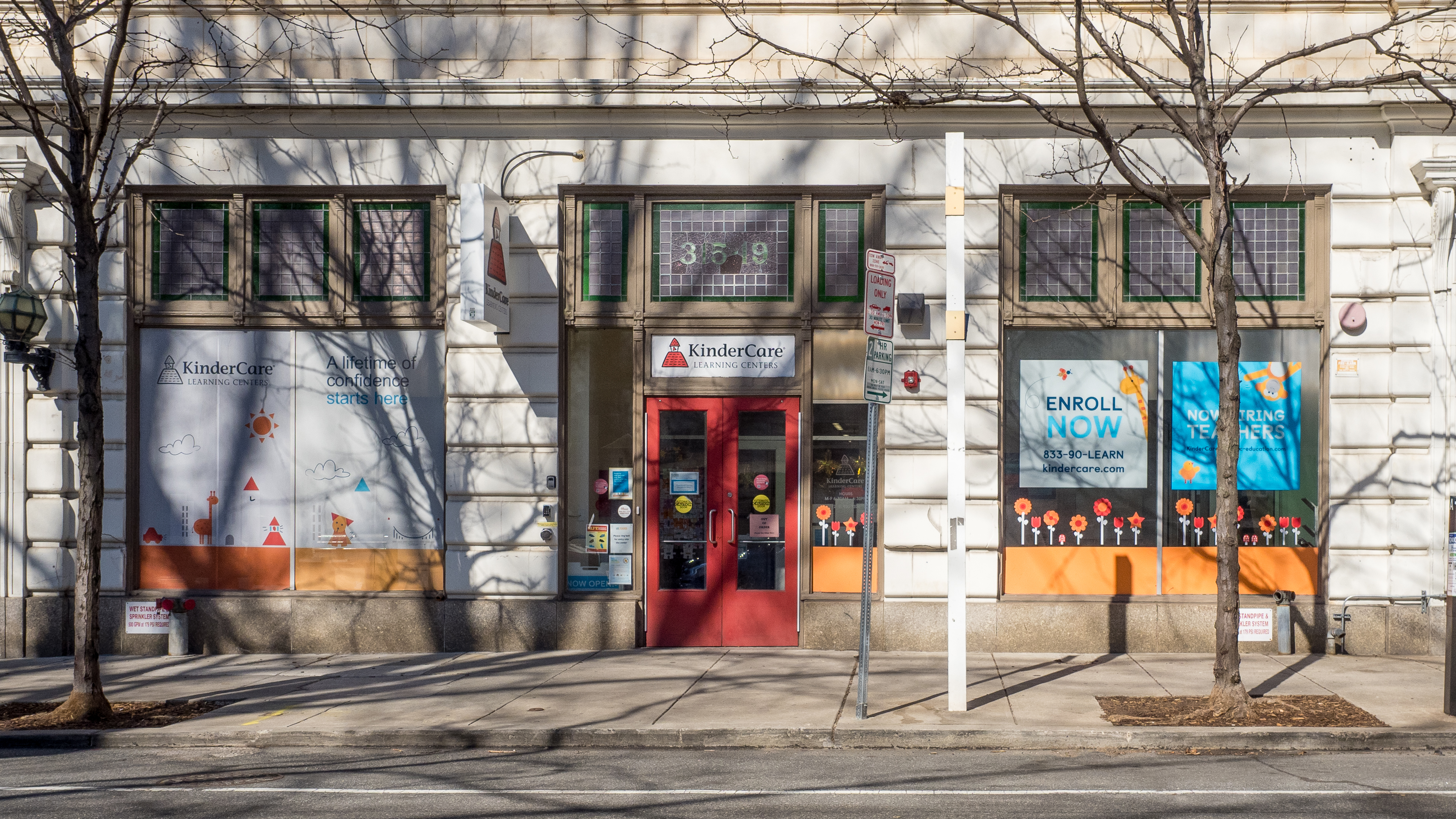
One of the company's schools in Philadelphia, PA

The firm went public in 1972; by 1974, the company had 60 centers located in 17 states and over 500 employees nationwide. The company's first major acquisition came in 1977, when it purchased the 15 facilities of Playcare. In 1979, it acquired Mini-Skools, Living and Learning, and American Pre-Schools. In 1985, the company opened its 1,000th center.

In 1987, Kinder-Care stated it was expanding at the rate of one new center every three days. It also acquired Sylvan Learning Centers, a provider of supplemental instruction and tutoring.

In 1992, the company updated its bell tower logo and began to render the KinderCare name in camel case.

=== Bankruptcy period ===
In the 1980s, Kinder-Care, like several public companies of the time, attempted a conglomeration business strategy to raise revenue, as its investors forced it to purchase completely unrelated companies such as American Savings for $188 million. They also purchased photo studios, shoe stores and a foreign fertilizer manufacturer.

Chief Executive Grassgreen, informed by 'junk bond king' Michael Milken from the firm of Drexel Burnham Lambert, led the company on an ill-conceived diversification plan in the late 1980s. As a result, the company's debt load increased from $10 million to about $620 million in 1988. The company found itself in deep financial trouble after Black Monday crash of 1987.

During this period, Tull Gearreald, an investment banker, took command of the company as president and CEO. Caught in a cash squeeze in January 1991, Kinder-Care stopped paying interest on its debt. Still faltering under its high debt load, KinderCare filed for Chapter 11 bankruptcy protection on November 10, 1992. The company continued operating, although, according to a 1988 Forbes article, less than half of Kinder-Care's sales and profits for the year were expected to come from its child care centers.

In January 1993, in a move that helped their balance sheet, KinderCare sold off Sylvan Learning Centers for $8 million.

=== Post-bankruptcy corporate history ===
In October 1996, KinderCare was acquired by the private equity firm Kohlberg Kravis Roberts & Co.

KinderCare was acquired in 2005 by the Knowledge Learning Corporation (KLC) division of Knowledge Universe. By coincidence, Knowledge Universe had been privately founded and owned by Michael Milken since 1996, five years after his prison release. The deal, valued at over US$1 billion, made KLC the nation's largest private childcare and education provider.

In 2012, company revenues were $1.45 billion, down from $1.6 billion in 2010. Revenue rose to UD7.8 billion in 2021.

In July 2015, Partners Group, a Swiss enterprise, bought Knowledge Universe. Knowledge Universe renamed itself as KinderCare Education in January 2016. The parent company, KinderCare Education, also operates Knowledge Beginnings, Children's Creative Learning Centers (CCLC), and Champions. In 2022, it acquired Crème de la Crème, a former competitor that provided complementary services.

=== COVID-19 response ===
During the 2020 coronavirus pandemic, KinderCare temporarily shut down 1100 of their approximately 1500 daycare centers, leaving the centers that have large proportions of first responders and healthcare workers.

=== IPO Filing ===
In October 2021, The Oregonian reported that Kindercare confidentially filed for an IPO. The company then postponed citing regulatory delays.

== Accreditation ==
The National Association for the Education of Young Children (NAEYC) and other associations have accredited over 700 KLC centers.

== Quality of care and education ==
Research in Maryland found that children who had attended KinderCare were more likely to be ready for school.

== Criticism and legal challenges ==
The company has been criticized as being part of the "McDonaldization of society". George Ritzer criticizes the company for "hir[ing] short-term employees with little or no experience in child care".

The company has been the subject of legal challenges. In Roberts v. KinderCare Learning Centers, Inc. the judgment was found for KinderCare. In Jesi Stuthard and ADA v. Kindercare Learning Centers, Inc. judgment was against KinderCare.

== See also ==
- List of companies based in Oregon
