= Neil W. Levin =

Neil W. Levin is a Professor Emeritus of the Jewish Theological Seminary, and since 1993 has served as the Artistic Director of the Milken Archive of Jewish Music.

Levin has studied the music of the Jewish experience from historical, musical, and ethnological perspectives. His areas of focus include comparative considerations of eastern and western spheres of Ashkenazi Jewry in terms of their sacred work, secular art, theatrical, and folk music, and the musical creativity and life of American Jewry. As a professor of Jewish music on the faculty of the Jewish Theological Seminary of America in New York (JTS) since 1982, he has taught graduate courses on the history, development, and repertoire of synagogue music, cantorial art, Yiddish and Hebrew folksong, the music of modern Israel, and music of the Jewish-American experience. He has been a lecturer and presenter at university seminars and academic conferences throughout the United States, Europe, and Israel.

== Early life and studies ==
Levin was born in 1947 and grew up in a musical family in Chicago where he played piano. A pupil of Swiss pianist Rudolph Ganz, he won several competitions during his childhood. He went to New York to study piano with Adele Marcus at the Juilliard School while studying liberal arts at Columbia University.

He developed a deep interest in cantorial art and history in the wider context of both synagogue and secular Jewish music studies. He also began his exposure to traditional Yeshiva learning. After completing his BA degree, he spent a year in Israel, where he immersed himself in Hebrew language, Jewish studies, and Jewish musical investigations in preparation for his graduate academic work; and he also began to engage in field research and oral history collection, which he continued in the US, Canada, and England. He completed his Masters degree at Columbia. He also studied general Judaica and Jewish music at JTS and earned his doctorate in Jewish music and music history.

== Career ==
Levin taught music at Columbia before joining the JTS faculty in 1982.

Levin is also a highly regarded choral conductor. He studied choral conducting in Robert Page’s master classes and workshops at the Aspen Music School and Festival in the 1970s, and from 1973 to 1978 he directed the Chicago Zimriya Youth Chorus.

He is the founder and director of two professional Jewish choruses: the mixed-voice Coro Hebraeica and the male-voice Schola Hebraeica. He is also the creator of Vanished Voices, a Holocaust commemoration incorporating his research into the music traditions of German-speaking Jewry, performed under his baton in 1996 at London’s Barbican Centre as well as in Los Angeles and New York. In 1999 he directed more than a dozen concerts (with Schola Hebraeica and other ensembles) at the biannual Sacred Voices Music Village festival.

From 1990 to 1998 Levin was the Editor of Musica Judaica, the academic Journal of the American Society for Jewish Music. He has published numerous articles on Jewish music, several archival-historical recordings, and books. In 1982 the University of Vienna commissioned him to edit the complete works of Salomon Sulzer for the Denkmäler der Tonkunst in Österreich (Monuments of Music) series. His historical study of music and cantorial education within the Conservative movement was published in the 1997 book Tradition Renewed.

Levin arranged five international academic conferences and conference-festivals on Jewish musical themes: Varied Voices (1987), co-sponsored by the Jewish Theological Seminary and the American Society for Jewish Music; A Voice for Our Time (1991), devoted to the music of Salomon Sulzer and other Austrian Jewish composers, and co-sponsored by the Seminary and Hebrew Union College; Counter-Harmonies (1989), a conference on the music of modern Israel, which was co-sponsored by the National Foundation for Jewish Culture, the 92nd Street Y, the Keshet Foundation, and the National Endowment for the Arts; Voice of Ashkenaz (1997), a deliberation on the musical legacy of German Jewry, co-sponsored by JTS and the Leo Baeck Institute; and Only in America (2003), which addressed the music of American Jewish experience and which was sponsored jointly by the Seminary and the Milken Archive.

From February to May 2017, Levin served as YIVO’s first Anne E. Leibowitz Visiting Professor-in-Residence in Music.

== Awards ==
In 2004, in recognition of his program notes about the Russian Jewish composer, Joseph Achron, Levin was presented with the Deems Taylor Award - the annual award given by the American Society of Composers and Publishers (ASCAP) for the most original and informative liner notes to a commercially distributed recording.
