= Michael Isaacson =

American composer of Jewish synagogue music (b.1946)

Michael Isaacson (born in Brooklyn, New York, USA in 1946) is a composer of Jewish synagogue music, and one of the originators of the Jewish camp song movement. His camp songs were often written and premiered on the same day, defining the camp music movement in the 1960s.

== Biography ==
He received his MA in Composition from Brooklyn College, where he studied composition with Robert Starer. He also holds a PhD in Composition from the Eastman School of Music, where he studied under Warren Benson and Samuel Adler. After moving to Los Angeles in 1976 to compose and arrange for television and film, he was commissioned by several local congregations to produce the synagogue works, 'Sim Shalom' from the Regeneration album, and 'Bayom Hahu' from the Nishmat Chayim Shabbat service. His work in conjunction with Cantor Nathan Lam of Stephen S. Wise Temple was recorded on several albums, including the 1986 album Legacy, described by one reviewer as "startling". His setting of "Bayom Hahu" was used as "a strong representation of Jewish-sounding music" in the 1999 film Liberty Heights (anachronistically, since the film is set in the 1950s). In 1990, Isaacson was the first artistic director of what is now called the Milken Archive of American Jewish Music.

He has conducted and produced more than fifty CDs of symphonic, chamber, and choral music, including all the permanent exhibit symphonic music for New York City's Museum of Jewish Heritage. He conducted a recording of it entitled "Heritage" with the Israel Philharmonic Orchestra in Tel Aviv and has subsequently conducted 15 CDs of Jewish music with the IPO and its chamber music group the Israel String Quartet.

He was co-commissioned by forty-three North American Reform, Conservative, and Reconstructionist Jewish congregations to compose and produce a Sabbath evening service entitled "L'maaseih V'reisheet - To Recreate the World" with standardized pre-recorded accompaniment tracks and synthesis and instrumentation (EWIs and EBIs). The work simultaneously premiered on Shabbat Shirah, the Sabbath of Song in January 2001; making it the largest co-commission of synagogue music in history. Much of his sacred music incorporates both Hebrew and English in the text. His choral arrangements of Yiddish, Ladino, and Israeli music comprise The Michael Isaacson Folk Music Series at Transcontinental Music Publications.

The three-volume Michael Isaacson Songbook, published by Transcontinental Music Publications, includes 160 of his musical compositions for solo and unison voices accompanied by keyboard. He composed a three-movement chamber work is for clarinet and string quartet entitled "The Shul In My Right Mind".

Isaacson is also the author of the 2007 book "Jewish Music as Midrash: What Makes Music Jewish?", accompanied by a double CD of his musical examples. The spoken version by Dr. Isaacson is available from Oysongs.com

Isaacson was one of the ten composers who were the subject of a 2006 multimedia exhibition called "A Living Legacy: American Jewish Liturgical Composers of the 20th Century" at the Hebrew Union College-Jewish Institute of Religion Museum in New York.

In 2017, he was awarded Honoris causa a Doctor of Humane Letters from Hebrew Union College.

Though he is known primarily for his work in music for the Jewish life cycle and worship, Isaacson has also produced over 100 chamber works for double reed instruments published by Trevco Music and works for flute and piccolo from ALRY Music. His "The Fearless Whistler" and "November Song" for piccolo have expanded the instrument's image.

The Michael Isaacson Archive – containing his publications, manuscripts, and papers – is held at the Sibley Music Library, Eastman School of Music in Rochester, New York.
