= Pico Union Project =

Multi-faith cultural arts center in Los Angeles

Coordinates: 34.0457°N 118.2743°W

- Formation: 2013
- Founders: Craig Taubman, Louise Brent Taubman
- Type: 501(c)(3) nonprofit
- Headquarters: 1153 Valencia Street, Pico-Union, Los Angeles, California, U.S.
- Website: https://www.picounionproject.org

The Pico Union Project is a multi-faith cultural arts center and house of worship in the Pico-Union neighborhood of Downtown Los Angeles, California. Founded in 2013 by musician Craig Taubman and educator Louise Brent Taubman, the nonprofit occupies the oldest surviving synagogue building in Los Angeles and is dedicated to the principle of "love your neighbor as yourself." The organization hosts worship for Jewish, Christian, and Muslim congregations alongside concerts, cultural programming, and neighborhood social services, and its sanctuary also operates as a live music venue.

== Building ==
The organization's home at 1153 Valencia Street is a Greek Revival building constructed in 1909 as the first location of Sinai Temple, the city's first Conservative congregation. It is the oldest surviving synagogue building in Los Angeles and was designated Los Angeles Historic-Cultural Monument No. 173 in 1977. When Sinai Temple moved westward in the mid-1920s, the Welsh Presbyterian Church purchased the building, preserving its Stars of David stained glass windows, and occupied it for 88 years. The congregation seismically retrofitted the structure in the 1980s at its own expense rather than allow it to be condemned. By 2012 its membership had dwindled to roughly ten people, and after a final service that December, the dissolving congregation approached the Jewish Historical Society of Southern California about returning the building to the Jewish community. The sanctuary retains its original stained glass windows, hardwood floors, and pipe organ, with movable pews that allow the room to be reconfigured for concerts and events; it holds fewer than 400 people.

== History ==
At the urging of Steve Sass of the Jewish Historical Society, Craig and Louise Taubman purchased the building in 2013. Craig Taubman, then best known for the long-running Friday Night Live musical Shabbat service at Sinai Temple, initially planned a downtown performing arts venue for touring musicians. At his daughter's suggestion, the Taubmans first spent roughly six months consulting neighborhood residents, who identified housing, employment, food, health care, and safe gathering space as their most pressing needs. The couple reconceived the project as a nonprofit multi-faith cultural arts center serving the surrounding community, which is largely made up of immigrant families from Central America, Mexico, Cuba, and Korea. The Taubmans retained personal ownership of the building, initially donating its use to the nonprofit before phasing in rental payments from the organization, which retains rental income from resident faith communities, cultural groups, and private events.

By 2015, the building housed four resident faith-based organizations, three Christian and one Muslim; the Sanctuary@Pico Union program, launched that year with Jewish High Holy Day services, restored a Jewish worship presence. In 2016, Sanctuary@Pico Union received a $200,000 grant from the Jewish Community Foundation of Los Angeles, and in 2018 Zach Lasker was appointed the organization's first executive director. In November 2025, the Taubmans announced they would step down from daily leadership while remaining involved with the organization, and Serena Oberstein was named interim executive director.

== Programs ==
The Pico Union Project hosts regular worship for multiple faith communities, including services of the Women's Mosque of America, which held its first Friday prayer service in the building in 2015.

The organization operates Vida Sana, a free weekly farmers' market distributing fresh produce to the neighborhood's low-income residents, along with classes and professional development workshops. During the 2020 George Floyd protests, the building served as a staging ground for community activism and neighborhood support efforts. The organization also works with unhoused residents and immigrant families in the surrounding neighborhood.

== Music venue ==
Alongside its community programming, the sanctuary operates as an intimate concert venue. Courtney Barnett previewed her album Tell Me How You Really Feel there in 2018, in a show where the pews were removed for a standing-room audience. Rex Orange County chose the room for a surprise album-release show in 2024. The Los Angeles Chamber Orchestra has performed in the space, and the venue also hosts private events such as weddings and celebrations, with rental income supporting the nonprofit's community programs.
