= Berele Chagy =

Berele Chagy (Boris Haggai, 1892-1954) was a cantor and composer.

== Biography ==
Born July 25, 1892 in Dagdo, Russia to Yitzchak and Sheine Chagy, Chagy served as a cantor in Russia (1909-1913), South Africa (1922-1937), and the United States. His last position was at Temple Beth El of Borough Park, ending when he died in 1954. Both his father and his paternal grandfather were cantors in Russia. One of his grandchildren was the poet and violinist David Shapiro.

Chagy's successor at Beth-El was Moshe Koussevitzky.

Chagy's singing was as a tenor.

== Works ==
Among his cantorial compositions recorded are: Brich Shmei, Tikanto Shabbos, Kol Hashem, Shma Isroel, Mogen Ovos, Tzur Yisroel, V'hu Rachum, Bameh Madlikim, and Hashem Moloch Geus.
