= Kol B'Seder =

Jewish music duo

- Origin: Great Barrington, Massachusetts, U.S.
- Genres: Contemporary Jewish, folk music
- Years active: 1972–present
- Website: www.kolbseder.com

Kol B'Seder is an American Jewish musical duo formed in 1972 by Rabbi Dan Freelander and Cantor Jeff Klepper. The group is recognized for their extensive contributions to contemporary Hebrew liturgical music used in worship spaces, summer camps, and educational settings. Their melody for "Shalom Rav" is a widely-sung prayer for peace.

== History ==
Kol B'Seder began at Eisner Camp, a Union for Reform Judaism summer camp in Great Barrington, Massachusetts. Freelander and Klepper met while serving as songleaders and began composing original music during their time there. The name "Kol B'Seder," a Hebrew phrase loosely translated as "everything's OK," exemplifies an accessible approach to musical worship. Their early compositions were influenced by American folk music, with the intention of bringing a communal-singing style to Reform Jewish liturgy. The duo performed regularly at synagogues, conventions, and Jewish youth gatherings throughout the 1970s and 1980s.

== Musical style and influence ==
Kol B'Seder's work integrates Hebrew prayer texts with melodies inspired by folk and pop music traditions, including Woody Guthrie, Pete Seeger, James Taylor and Crosby, Stills, and Nash. They have been called the “Simon and Garfunkel of American Jewish Music”. Their melody for "Shalom Rav" is a widely-sung prayer for peace to this day.

Kol B'Seder were early participants in a trend sometimes referred to as "American nusach," which sought to adapt traditional Jewish liturgical modes into contemporary musical formats. Many of their compositions are designed to inspire group singing, and are utilized in a variety of worship settings. Their music has been noted for its simple but enduring structures and appealing melodies. Their body of work has been compared to that of Debbie Friedman, who also helped to shape the landscape of progressive Jewish worship music in 1970's and '80s.

Kol B’Seder’s approach has been recognized for promoting communal participation in worship and expanding the way music in worship spaces could be presented.

== Notable works ==
- "Shalom Rav" (1974): A setting of the prayer for peace that is used widely in progressive Jewish denominations.
- "Modeh Ani"
- "Lo Alecha"
- "Hineih Mah Tov"
- "Oseh Shalom"
- Kol B'Seder Live (1976): A live album capturing their early performance style.

== Legacy ==
Kol B'Seder's music continues to be heard in congregational and camp settings, and is taught by Jewish educators and songleaders. Their compositions have been incorporated into official songbooks and worship resources.

In 2024, the duo marked their 50th anniversary with a concert and the publication of the Kol B'Seder Anthology (2024), a songbook featuring lead sheets, commentary, and archival material.
