= Milken Family Foundation =

Philanthropic foundation

- Formation: 1982; 44 years ago
- Type: Private foundation
- Purpose: education and medical research
- Headquarters: Santa Monica, California
- Coordinates: 34.0177631°N 118.4969884°W
- Region served: Global
- Chairman & Co-Founder: Lowell Milken
- Co-Founder: Michael Milken
- Revenue: $27,852,920 (2014)
- Expenses: $16,684,835 (2014)
- Website: www.mff.org

The Milken Family Foundation is a private foundation established by Lowell Milken and Michael Milken in 1982. Lowell Milken serves as chairman and co-founder of the foundation.

== Goals ==
The foundation is focused primarily on supporting education and medical research.

Among the foundation's initiatives are:

- The Milken Educator Awards, a teacher recognition program awarding $25,000 to individual educators for teaching excellence;
- TAP: The System for Teacher and Student Advancement, a comprehensive school reform incorporating career advancement, collaborative professional development, teacher accountability and performance-based compensation. T The Center for American Progress released "Aligned by Design," a report by education researcher Craig Jerald that elaborated on this concept to specifically show how TAP's elements work together. South Carolina TAP was featured in TIME Magazine's February 2008 cover story. In 2006, BusinessWeek ranked TAP on its Top 10 List of Best Practices. The system was profiled in Education Week.
- Milken Archive of Jewish Music, a cultural and historic project dedicated to preserving the sacred and secular music inspired by 350 years of Jewish life in America;
- The Lowell Milken Center, an institution dedicated to the development of educational projects that feature unsung heroes as role models to 'repair the world.' Howard Cohen, Chancellor of Purdue University/Calumet, said about the LM Center: "History is not history until it is written or told. This is what you are doing so well with your unsung hero projects."
- Milken-University of Pennsylvania Graduate School of Education Education Business Plan Competition - Education entrepreneurs from early-stage start-ups compete in the competition, which features seven prizes totaling $145,000 in funding. In addition to the prizes, all Competition finalists are invited to participate in the Education Design Studio Fund (EDSF), a fund initiative created in collaboration with Penn GSE.

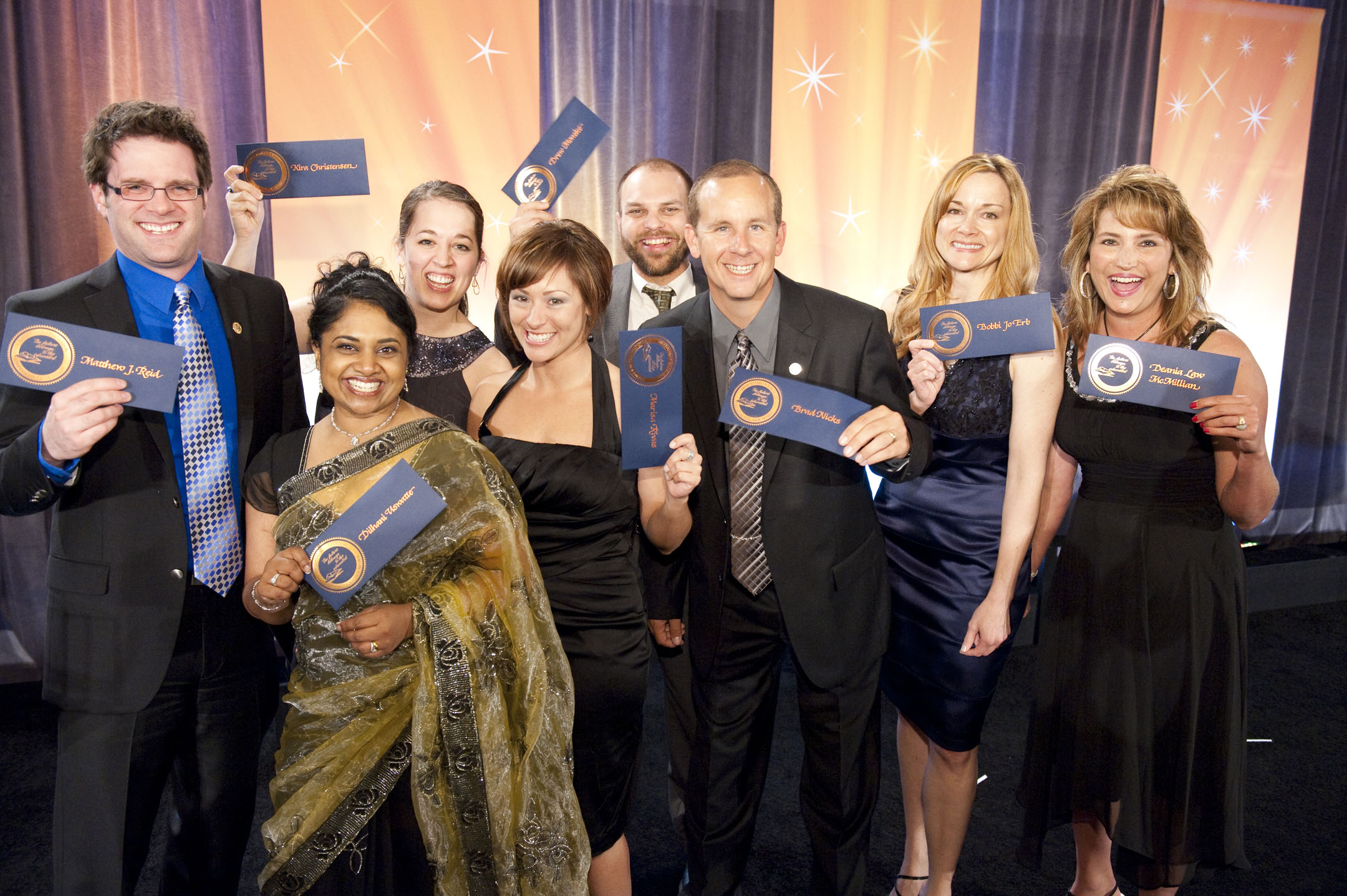
2010 Milken Educator Award winners receive their awards at the Educator Forum

== See also ==
- Milken Institute
