= David Shapiro (poet) =

American poet (1947–2024)

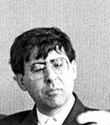
- Born: January 2, 1947; Newark, New Jersey, U.S.
- Died: May 4, 2024 (aged 77); New York City, U.S.
- Education: Columbia University (BA, PhD); Clare College, Cambridge (MA)
- Occupation: Poet

David Shapiro (January 2, 1947 – May 4, 2024) was an American poet, literary critic, and art historian. He wrote some twenty volumes of poetry, literary, and art criticism. He was first published at the age of thirteen, and his first book was published when he was eighteen.

== Education and teaching ==
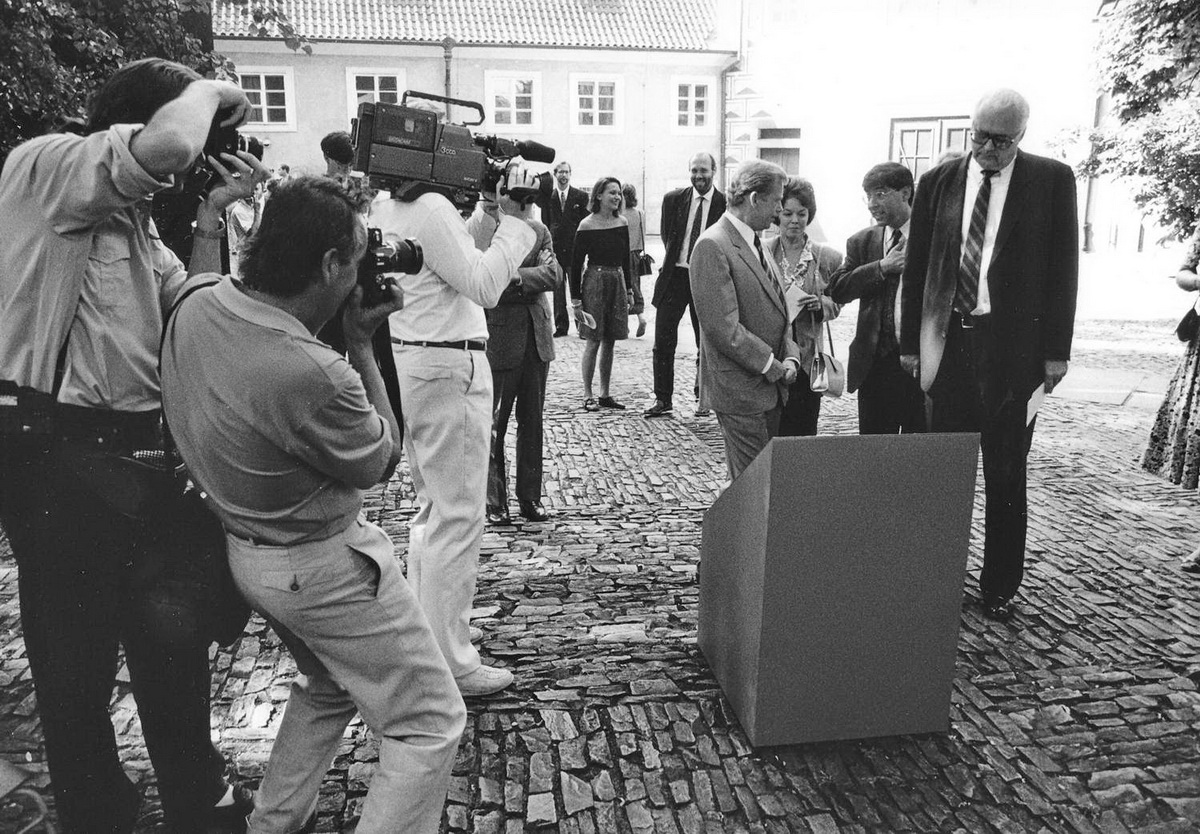
Václav Havel, Shirley Temple Black, David Shapiro and John Hejduk, Prague, 3 September 1991

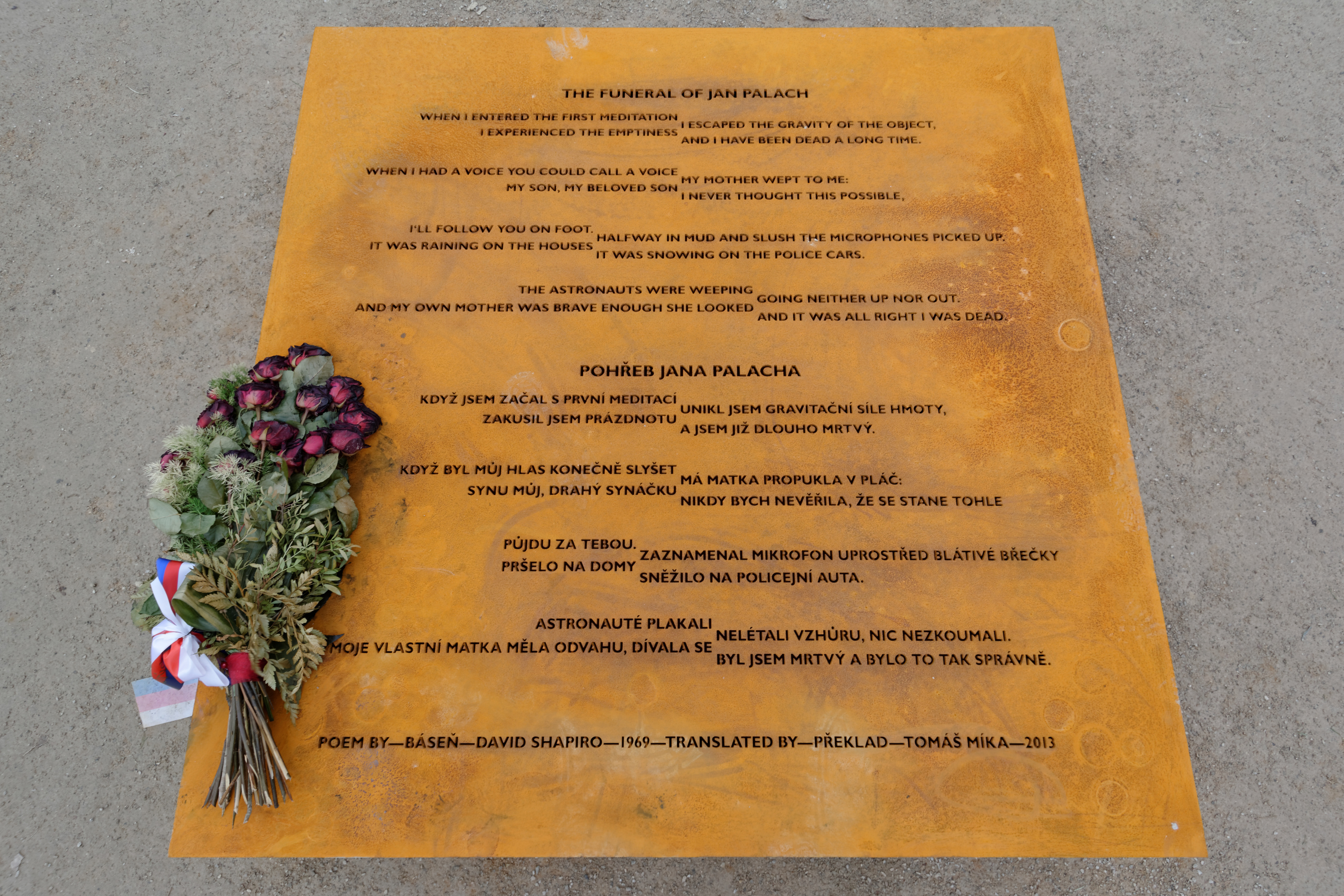
Memorial plaque in Prague with the Shapiro's poem "The Funeral of Jan Palach"

Shapiro was born in Newark, New Jersey, into a Jewish musical family. His maternal grandfather, Berele Chagy, was a distinguished cantor. Shapiro's family played string quartets together; the family quartet performed on Voice of America when Shapiro, a violinist, was 5.

Shapiro grew up in Newark and attended its Weequahic High School before matriculating (after deferring the early admission secured by mentor Kenneth Koch for a year and a half to focus on his musical and literary projects) at nearby Columbia University, from which he received a B.A. (1968) and Ph.D. (1973) in English. Already a musician of professional competence as a youth, from 1963 he was a violinist with the New Jersey Symphony and the American Symphony, among others.

From 1968 to 1970, he completed a second undergraduate degree on Columbia's Kellett Fellowship at Clare College, Cambridge, from which he ultimately held the Oxbridge M.A. with honors. Between 1972 and 1981, Shapiro stayed on at Columbia as an instructor and assistant professor of English, also serving as a visiting professor at Brooklyn College (1979). From 1980 or 1981 until his retirement in 2017, he was primarily affiliated with William Paterson University; there, he was the William Paterson Professor of Art History, Emeritus at the time of his death, having been initially hired as an associate professor in the discipline. In addition, he maintained his ties to the literary community by serving as a writer-in-residence and adjunct professor at Cooper Union for many years. During the 1982–83 academic year, he held a visiting appointment at Princeton University.

Shapiro achieved brief notoriety during the 1968 student uprising at Columbia, when he was photographed sitting behind the desk of President Grayson L. Kirk wearing dark glasses and smoking a cigar; Shapiro later described the cigar as "horrible". Notably (and in contrast to other protesters), his ensuing suspension did not affect his academic standing or subsequent receipt of one of Columbia College's most selective fellowships, although Shapiro never commented publicly on his treatment by University officials.

== Works ==
Shapiro's writing includes a monograph on John Ashbery, a book on Jim Dine’s paintings, a book on Piet Mondrian’s flower studies, and a book on Jasper Johns’ drawings. He translated Rafael Alberti’s poems on Pablo Picasso, and the writings of the Sonia and Robert Delaunay.

His sonnets on the death of Socrates are the basis for Unwritten, a song cycle by Mohammed Fairouz.

== Personal life and death ==
Shapiro lived in Riverdale, The Bronx, New York City, with his wife and son. He died of complications from Parkinson's disease in New York City on May 4, 2024, at the age of 77.

== List of works ==
- January: A Book of Poems–Holt, Rinehart and Winston, 1965
- Poems From Deal–E P Dutton, 1969
- An Anthology of New York Poets (co-editor)–Random House, 1970
- A Man Holding an Acoustic Panel–E P Dutton, 1971 (National Book Award Nominee)
- The Page Turner–Liveright, 1973
- Lateness: A Book of Poems–Overlook/Viking, 1977
- Introduction to John Ashbery's Poetry–Columbia University Press, 1979
- The Writings of Sonia and Robert Delaunay (co-translator)–Viking, 1979
- Jim Dine–Abrams, 1981; Alecta Press (German edition and translation)
- Lateness (Watercolors by Lucio Pozzi)–Generations Press, Paris, 1981
- To An Idea–Overlook/Viking, 1984
- Jasper Johns – Abrams, 1984
- The Body's Words on JM Haessle, 1988
- House (Blown Apart): A Book of Poems–Overlook/Viking, 1988
- Mondrian: Flowers–Abrams, 1991
- The Selected Poems of Jacques Dupin (co-translator)–Wake Forest, 1992
- The Eight Names of Picasso (co-translator)–Gas Station Editions, 1992
- After A Lost Original (etching by Terry Winters)–Solo Press, 1992
- The Green Lake is Awake: The Selected Poems of Joseph Ceravolo (co-editor)–Coffee House Press, 1994
- After A Lost Original–Overlook Press, 1994
- Inventory: New & Selected Poems (editor) by Frank Lima-Hard Press, 1997
- Body of Prayer (Shapiro, Michal Govrin, Derrida)–Cooper Union Press, 2001
- A Burning Interior–Overlook Press, 2002
- Rabbit Duck (Collaborative with Richard Hell) – Repair, 2005
- New and Selected Poems (1965–2006)– Overlook Press, 2007
- In Memory of an Angel -City Lights Publishers, 2017. ISBN 9780872867130
- Человек без книги (A Man Without a Book; Selected poems translated into Russian by Gali-Dana Singer) - Literature without borders (Latvia), 2017. ISBN 9789934856891

== Sources ==
- The Poetry of David Shapiro
