= Pierre Pinchik =

Jewish Hazzan

Pierre Pinchik (Yiddish: פינחס פינטשיק Pinkhas Pintshik, Russian: Пьер Пинчик P'yer Pinchik; 1893–1971), born Pinchas Segal, was a famous Hazzan from the period of the Cantorial golden age. He was also a composer of cantorial and Yiddish music and a singer of Yiddish folk songs. He especially known for his versions of Rozo D'shabbos and Ribono Shel Olom.

== Biography ==
=== Early life ===
Pinchik was born Pinchas Sigal in Novozhyvotiv, Vinnytsia Oblast, then part of the Russian Empire. Various dates are given for his birth year including 1897, or 1900. However, on most US government documents it is listed as March 16, 1893. As a youth he attended a Yeshiva of the Skverer Hasidim, where he was exposed to cantorial music. In his teen years he moved to Kyiv to live with his grandfather, who was a bookseller, and to continue his Talmudic studies. During that time a teacher in his Yeshiva observed his excellent singing voice and urged him to take piano lessons. He then enrolled in the Kyiv Conservatory, where he studied for four years.

=== Musical career ===
Pinchik made his musical debut singing in the Great Choral Synagogue in Kyiv in 1913. He soon began touring with Russian opera groups and theatre troupes. During the Russian Revolution, Pinchik was drafted into the Red Army in an artists' brigade. He was asked to compose revolutionary songs in Yiddish, which he did based on his knowledge of traditional folk and religious modes and melodies. He subsequently toured the Soviet Union giving concerts of Yiddish folk songs, and it was during this time that he adopted the stage name Pierre Pinchik.

From 1923 to 1925 or 1926 he became the cantor of the Leningrad Synagogue, a role previously held by famous cantors such as David Roitman and Zavel Kwartin. During his tenure there he was asked to perform Nineteenth-century compositions from the German synagogue tradition, which he felt did not match his tastes or singing style. Thus he reworked them into new styles that better matched his voice.

Around 1925, Pinchik obtained permission to leave Russia on tour, with the help of poet Itzik Feffer. He performed in various European cities before travelling to the United States in 1926 on a tour arranged by Joseph Hyman, who apparently heard about Pinchik from Fyodor Chaliapin. His tour was very successful, and in 1928 RCA Victor offered him an exclusive recording contract. He recorded a great number of 78 rpm albums for them during the late 1920s and early 1930s, many of which have been reissued in the years since. As well, on a musical level, the originality of his cantorial compositions made quite an impression on the American scene, inspiring a number of imitators. His Rozo D'shabbos in particular has been said many times to have caused a minor revolution in cantorial style. He also continued to take an interest in adapting Yiddish poems to song: I.L. Peretz, H. Leivick, A. Lutsky and others were among his favourite sources for material.

In 1937 he became a naturalized US citizen.

Pinchik did not take on a permanent posting at a synagogue in the United States, preferring to perform in various synagogues, halls and temporary spaces around the country as needed. For a number of years, he officiated at the K'nesset Israel Nusah S'fard in Chicago.

Pinchik died in New York City on January 7, 1971. He had been one of the last living cantors from the so-called Cantorial Golden Age.

He was not strictly Orthodox, though he led prayers for many Orthodox congregations.
