= Leo Low =

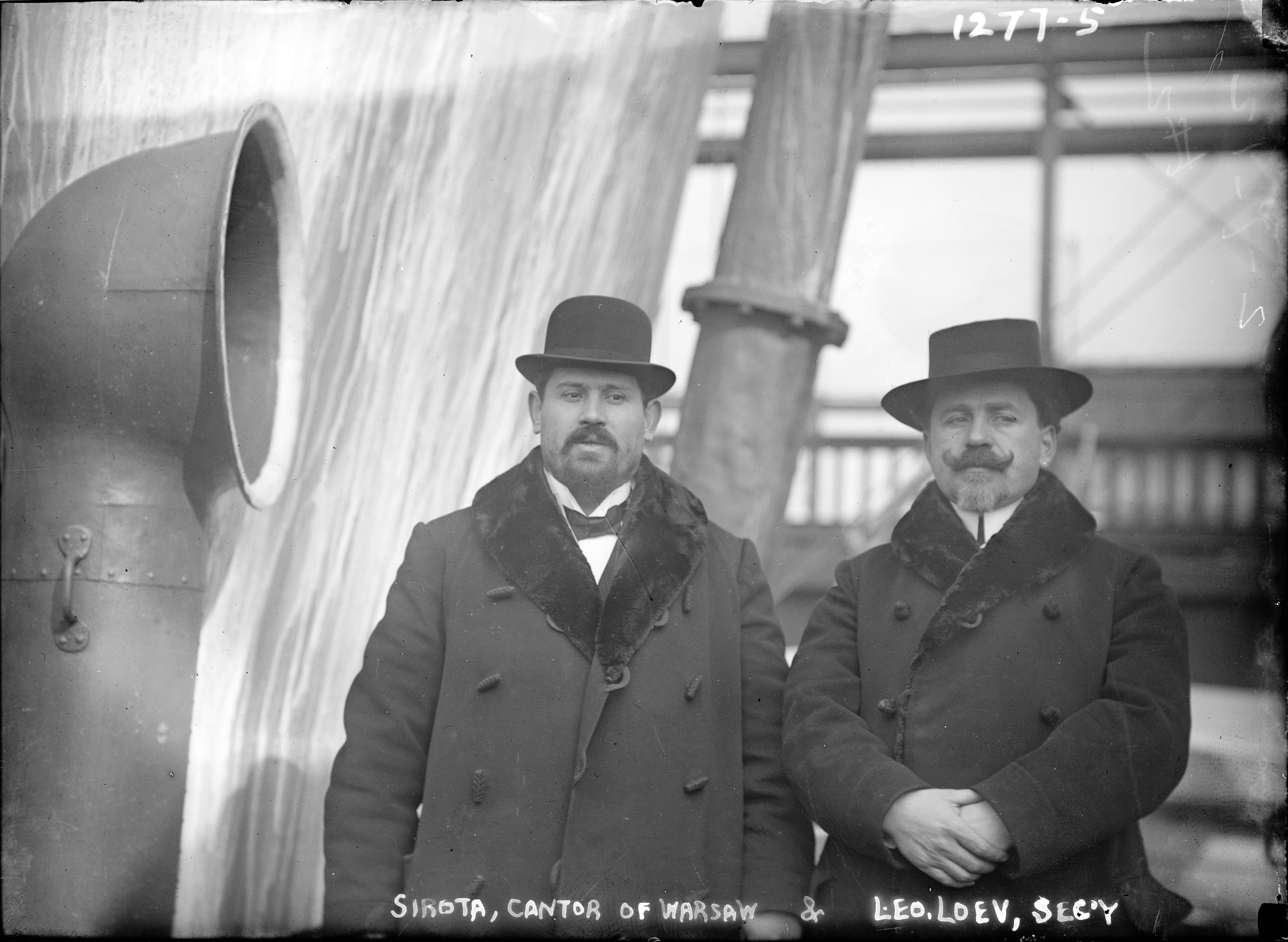
Gershon Sirota и Leo Low in USA. 1912.

Leo Low (born Moshe Leib Liow; 15 January 1878, Wolkowysk, Grodno Governorate – 5 October 1960, New York City) was Jewish choral conductor, composer, arranger, teacher and lecturer. He was one of the first to collect, arrange, and popularize Yiddish and Hebrew folk and art songs, popularizing songs such as A Dudele by Levi Yitzchok of Berditchev.

Low was born 1878 in Wolkowysk, Russia, and the Eastern European element is always apparent in his work. At the age of twelve, he led synagogue prayers for the first time. Three years later he was acting as choirmaster.

He worked as Choir conductor at the Great Synagogue in Vilna (1902–1905), Bucharest Reform Temple (1905–1908), Tłomackie Synagogue in Warsaw (1908–1920), Hazomir and Grosser Club choruses in Warsaw, choruses of the Jewish National Workers' Alliance and Workmen's Circle in New York.
