= Craig Taubman =

American musician, composer, and community leader (born 1958)

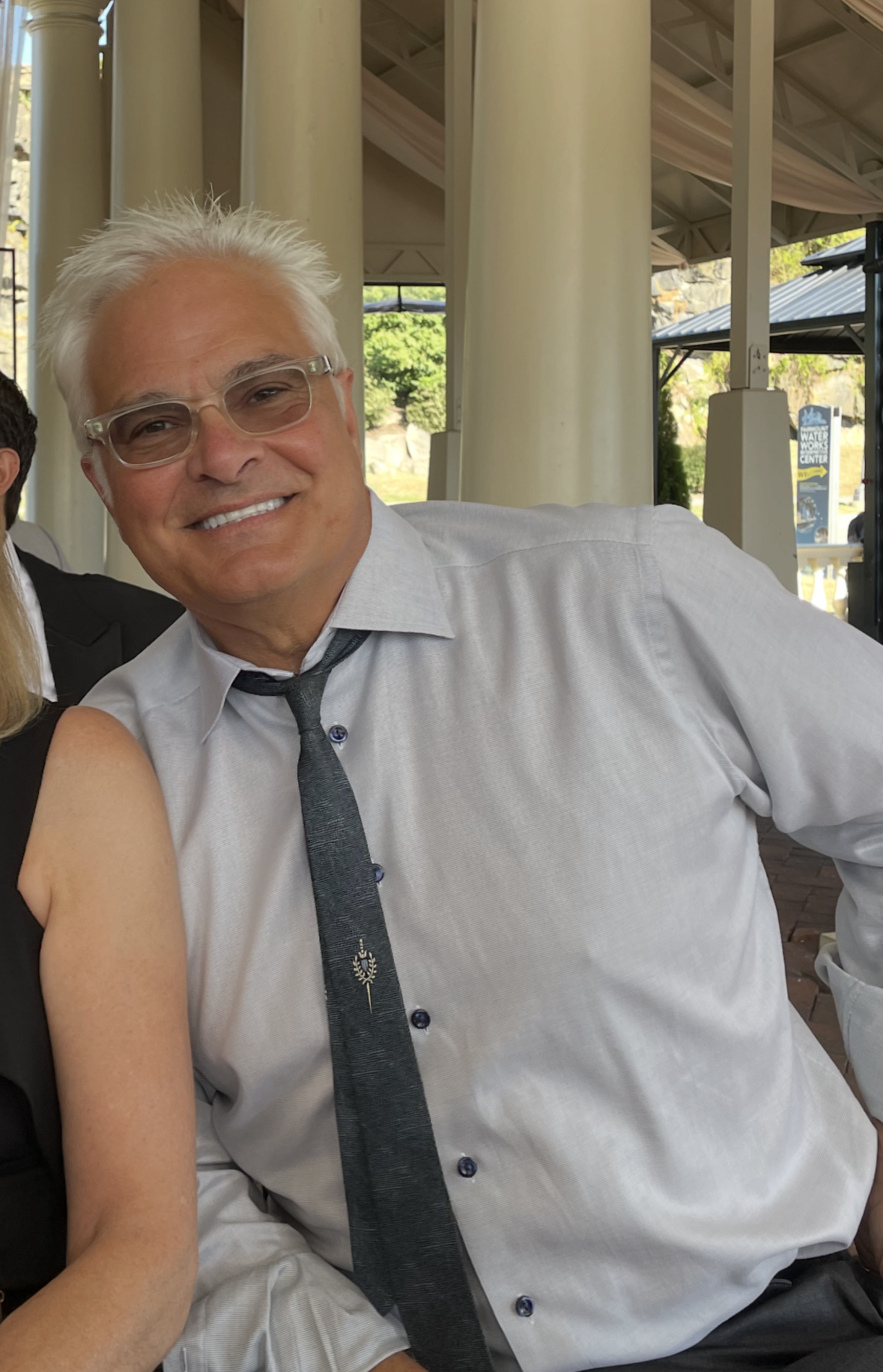
- Taubman in 2022

Background information
- Born: 1958 (age 67–68); Tennessee, U.S.
- Origin: Los Angeles, California, U.S.
- Genres: Jewish music, children's music, contemporary liturgical
- Occupations: Singer-songwriter, composer, nonprofit founder
- Years active: 1970s–present
- Labels: Walt Disney Records, Craig 'N Company
- Spouse: Louise Brent Taubman

Craig Taubman (born 1958) is an American singer-songwriter, composer, and community leader based in Los Angeles, California. Initially known as a children's recording artist for Walt Disney Records and later as a leading figure in contemporary Jewish liturgical music, Taubman is the founder of the Pico Union Project, a multi-faith cultural arts center housed in the oldest surviving synagogue building in Los Angeles. He serves on the Los Angeles County Economy and Efficiency Commission.

== Early life and education ==
Taubman was born in Tennessee in 1958 and raised in Los Angeles in a Conservative Jewish family. He came from a musical family; his brother Gene and sister Caren Glasser were also musicians, and Glasser had a children's music career in the 1980s. Taubman began performing at age 15, when a counselor at Camp Ramah in Ojai, California encouraged him to lead services on guitar.

Taubman studied at the University of California, Los Angeles, California State University, Northridge, and the University of Judaism in Los Angeles, and spent two years at the Hebrew University of Jerusalem, during which he performed for Israeli Prime Minister Menachem Begin.

== Music career ==
=== Early career and Disney years ===
Taubman founded Yad B'Yad, a performing troupe for Jewish teenagers, and built a following through concert appearances in the greater Los Angeles area while writing music for children's video and film projects. A 1990 Los Angeles Times profile described him as a rock musician who had turned to entertaining preschool audiences. His early independent albums included Moment to Moment (1985), Encore (1989), and Journey (1991).

In the early 1990s, Taubman signed with the "Music Box" artist roster at Walt Disney Records, where his group Craig 'N Company released three albums in two years: Morning 'N Night (1992), Rock 'N Together (1992), and Rock 'N Toontown (1993). Craig 'N Company was one of only two children's acts paired with mainstream pop performers such as Paula Abdul and Michael Bolton in For Our Children: The Concert. After Disney released its roster of human artists, Taubman recorded Imaginit, which won a Dove Award in 1996, and launched his own label, Craig 'N Company, in 1995. The label's debut release, My Jewish Discovery, won a Parents' Choice Award.

=== Jewish liturgical music ===
From 1999 to 2014, Taubman and Rabbi David Wolpe created and led Friday Night Live, a monthly musical Shabbat service at Sinai Temple in West Los Angeles that drew as many as 2,000 attendees, many of them young adults estranged from synagogue life. The service and Taubman's 1999 album Friday Night Live, which collected its original melodies, helped reinvigorate Shabbat services in Los Angeles and across the United States. He followed it with One Shabbat Morning (2002), a Saturday morning service developed over two years at Adat Ari El in North Hollywood. In 2008, Taubman performed in Lights: Celebrate Hanukkah Live in Concert, a Hanukkah special aired nationally on PBS alongside artists including The Klezmatics and Dave Koz. In 2013, Time named him among ten leading figures in contemporary Jewish music.

Taubman also produced the Celebrate Series, a line of themed compilation albums of Jewish music. His catalog exceeds 50 recordings.

=== Television and film ===
Taubman composed and directed music for the Fox children's series Rimba's Island, the HBO animated series Happily Ever After: Fairy Tales for Every Child, and Shari Lewis's PBS series The Charlie Horse Music Pizza. His music has also been featured in the Disney Educational Productions environmental short Recycle Rex (1993), the Paramount Pictures film Andre, and New Line Cinema's The Adventures of Pinocchio.

== Pico Union Project ==
In 2013, Taubman and his wife Louise purchased the original home of Sinai Temple, a Greek Revival building at 1153 Valencia Street in the Pico-Union neighborhood of Downtown Los Angeles. Built in 1909, it is the oldest surviving synagogue building in the city and a designated Los Angeles Historic-Cultural Monument; it had housed the Welsh Presbyterian Church for 88 years until that congregation dissolved in 2012. Taubman initially planned a downtown performing arts venue, but after roughly six months consulting neighborhood residents about their needs, he reconceived it as the Pico Union Project, a nonprofit multi-faith cultural arts center dedicated to the principle of "love your neighbor as yourself." The Taubmans retained personal ownership of the building, initially donating its use to the nonprofit before phasing in rental payments from the organization.

The organization hosts religious services for multiple faith communities, including the Women's Mosque of America, along with musical performances, cultural events, and Vida Sana, a free weekly farmers' market for the neighborhood's low-income residents. During the 2020 George Floyd protests, it served as a staging ground for community activism. In November 2025, the Taubmans announced they would step down from daily leadership while remaining involved; Serena Oberstein was named interim executive director.

== Public service ==
Taubman was appointed to the Los Angeles County Economy and Efficiency Commission by Supervisor Hilda Solis in August 2021.

== Jewels of Elul and other projects ==
From 2005 to 2024, Taubman created and self-published Jewels of Elul, an annual compilation featuring 29 short essays from faith leaders, thought leaders, and public figures, corresponding to the 29 days of the Hebrew month of Elul preceding the High Holy Days. He later developed "30 Days," a project inspired by Shloshim, the Jewish 30-day mourning ritual.

== Personal life ==
Taubman lives in Los Angeles with his wife, Louise, who co-founded the Pico Union Project.

== Discography ==
=== Studio and liturgical albums ===
- Moment to Moment (1985)
- Encore (1989)
- Journey (1991)
- Where Heaven and Earth Touch (1993)
- Voice of the Spirit (1996)
- My Jewish Discovery (1997)
- Kol Tikvah: Voices of Hope (1997)
- Friday Night Live (1999)
- The Best of the Rest (2001)
- One Shabbat Morning (2002)
- Inscribed (2005)
- The Shabbat Lounge (2006)
- The Passover Lounge (2007)
- Holy Ground (2009)
- How Good (2010)
- 36 Years in Song (2014)

=== With Craig 'N Company on Walt Disney Records ===
- Morning 'N Night (1992)
- Rock 'N Together (1992)
- Rock 'N Toontown (1993)
