= Milken Educator Award =

American education award program

Milken Educator Awards
- Abbreviation: MEA
- Formation: 1985-87
- Type: Nonprofit organization
- Legal status: Foundation award program
- Purpose: To celebrate, elevate and activate the teaching profession
- Headquarters: Santa Monica
- Location: California
- Region served: United States
- Members: Over 2,600
- Official language: English
- Executive Director: Lowell Milken, Milken Family Foundation Chairman and co-founder
- Parent organization: Milken Family Foundation
- Website: www.milkeneducatorawards.org

The Milken Educator Awards is an educator recognition program in the United States that provides unrestricted grants of $25,000 cash to teachers deemed successful, in surprise ceremonies. Created in 1985 by education reformer and philanthropist Lowell Milken and first presented in 1987, this initiative of the Milken Family Foundation has presented awards to over 2,900 teachers across the United States, averaging around 30-40 teachers per year. Teacher Magazine nicknamed the program the "Oscars of Teaching." The award currently gives $25,000 in unrestricted funds to teachers who are early in their career, or mid-career, to reward them "for what they have achieved—and for the promise of what they will accomplish in the future." Recipients are ambushed at school assemblies or other public events to be publicly celebrated with the surprise announcement of the awards. For example, in January 2016, a Hawaii high school science teacher was "shocked" to receive the award, given at a school-wide assembly.

== History ==
Since its founding and first award presentation, the Milken Educator Awards has recognized over 2,900 teachers with awards that include an individual, unrestricted cash prize of $25,000. Through the program, the Milken Family Foundation has awarded over $74 million to the award recipients.

== Selection process ==
There is no nomination process to be considered for the Milken Educator Award. Candidates are confidentially recommended to the Foundation by a blue-ribbon panel appointed by each state's department of education.

== Qualifications ==
Based on guidelines established by the Foundation, participating states' departments of education appoint blue-ribbon committees that recommend candidates for selection. Identification and selection procedures are confidential, and the program does not include a formal nomination or application procedure. The criteria for the selection of outstanding elementary and secondary school teachers, principals and other education professionals as Milken Educators include all of the following:

- "Exceptional educational talent as evidenced by effective instructional practices and student learning results in the classroom and school;
- Exemplary educational accomplishments beyond the classroom that provide models of excellence for the profession;
- Individuals whose contributions to education are largely unheralded yet worthy of the spotlight;
- Early- to mid-career educators who offer strong long-range potential for professional and policy leadership; and
- Engaging and inspiring presence that motivates and impacts students, colleagues and the community."

== Program goals ==
The goals of the Milken Educator Awards are:

- "To honor and reward outstanding K-12 educators for the quality of their teaching, their professional leadership, their engagement with families and the community, and their potential for even greater contributions to the healthy development of children.
- To focus public attention on the importance of excellent educators.
- To encourage able, caring and creative people to choose the challenge, service and adventure of teaching as a career.
- To create national and state networks of Milken Educators that foster the active professional development and career enhancement of Milken Educators and other professionals, encourage Milken Educators to help shape the educational policies that influence their classrooms and schools, connect Milken Educators with the educational improvement efforts of state and federal education agencies, universities, educators, corporate partners and others.
- To engage corporate and foundation partners in assisting Milken Educators and in supporting policies that advance education."
