= Gershon Sirota =

Gershon Sirota c.1910 portrait

Gershon-Yitskhok Leibovich Sirota (Russian: Гершон-Ицхок Лейбович Сирота, Yiddish: גרשון יצחק סיראָטע; 1874 – 19 April 1943) was one of the leading cantors of Europe during the "Golden Age of Hazzanut" (cantorial music), sometimes referred to as the "Jewish Caruso".

== Biography ==
Sirota began his cantorial career in Odessa, then spent eight years in Vilna as cantor of the Shtatshul (State Synagogue) there. It was in Vilna that he began his collaboration with choirmaster Leo Lowe, which would continue throughout his career. He performed on numerous occasions throughout Europe, and in 1902, he sang at a reception in honour of Theodor Herzl, the founder of the Zionist Movement.

In 1907, Sirota assumed the position of cantor at the prestigious Tłomackie Street Synagogue in Warsaw. He continued his concert appearances around Europe, and even sang in Carnegie Hall in New York City to a sold-out crowd. While a cantor at the Tłomackie Synagogue, he also began recording his music. The first Jewish records, made in Vienna, Berlin, and St. Petersburg and spread across the whole Jewish world, were of the two famous cantors: Gershon Sirota and Zavel Kwartin. As the technology improved, he was constantly rerecording the songs so that listeners could trace the improvement of his rich tenor voice over the years.

While Sirota eventually left the synagogue over disputes concerning his frequent performances, he continued to live in Warsaw. Nevertheless, he travelled frequently, and his concerts were attended by Jewish and gentile audiences alike—and according to some accounts, even by Caruso.

Caught in Warsaw during the Nazi invasion of Poland during World War II, he spent his final years living in the Warsaw Ghetto, and died in the Warsaw Ghetto Uprising in 1943.
