= Lowell Milken =

American businessman and philanthropist (born 1948)

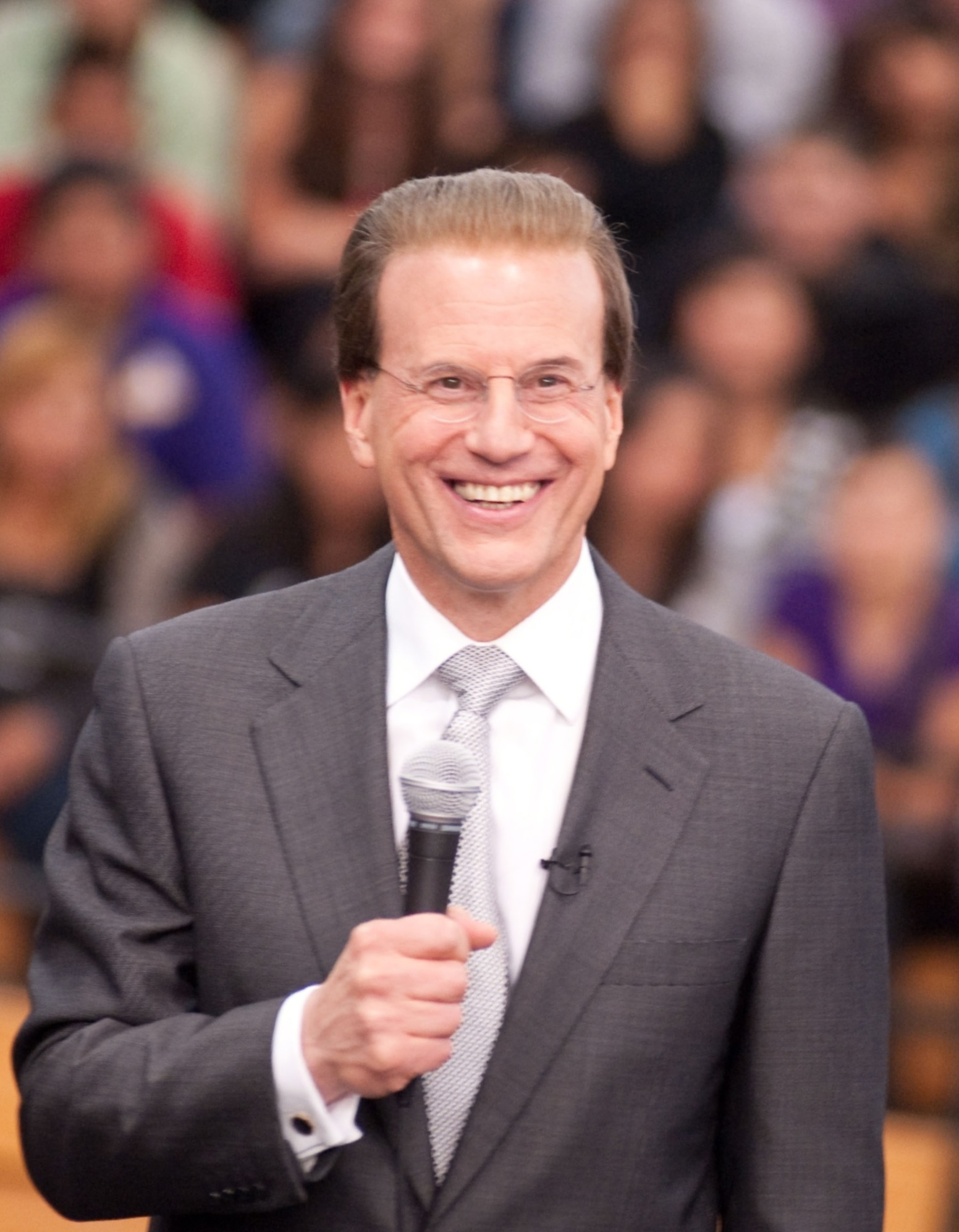
- Milken in 2009
- Born: Lowell Jay Milken; November 29, 1948 (age 77); Encino, California, U.S.
- Education: University of California, Berkeley; UCLA School of Law
- Occupations: Businessman, philanthropist
- Relatives: Michael Milken (brother)
- Website: lowellmilken.com

Lowell Jay Milken (born November 29, 1948) is an American businessman, philanthropist, and the co-founder and chairman of the Milken Family Foundation. He is also the founder of the National Institute for Excellence in Teaching, TAP System for Teacher and Student Advancement as well as co-founder of Knowledge Universe, the world's largest provider of early childhood education from 2005 until 2016. He is known for his advocacy and nonprofit leadership focused on K-12 American education reform. In 2017, he was the recipient of the James Bryant Conant Award for exceptional contributions to American Education. Lowell Milken has founded several more nonprofit organizations, including the Lowell Milken Family Foundation and the Lowell Milken Center for Unsung Heroes. In 2000, he was named one of America's most generous philanthropists by Worth magazine and has been listed for the past 7 years in the Los Angeles Business Journal's LA500 list of the most influential and impactful executives in Los Angeles.

Milken is a former senior vice-president in the High-yield debt department for Drexel Burnham Lambert, which was forced into bankruptcy in 1990, and which was headed by his brother Michael Milken.

In 1985, he created the Milken Educator Awards, widely considered the preeminent teacher recognition program in the nation.

== Early life ==
Lowell Jay Milken was born on November 29, 1948, in Los Angeles and grew up in Encino, California. He is the second son of Bernard and Ferne Milken; his older brother Michael was born in 1946 and a sister Joni born in 1958. The family moved to the San Fernando Valley in 1953, where Lowell attended LAUSD public schools, including Hesby Elementary School in Encino, Portola Junior High School in Tarzana, and Birmingham High School in Van Nuys.

Milken graduated Phi Beta Kappa and summa cum laude from the University of California, Berkeley where he won the business department's top student award. He earned a J.D. degree from the University of California, Los Angeles, where he was a member of the Order of the Coif honor society and an editor of the UCLA Law Review. Milken graduated in the top ten percent of his class at UCLA School of Law.

== Philanthropy ==
Lowell Milken co-founded Milken Family Foundation in 1982 and serves as its chairman. He also established the Lowell Milken Family Foundation in 1986 to support and provide funding for organizations and initiatives that strengthen communities through education and lifelong learning.

In 1990, Milken founded the Milken Archive of Jewish Music, a project to discover, record, preserve and disseminate the music of the American Jewish experience. The archive holds more than 600 recordings, 200 oral histories and 50 albums, all documenting the Jewish contribution to American music, from the liturgical music of Sephardi immigrants during the colonial era through the hits of the Yiddish stage and the jazz, blues and rock eras.

Well before data-driven education reform was emphasized by the 2000 No Child Left Behind legislation, Lowell Milken conceived, implemented and oversaw programs and initiatives to advocate for, support, and reward teachers who were improving student achievement in a measurable manner in America's K-12 schools. Among his early contributions to improving K-12 education, Lowell Milken created the Milken Educator Awards in 1985 to recognize the importance of outstanding educators and to encourage talented young people to choose teaching as a career. Today, the Milken Educator Awards is the nation's preeminent teacher recognition program, coined "the Oscars of teaching" by Teacher Magazine. Milken continues to present awards to teachers annually.

In 1999, the Los Angeles Times published an Op-Ed by Lowell Milken entitled "Why Not Create the $100,000 Teacher?" in which Milken argues that flexible salaries, professional development, and greater rewards for quality teaching are solutions, stating: "A recent report by the Center for the Future of Teaching and Learning underscores the teacher-quality crisis in California. Yet its recommendations, while worthy, do not go far enough. The solution is to create multi-tiered staffing opportunities that increase salary flexibility, open up new career-growth paths and provide ongoing professional development opportunities. By providing greater rewards and motivations for quality teaching, this strategy makes the profession competitive with other industries scrambling to recruit scarce human capital in our increasingly knowledge-based economy."

That same year, Lowell Milken founded the Teacher Advancement Program (now called the TAP System for Teacher and Student Advancement). The TAP System was designed by Lowell Milken to significantly improve teacher recruitment, retention, practices, motivation and performance. The comprehensive whole school reform model is intended to improve teacher quality in the United States and, in turn, enhance student learning through opportunities given to teachers and administrators to pursue multiple career paths, receive ongoing professional growth, participate in instructionally focused accountability and earn additional compensation and bonuses based on multiple measures of performance. Over the past two decades, multiple independent studies have reported that TAP's multi-tiered approach has resulted in higher levels of achievement with students and schools where TAP is implemented in comparison to respective non-TAP counterparts due to TAP's emphasis on multiple career paths, intensive professional development, ongoing evaluation, and differential compensation.

The TAP System for Teacher and Student Achievement currently impacts more than 275,000 educators and 2.7 million students across the country. In 2005, Milken founded an independent public charity to support and manage the TAP System, The National Institute for Excellence in Teaching (NIET), and has since served as its chairman.

National support for the TAP System has been strong. As Richard Colvin wrote in 2000, TAP "is the only model that incorporates all those reforms at once....Lowell Milken, the foundation's co-chairman and architect of the model, said it seeks to motivate the best teachers by rewarding them for their efforts." In 2010, Patricia Hinchey wrote, "Getting Teacher Assessment Right" which stated that the National Education Association (NEA) identified only two promising teacher assessment models in the nation, one being the TAP System. In 2014, President Barack Obama cited the Teacher Advancement Program in South Carolina in a televised speech to the Hispanic Chamber of Commerce as a model for the administration's education initiatives, such as Race to the Top and the Teacher Incentive Fund. Former US Deputy Secretary of Education Ray Simon said of Lowell Milken, "When the history of education for the latter 20th and early 21st centuries is written, it will undoubtedly look upon the efforts of Lowell Milken - especially his groundbreaking successes with the TAP System for Teacher and Student Advancement - as seminal in addressing the core issues of high-quality teaching and learning."

The Lowell Milken Center for Unsung Heroes was established by Lowell Milken in 2007 in partnership with Kansas Milken Educator Norman Conard. The public nonprofit organization discovers, develops and communicates the stories of unsung heroes who have made a profound and positive difference on the course of history and includes a 6,000-square-foot museum space with permanent and rotating exhibitions. In May 2016, the Lowell Milken Center for Unsung Heroes opened a museum in Fort Scott, Kansas.

Milken has partnered with the Prostate Cancer Foundation to present the Lowell Milken Prostate Cancer Foundation Young Investigator Award to scientists for work in the field of prostate cancer.

The Lowell Milken Institute for Business Law and Policy was founded at UCLA School of Law in 2011 with a gift from Milken of $10 million.

In 2014, with an initial endowment of two million dollars from Lowell Milken Family Foundation, the Hoffmitz Milken Center for Typography was established at ArtCenter College of Design in Pasadena, California. In 2017, Milken gave an additional $2 million gift to the Hoffmitz Milken Center.

In 2020, Milken gave a $6.75 million endowment from the Lowell Milken Family Foundation to UCLA to establish the Lowell Milken Center for Music of American Jewish Experience. The center opened in January 2021 as part of the Herb Alpert School of Music. Eileen Strempel, dean of the school of music said of the gift: “We are incredibly grateful to Lowell Milken for his generous gift to endow this center, which builds on our latest learnings, establishes a standard of excellence and an enduring infrastructure at UCLA for music of the American Jewish experience, and gives us the ability to plan more ambitious initiatives for years to come.”

In 2021, Milken donated $3.7 million to establish the Program on Philanthropy and Nonprofits at UCLA School of Law, which focuses on research, training and policy.

In Los Angeles, Milken and the Lowell Milken Family Foundation funded the Aaron Milken Center for Early Childhood Education at Stephen Wise Temple, a campus project announced in 2019 and supported by a US$12 million matching grant from the Lowell Milken Family Foundation that expands the congregation’s preschool and parenting programs. The center, opened in 2025, is named in memory of Milken’s son Aaron and provides early childhood education, parenting classes and communal spaces that reflect the synagogue’s emphasis on Jewish learning and family life.

In 2026, Milken established the American Dream Scholarship at Lipscomb University, a US$10,000 award supporting undergraduate students in political science, American studies, history and journalism who demonstrate academic excellence, civic engagement and ethical leadership; six students were selected as the inaugural recipients for the 2026–27 academic year.

== Business career ==
After graduating from UCLA Law, Milken joined the law firm of Irell & Manella, where he specialized in business and tax law. He spent four years working as an associate at the Los Angeles-based firm. Milken particularly enjoyed and excelled at the tax-study lunches at Irell & Manella, where a senior attorney at the firm presented a complicated case and the lawyers in attendance attempted to come up with unique solutions.

In 1979, he joined Drexel Burnham Lambert's High Yield and Convertible Bond Department, also known as the "junk bond" department. His brother Michael Milken had moved the operation to Los Angeles the year before, and he hired Lowell to serve as a departmental senior vice-president until he resigned in 1989. His duties were reported to be "mostly administrative", but he also provided financial analysis of companies. Lowell was most interested in bankruptcies and distressed finances where he was able to utilize his tax policy experience from Irell & Manella. He was not a registered representative with any securities exchange.

In March 1989, after a long investigation, the government indicted Michael with 98 counts of racketeering and fraud. The indictment also named Lowell in two charges of racketeering and 11 counts of fraud. Michael pleaded guilty and went to prison. As part of that deal, the government dropped all charges against Lowell Milken, but in March 1991, he was barred from working in the securities industry as part of a settlement with the Securities and Exchange Commission. It has been suggested that the government indicted Lowell in order to put pressure on Michael to settle the case against him, a tactic condemned as unethical by some legal scholars. "I am troubled by – and other scholars are troubled by – the notion of putting relatives on the bargaining table," said Vivian Berger, a professor at Columbia University Law School, in a 1990 interview with The New York Times. In articles in the Los Angeles Times and The New York Times published in 1990, Lowell was characterized as an "unassuming family man" being used as a "bargaining chip", indicted only to put pressure on his brother.

In 1992, Lowell Milken funded $1.6 million to back a lawsuit against author James B. Stewart for a passage written in Stewart's book, Den of Thieves, which was about the insider trading scandals during the 1980s. In the lawsuit, Michael F. Armstrong, the criminal defense lawyer who represented Lowell Milken, alleged that the book wrongly accused Armstrong of preparing a false affidavit for a witness to sign to exonerate Lowell Milken. An Associate Justice of the Supreme Court in New York found that the passage concerning Armstrong and the affidavit were true or substantially true and that defendants were protected by the defenses of "opinion" and the "single instance" rule and dismissed the charges.

Lowell has served as chairman of Heron International, a London-based property investment and development company, for over 20 years. Lowell also serves as Chairman of National Realty Trust Inc., the largest property owner of early childhood centers in the United States. In 2020, National Realty Trust raised $415 million of new equity and is now a private real estate investment trust. Milken also is leading more than $1.5 billion of property development and investment in Reno, Nevada. One project, Comstock Commerce Center, is a 688-acre, 7.9 million-plus square-foot development of advanced manufacturing, data center, and logistics.

In 1996, Lowell co-founded Knowledge Universe with Michael Milken and Larry Ellison. In 2003, they became the sole owners of the company. In the United States, Knowledge Universe Education Holdings Inc. became the largest early childhood education company and operated under the KinderCare Learning Centers, Knowledge Beginnings, CCLC, The Grove School, Champions and Cambridge Schools brands. Internationally, it oversees early childhood education, K-12 education and post-secondary education programs and is headquartered in Singapore. Lowell served as vice-chairman of Knowledge Universe Education and he is chairman of Knowledge Universe Education Holdings Inc. In July 2015, Knowledge Universe Education was sold to Switzerland-based Partners Group for undisclosed terms.

== Awards ==
In 2000, Milken was named one of America's most generous philanthropists by Worth magazine. His work in business and philanthropy has been recognized by the National Association of State Boards of Education, the Horace Mann League and the National Association of Secondary School Principals.

During the 2004 event "Only in America: Jewish Music in a Land of Freedom", Milken was honored by the Jewish Theological Seminary of America for his contribution to Jewish culture in the creation of Milken Archive. In 2009, the Hebrew Union College in Los Angeles presented Milken with a Doctor of Humane Letters, honoris causa. Milken was honored as one of UCLA School of Law's 2009 Alumnus of the Year for his accomplishments in public and community service, particularly in the area of education and school reform.

In May 2015, Milken accepted an honorary Doctorate of Humane Letters from Chapman University's George L. Argyros School of Business and Economics at Chapman University. The Education Commission of the States honored Milken as the 2017 recipient of the James Bryant Conant Award. The award is named for the co-founder of Education Commission of the States and former president of Harvard University, and recognizes outstanding individual contributions to American education.

Lowell Milken has been listed for the past eight years in the Los Angeles Business Journal's list of the top 500 most influential people in Los Angeles.
