= Sylvan Learning =

American supplemental education program

Sylvan Learning, Inc.
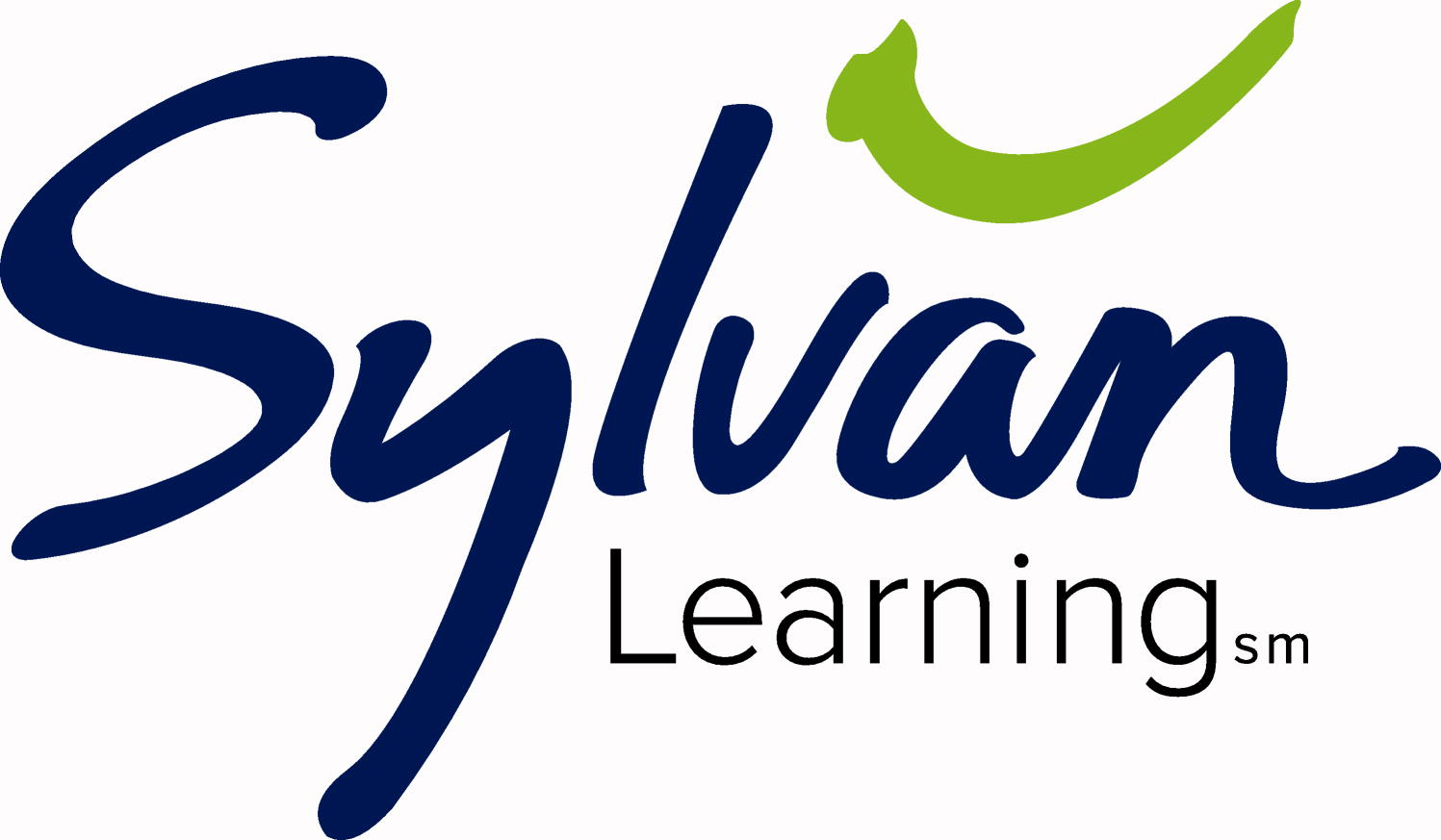
- Type: Subsidiary
- Industry: Education, Tutoring
- Founded: 1979; 47 years ago (as Sylvan Learning Corporation); Portland, Oregon, U.S.
- Headquarters: Baltimore, Maryland, U.S.
- Parent: Unleashed Brands
- Website: sylvanlearning.com

Sylvan Learning, Inc. (formerly Sylvan Learning Corporation) is an American education and tutoring company. It consists of franchised and corporate supplemental learning centers which provide personalized instruction in reading, writing, mathematics, study skills, homework support, and test preparation for college entrance and state exams. Some centers also offer STEM courses in robotics and coding. Sylvan provides personalized learning programs and primarily serves students in primary and secondary education.

== History ==
Sylvan Learning began in Portland, Oregon in 1979 at the Sylvan Hill Medical Center Building. It was founded by former school teacher W. Berry Fowler, who had also worked with the educational company The Reading Game. By 1983, Sylvan had dozens of franchises and moved its headquarters to Bellevue, WA. In 1986, having over 500 franchises, Sylvan went public on the NASDAQ exchange and used funds to develop corporate learning centers in key cities. By July 1987, KinderCare, then based in Montgomery, AL, owned the majority of stock and moved the company to Alabama. Most of the staff did not relocate.

In 1991 the company was taken over by R. Christopher Hoehn-Saric and Douglas L. Becker. In 1997 the company had an annual revenues of $246 million, and in addition to tutoring centers, Sylvan had expanded to offer teacher training, computerized testing, distance learning, and other services.

In 2003, Sylvan Learning was purchased by Apollo Management from Sylvan Learning Systems Inc., its parent company. (Sylvan Learning Systems Inc. shifted focus to post-secondary education, and to reflect that change was renamed Laureate Education in 2004.) In 2016, John McAuliffe was named as Chief Executive Officer.

Over 28 franchised centers located in multiple states closed between 2008 and 2012, some very suddenly. Most Sylvan locations utilize a digital learning system called SylvanSync, which provides lessons on tablets with instructors teaching lessons, which become more independent if the student progresses. Sylvan employs standardized assessments to place and monitor students and to evaluate instructors.

== See also ==
- Storefront school

== Bibliography ==
- Ritzer, George (1996). The McDonaldization of Society: An Investigation into the Changing Character of Contemporary Social Life (Revised ed.). Thousand Oaks, California: Pine Forge Press.
