= Mordechai Hershman =

American singer

Mordecai Hershman
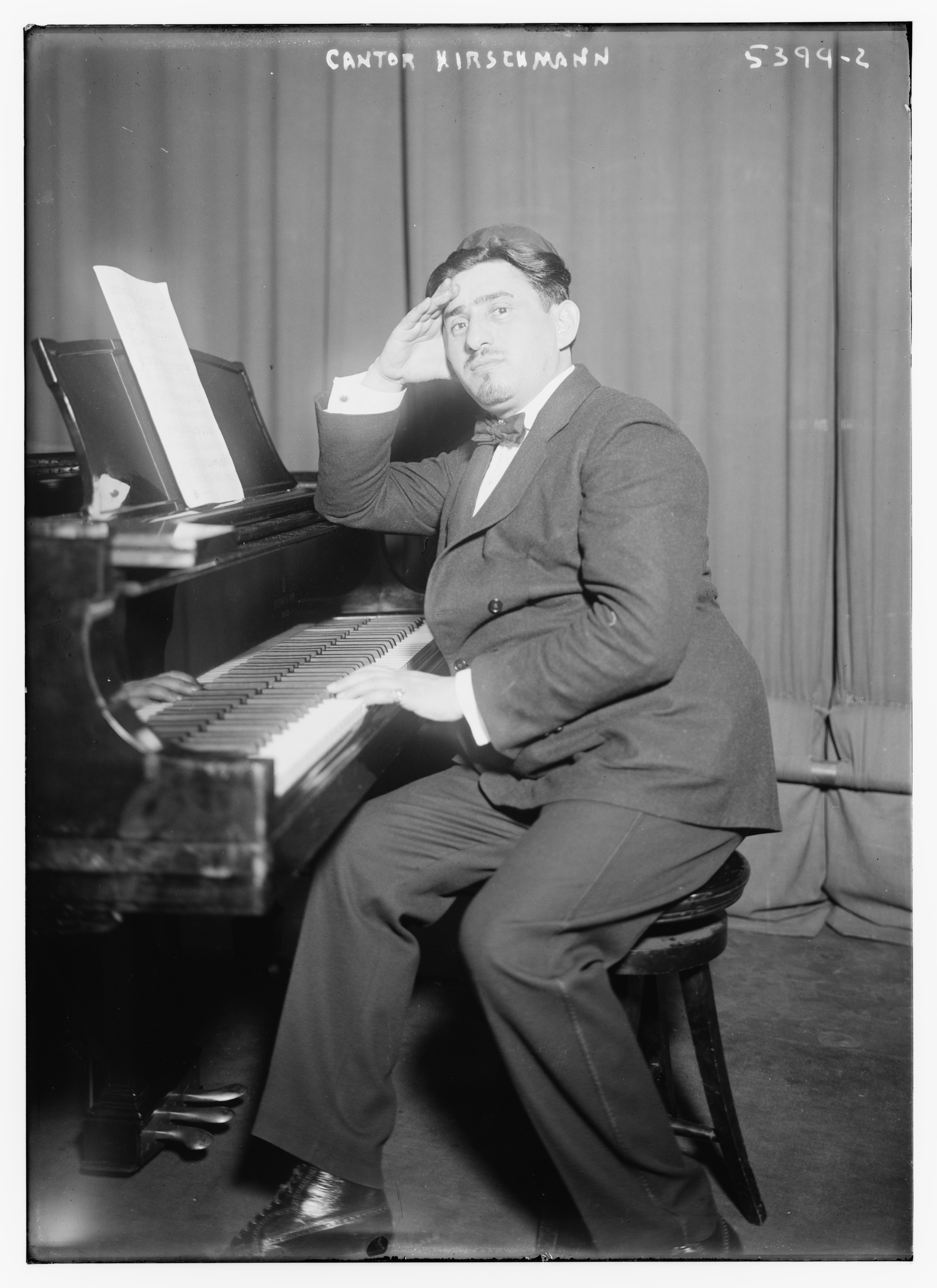
- Born: 1888; Chernihiv, Russian Empire (present-day Ukraine)
- Died: January 30, 1941
- Occupations: Cantor (hazzan); singer
- Known for: Leading figure of the "golden age" of Ashkenazic cantorial music

Mordecai Hershman (1888 – January 30, 1941) was a Ukrainian-born American Jewish cantor (hazzan) and a leading figure of the early twentieth-century "golden age" of Ashkenazic cantorial music. After holding prominent cantorial posts in the Russian Empire, he emigrated to the United States in 1920 and became chief cantor of Beth El Temple in Brooklyn. Known for his warm tenor voice, concert tours, and influential recordings of liturgical and Yiddish music, he remains one of the best-known cantors of his era.

== Biography ==
Mordechai Hershman was born in Chernihiv in the Chernigov Governorate of the Russian Empire (present-day Ukraine). His father, who was a glass merchant, died when he was six years old, and he came to live with foster parents. Neither his father nor his foster family encouraged his interest in music; however, he was able to prevail upon his foster parents to allow him to take lessons from the cantor at the local synagogue. At age 12 he was adopted by his grandfather, who moved with him to Solovio, where he continued his training under Cantor Dorfman. In 1904 he was appointed to the post of hazzan in Zhytomyr, but he stayed there for only a few months before he was offered a position as assistant hazzan of Vilna. After several years the principal hazzan died and Hershman was appointed to the position.

During World War I, Hershman was drafted into the Russian Army. Legend has it that his commanding officer was so impressed by his tenor voice that he released him from his duties. After the war, Hershman returned to his post in Vilna. The community granted him leave to lead the services on only two Sabbaths a month so that he could tour and give concerts for the rest of the time. Hershman appeared throughout Europe, singing both liturgical works and operatic arias.

In 1920, Hershman emigrated to the United States, where he took up the position as chief hazzan at the Beth El Temple in Brooklyn, New York. He held that post for ten years. During his time at Beth El Temple and afterwards, he toured throughout America, Europe, and Palestine. As was customary for noted hazzanim of the time, Hershman released several records of cantorial and Jewish folk music.

Hershman died in 1941.

== Hershman's voice ==
Hershman ranks among the great cantors of the golden age of Jewish cantorial music at the start of the twentieth century. His mellow tenor voice thrilled his audiences, and his cantorial arias have become classics of the Ashkenazic cantorial repertoire. Some of his most famous melodies are "Aylu Devarim", "Akavia ben Mahalael" and "Modim Anachnu Loch". In addition to liturgical material, Hershman also recorded Yiddish songs and opera selections. Many of his liturgical recordings were composed by the noted composer Yaakov (Jacob) Rapoport. Hershman himself did not compose music. In 1925, Pinchas Yasinovski composed a piece for Hershman entitled "At the end of days" ("Vehaya Beacharit Hayamim"), for the inauguration of the Hebrew University campus at Mount Scopus, near Jerusalem. The text is from the Book of Isaiah and the tune is based on traditional cantillation notes. Hershman recorded the piece in the United States, accompanied by strings and wind instruments, and it is considered one of his finest recordings.
