= Moshe Koussevitzky =

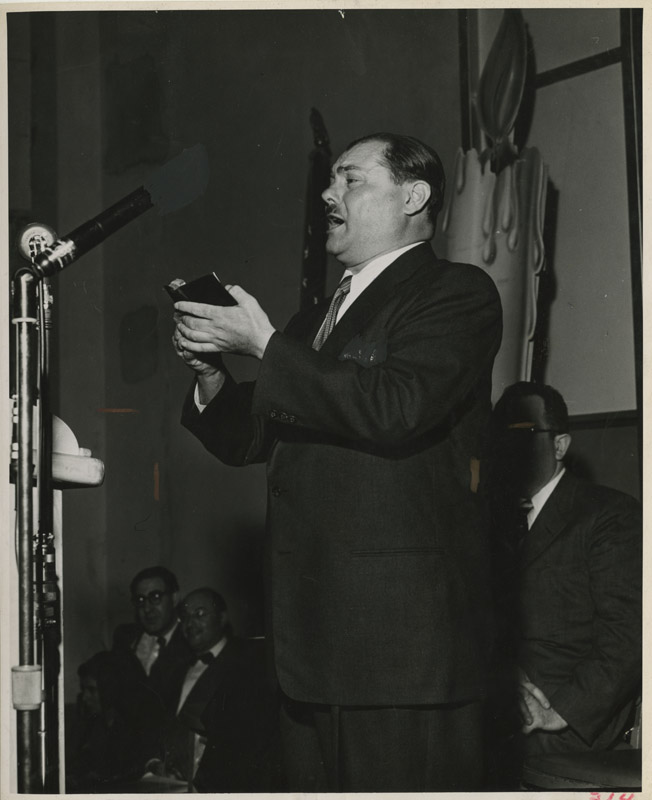
Koussevitzky in 1953

Moshe Koussevitzky (Hebrew: משה קוסביצקי, Polish: Mosze Kusewicki; June 9, 1899, in Smarhoń, Russian Empire – August 23, 1966, in New York City) was a cantor and vocalist. A relative of noted conductor Sergei Koussevitzky, he made many recordings in Poland and the United States.

Moshe Koussevitzky was a lyric tenor with a spectacular and perhaps unparalleled upper register among cantors. Koussevitzky is regarded as among the greatest cantors of the 20th century. Some would place him first among peers, though that distinction is more often given to Yossele Rosenblatt or Gershon Sirota, both of whom were a generation older than Koussevitzky.

== Early life and career ==
Koussevitzky was born in Smarhoń, now located in Belarus, on June 9, 1899; his father, Avigdor, was a music teacher and his mother, Alta, a pianist. He moved to Vilna in 1920, and served there as cantor at the Sawel Synagogue, and, starting in 1924, at the Great Synagogue of Vilna. In 1927 or 1928 he became cantor of the Tlomackie Synagogue in Warsaw, succeeding Gershon Sirota. He soon gained an international reputation, traveling to Brussels, Antwerp, Vienna, Budapest and London. In 1934 and 1936, he performed in Israel. Koussevitzky first performed in the United States in 1938, at New York's Carnegie Hall.

Koussevitzky and his family escaped the Nazis during the Holocaust by fleeing to the Soviet Union. During the war years, he performed as an opera singer under the name Mikhail Koswitzky, appearing in Boris Godunov, Tosca and Rigoletto, and was honored for his contributions to national morale.

== Post-war career and legacy ==
After the war, he returned to Poland, and the audience at one of his concerts included the ambassadors from the United Kingdom and the United States. Following this concert he was granted a visa to the United Kingdom, where he stayed for a short time before emigrating in 1947 to the United States with his family. He became cantor of Borough Park, Brooklyn's Temple Beth-El in 1952, living in Great Neck, Long Island during the week and in Borough Park on the Sabbath. He died on August 23, 1966, and was buried in Israel.

Koussevitzky was one of four brothers, all well-known cantors. David Koussevitzky was cantor of a Conservative synagogue, Temple Emanu-El of Borough Park, one block from Moshe's Beth-El. After Moshe's death, David would continue the tradition Moshe had started of giving an annual concert at Beth-El on Rosh Chodesh Elul, one month before Rosh Hashanah. Jacob and Simcha were also prominent cantors, albeit not as well known as Moshe and David. Jacob held positions in Kremenetze, Lemberg, London, Winnipeg, and finally Kew Gardens Hills, Queens, New York.
