= Kidder, Peabody & Company =

American securities firm

Kidder, Peabody & Co.
- Industry: Investment banking
- Founded: 1865; 161 years ago
- Defunct: 1994; 32 years ago
- Fate: Acquired by PaineWebber
- Headquarters: Boston, Massachusetts, U.S.
- Products: Financial services

Kidder, Peabody & Co. was an American securities firm, established in Massachusetts in 1865. The firm's operations included investment banking, brokerage, and trading.

The firm was sold to General Electric in 1986. Following heavy losses, it was subsequently sold to Paine Webber in 1994. After the acquisition by PaineWebber, the Kidder Peabody name was dropped, ending the firm's 130-year presence on Wall Street. Most of what was once Kidder Peabody is now part of UBS AG, which acquired PaineWebber in November 2000.

== History ==
=== Early history ===
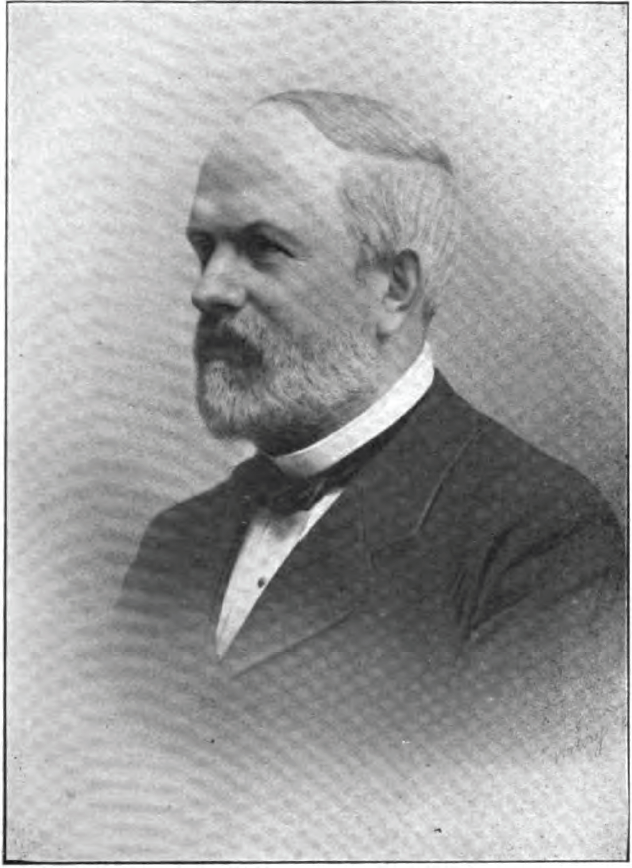
Henry P. Kidder

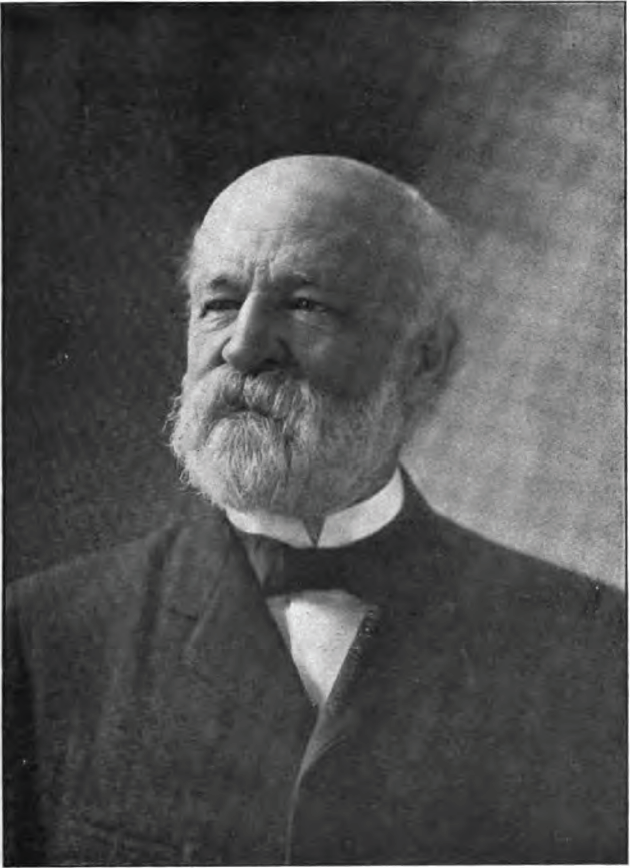
Francis H. Peabody

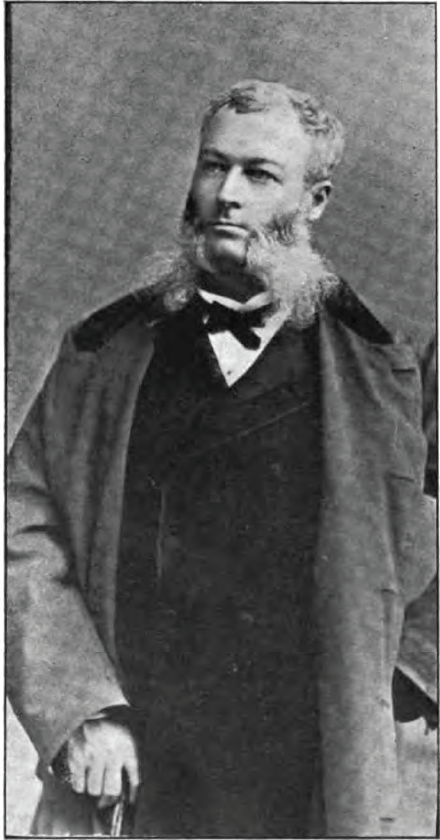
Oliver W. Peabody

Company founders Henry P. Kidder and Francis and Oliver Peabody

Kidder, Peabody & Co. was established in April 1865 by Henry P. Kidder, Francis H. Peabody, and Oliver W. Peabody. The firm was formed via reorganization of its predecessor company, J.E. Thayer & Brother, where the three founders had previously worked as clerks.

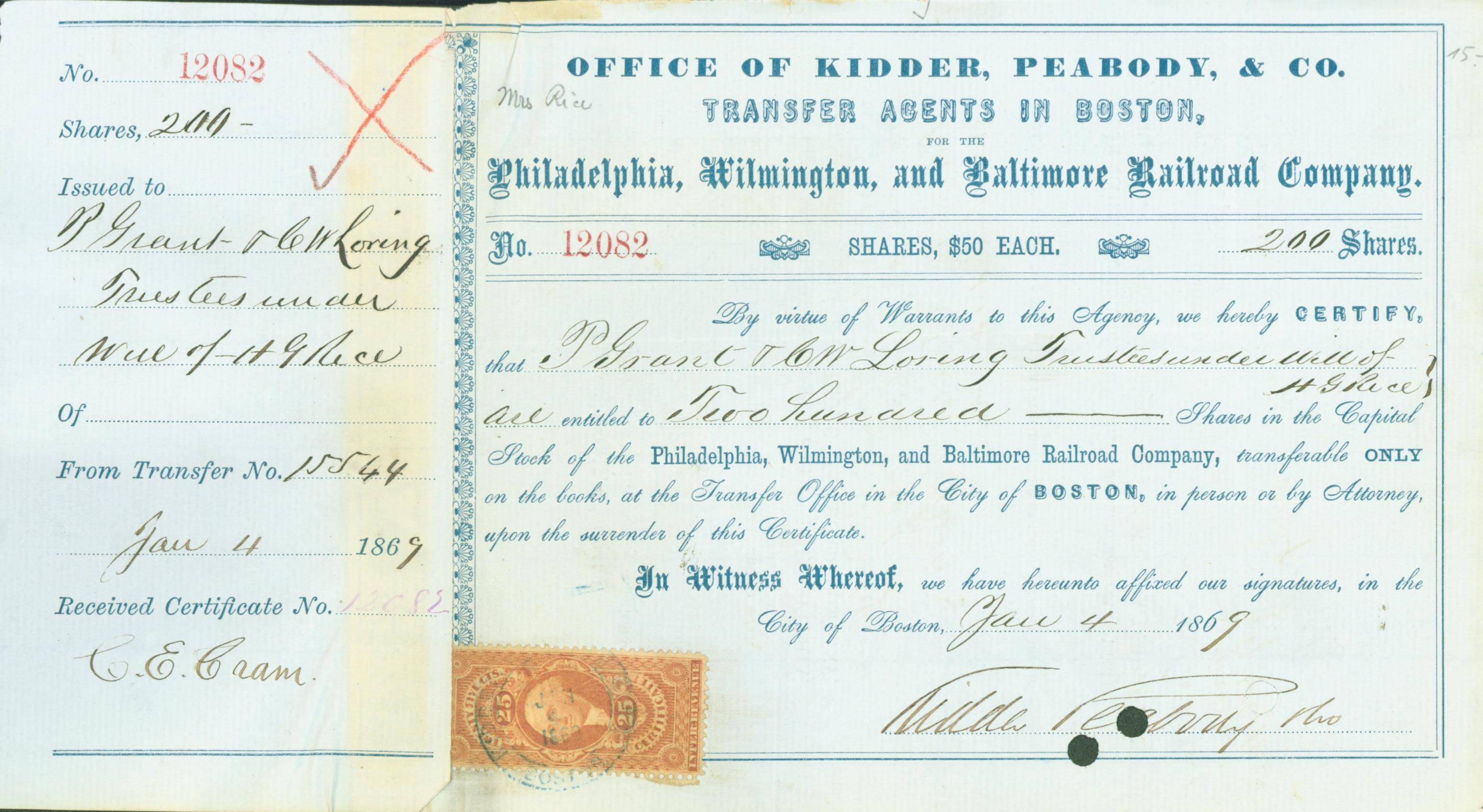
1869 was Kidder, Peabody & Company transfer agent for the Philadelphia, Wilmington and Baltimore Railroad in Boston

Kidder Peabody acted as a commercial bank, investment bank, and merchant bank. The firm had an active securities business, dealing in treasury bonds and municipal bonds, as well as corporate bonds and stocks.

In the aftermath of the 1929 stock market crash, Kidder Peabody was in a perilous situation. In 1931, Albert H. Gordon bought the struggling firm with financial backing from Stone & Webster. Since electric utilities were considered somewhat risky, Stone & Webster set up its own investment banking operation to finance its own projects through bond sales. Many of the utilities were municipally owned, and Stone & Webster's investment banking unit served them in other offerings. Eventually, as fewer investment banking clients were engineering clients, there was an incentive to divest and merge the unit with another investment bank. Edwin Webster's father, Frank G. Webster, was a senior partner of Kidder Peabody, and Kidder had actively supported Charles A. Stone and Edwin as they started The Massachusetts Electrical Engineering Company, which later became Stone & Webster, in the 1890s. Gordon helped rebuild Kidder Peabody by focusing on specific niche markets including utility finance and municipal bonds. Stone & Webster had thus become an integrated company which designed utility projects, built them, financed them, and operated them for municipalities.

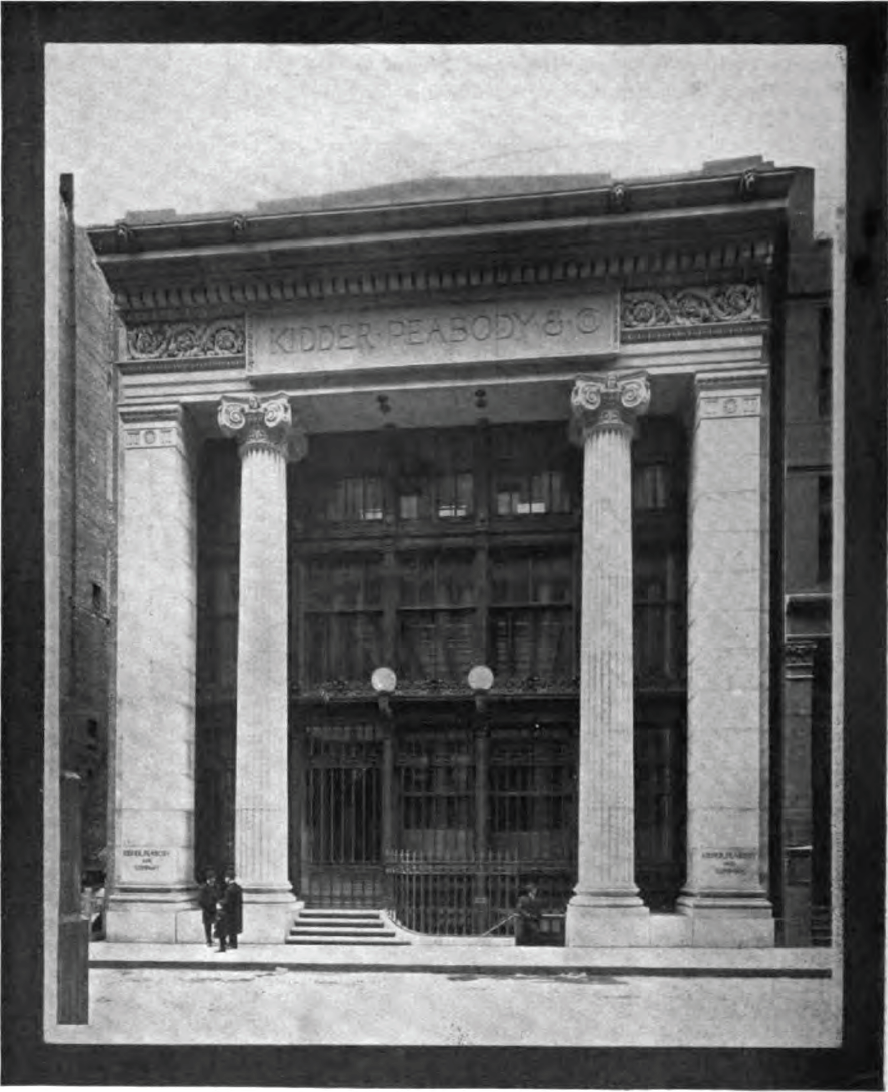
Kidder Peabody's offices on Devonshire Street in Boston c. 1908

In 1967, Kidder Peabody helped to arrange a deal whereby the USDA's Commodity Credit Corporation invested $21.8 million in the failing Lebanese Intra Bank, a cornerstone of the Lebanese banking industry. This move likely contributed to preventing a major financial crisis in Lebanon from worsening.

=== In the 1970s – R&D and finance ===
Kidder Peabody was among the first Wall Street firms to start and dedicate an entire department to financial research and development. In the Late 1970s, it hired Yale Professor John Geanakoplos to start an R&D department to research and analyse the connection between finance and mathematics. Gradually the department grew to contain 75 prominent academics, and continued to function till Kidder Peabody's closure.

=== Kidder and the 1980s insider trading scandal ===
Gordon served as Kidder's chairman until selling it to General Electric in 1986. GE believed that Kidder would be a good fit for its financial services division, GE Capital. GE executives had felt chagrin at putting up money to finance leveraged buyouts, only to have to pay large fees to other investment banks. GE believed that it made sense to find a way to keep these fees for itself after taking such expensive risks. Thus, when Gordon concluded that Kidder could not stay independent, he found a receptive ear in GE chairman Jack Welch. GE initially left the firm in the hands of Gordon's longtime heir apparent, Ralph DeNunzio.

Soon after the GE purchase, a skein of insider trading scandals, which came to define the Street of the 1980s and were depicted in the James B. Stewart bestseller Den of Thieves, swept Wall Street. The firm was implicated when former Kidder Peabody executive and merger specialist Martin Siegel—who had since become head of mergers and acquisitions at Drexel Burnham Lambert—admitted to trading on inside information with super-arbitrageurs Ivan Boesky and Robert Freeman. Siegel also implicated Richard Wigton, Kidder's chief arbitrageur. Wigton was the only executive handcuffed in his office as part of the trading scandal, an act that was later depicted in the movie Wall Street.

With Rudy Giuliani, then the United States Attorney for the Southern District of New York, threatening to indict the firm, Kidder was initially poised to fight the government. However, GE officials were somewhat less inclined to fight, given that Siegel had admitted wrongdoing. A GE internal review concluded that DeNunzio and other executives had not done enough to prevent the improper sharing of information and also revealed glaring weaknesses in the firm's internal controls. Notably, Siegel was able to move about the trading floor as he pleased, and Wigton and Tabor made Siegel-requested trades with almost no questions asked. In response, GE fired DeNunzio and two other senior executives, stopped trading for its own account, and agreed to a $25.3 million settlement with the SEC.

Years later, in his autobiography, Jack: Straight from the Gut, Welch said that the aftermath of the insider trading scandal led him to conclude that buying Kidder had been a mistake. He was appalled by the firm's outsize bonus pool, which was $40 million greater than the GE corporate pool at the time even though Kidder accounted for only 0.05 percent of GE's income. He also didn't understand how "mediocre people" were garnering such high bonuses. Soon after Black Monday, Welch and other GE executives resolved to sell off Kidder at the first opportunity that they could do so "without losing our shirt."

=== 1994 bond trading scandal ===
Kidder Peabody was later involved in a trading scandal related to false profits booked from 1990 to 1994. Joseph Jett, a trader on the government bond desk, was found to have systematically exploited a flaw in Kidder's computer systems, generating large false profits. When the fraud was discovered, it was determined that Jett's claimed profits of $275 million over four years had actually been a $75 million loss.

The NYSE barred Jett from securities trading or working for any firm affiliated with the exchange, a move that effectively banned him from the securities industry. The SEC subsequently formalized his ban from the industry, and ultimately concluded that Jett's actions amounted to securities fraud.

Jett's implosion forced GE to take a $210 million charge to its first-quarter earnings ($350 million before taxes). Years later, Welch recalled that GE business leaders were so shaken by the huge loss that they offered to dip into the coffers of their own divisions to close the gap. In contrast, Welch said, no one at Kidder was willing to take responsibility for the debacle.

Although Kidder had rebuilt itself with mortgage-backed bonds, negative media coverage following the disclosure of Jett's overstated profits led GE to sell most of Kidder Peabody's assets to PaineWebber for $670 million, in October 1994. The transaction closed in January 1995, and the Kidder Peabody name was retired.

Years later, Welch claimed that the Jett debacle was a reminder that Kidder had been "a headache and an embarrassment from the start" for GE. Earlier, several GE board members with experience in financial services, such as Walter Wriston of Citicorp and Lewis Preston of J.P. Morgan, had warned him that a securities firm was very different from other GE businesses; as Wriston put it, "all you're buying is the furniture." The experience led Welch to pass on numerous other acquisition opportunities for GE that made strategic sense on paper after he concluded that they didn't fit with GE's culture.

== Associated people ==
- Prince Abbas Hilmi, Vice President of Kidder, Peabody & Co. / Executive Director of Kidder, Peabody International Investments (1986–1989)
- Jack Langer (born 1948/1949), basketball player and investment banker
- Lloyd B. Waring, Vice President of Kidder, Peabody & Co.
- Christian Gerhartsreiter, serial impostor, was briefly employed at Kidder, Peabody & Co. under the alias "Christopher C. Crowe" in the late 1980s.
- Roger Tamraz

== See also ==
- General Electric
- Joseph Jett
- Martin A. Siegel
- Paine Webber
