= Milken Institute =

Economic think tank based in California, US

The Milken Institute
- Formation: 1991; 35 years ago
- Founder: Michael Milken
- Type: Economic Think tank
- Headquarters: Santa Monica, California, United States
- Region served: Global
- Leader: Michael Milken (Chairman)
- Revenue: $47,638,129 (2016)
- Expenses: $42,559,621 (2016)
- Website: www.milkeninstitute.org

The Milken Institute is an American independent, nonpartisan economic think tank based in Santa Monica, California, with offices in Washington, D.C., New York, Miami, London, Abu Dhabi, and Singapore. Founded by Michael Milken, it publishes research and hosts conferences that apply market-based principles and financial innovations to social issues in the United States and internationally. The institute is a 501(c)(3) nonprofit organization and presents itself as non-ideological. It is also affiliated with the Milken Center for Advancing the American Dream.

== History ==
The institute was founded in 1991 by Michael Milken, a former Drexel Burnham Lambert banker who achieved financial success as a pioneer of "junk bonds," but attracted notoriety due to his subsequent felony conviction and prison sentence for U.S. securities law violations. Milken formalized his philanthropic giving by founding the institute, with a mission to “increase global prosperity by advancing collaborative solutions that widen access to capital, create jobs, and improve health." Milken's philanthropic endeavors also include the Milken Family Foundation and the Prostate Cancer Foundation. The latter was founded in 1993 after Milken's own prostate cancer diagnosis.

== Research and events ==
The Milken Institute's work is organized around four pillars: finance, health, strategic philanthropy, and the international arm of the Institute. The institute has published studies relating to human capital, access to capital, financial structures and innovations, regional economics, healthcare economics, and medical research. It hosts a series of conferences, financial innovation labs, forums, and private events. The Milken Institute hosts several events on annual basis, including regional summits like the Asia Summit and the Middle East and Africa (MEA) Summit, as well as regional investors' symposiums. The Global Investors' Symposium series of events have taken place in Hong Kong, Sao Paulo, and Mexico City. Other Milken Institute annual events are the Global Conference, the Future of Health Summit, and the Future of Finance (previously called the Finance Forum). The Milken Institute Global Conference, first held in 1998, is an annual forum focused on economic and social issues.

=== Health ===
Milken Institute Health is a division of the Milken Institute focused on advancing research, policy, and programs to address complex health challenges in the United States and globally. Its work spans four primary areas: biomedical innovation, public health, healthy aging, and food systems, with an emphasis on identifying promising practices and scaling evidence-based solutions to improve health outcomes and resilience.

=== Tax policy ===
The institute has held several events regarding opportunity zones created by the Tax Cuts and Jobs Act of 2017. In May 2018, Treasury Secretary Steven Mnuchin instructed his staff to accept a non-low-income tract in Storey County, Nevada as an Opportunity Zone shortly after attending an Institute event in Beverly Hills with Michael Milken. Milken was already an investor in the Nevada tract. In August 2018, Mnuchin attended an Institute conference on opportunity zones in the Hamptons with Milken and later accepted a flight to Los Angeles with Milken on his private jet. Treasury later issued a regulatory guidance at the institute's request that allows prior investors to benefit from newly designated opportunity zones.

== Milken Scholars Program ==
The Milken Scholars Program is a joint initiative between the Milken Institute and the Milken Family Foundation. The program was founded in 1989. More than 600 Milken scholars have been selected from more than 100 high schools in Los Angeles County, New York City, and Washington, D.C.

== Milken Center for Advancing the American Dream ==
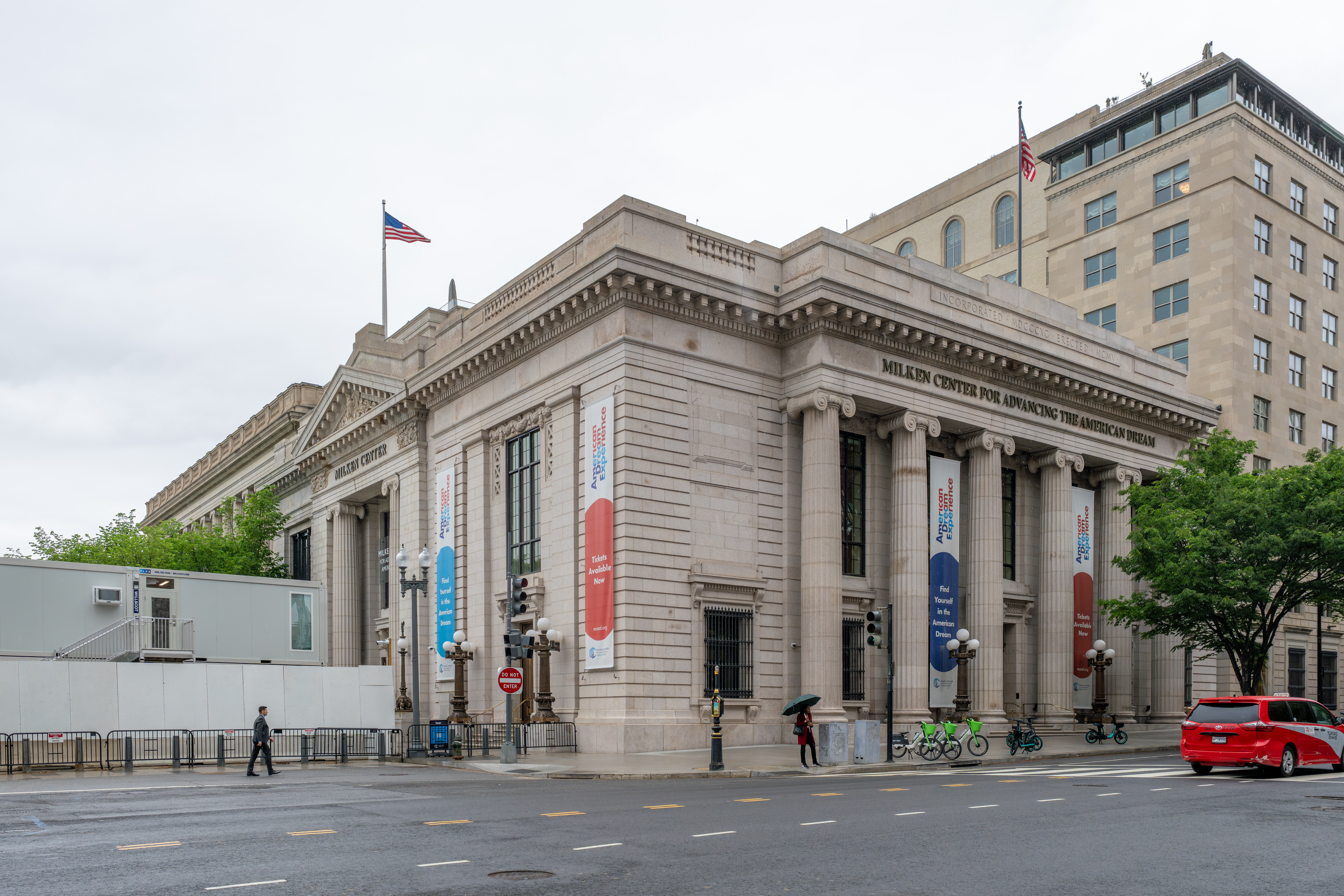
Milken Center for Advancing the American Dream (2026)

In September 2025, Milken opened the Milken Center for Advancing the American Dream (MCAAD) in Washington, D.C., combining five buildings on 15th Street next to the White House. An interactive museum, MCAAD's exhibits and galleries feature artists, entrepreneurs, and innovators in health and education, among others. The museum also highlights the U.S. financial system.

In 2026, MCAAD was named one of USA Today's "10 Best New Museums." The museum also partners with major companies such as Home Depot.

== See also ==
- Milken Family Foundation
