= Robert M. Freeman =

Convicted white-collar criminal

Robert M. Freeman (born ~1943) is an American stock broker and convicted felon who was a Goldman, Sachs & Co. partner. Freeman admitted to trading on inside information and pled guilty to mail fraud in 1989.

The head of arbitrage at Goldman Sachs & Co., he was identified as a possible target in an insider trading scandal in November 1986, and arrested on February 12, 1987. The case was prosecuted by Rudolph Giuliani, then United States Attorney for the Southern District. According to the prosecutor, the case involved insider-trading information bought by Ivan Boesky from Martin A. Siegel, of Kidder, Peabody, who in turn got his information from Freeman. Freeman eventually pleaded guilty to one count of mail fraud, served four months in Federal Prison Camp, Pensacola at Saufley Field, Florida. On June 7, 1993, he agreed with the SEC to a three-year suspension from the securities industry and to surrender $1.1 million, in connection with the 1986 leveraged buyout of Beatrice Companies Inc. by Kohlberg Kravis Roberts.

In 2011, New York Times blogger William D. Cohan wrote that Freeman was an innocent victim of a prosecutorial "witch hunt," whose mail fraud conviction was unconnected to any insider trading. In reply, Seeking Alpha author Jonathan Bernstein described Freeman as a "guilty bystander" in the search for evidence against Ivan Boesky and Michael Milken. According to Bernstein, Freeman's mail fraud conviction "was actually about insider trading".
