= Henry Sturgis Morgan Jr. =

American naval officer (1924–2011)

Personal details
- Born: August 10, 1924 Oyster Bay, New York, US
- Died: May 6, 2011 (aged 86) Annapolis, Maryland, US
- Spouse(s): Fanny Gray Little (m. 1945; div. 1972) Jean Alexandra McCain (m. 1973–2011)
- Children: 4
- Parent: Henry Sturgis Morgan (father)
- Relatives: Morgan family
- Education: Harvard University (1946); George Washington University (Law)
- Occupation: Admiralty law
- Military career
- Burial place: Arlington National Cemetery
- Allegiance: United States
- Branch: United States Navy
- Service years: 1944–1975
- Rank: Rear Admiral
- Unit: retirement in 1975
- Commands: USS Tusk (SS-426); USS Fulton (AS-11); USS Providence (CL-82); Fourteenth Naval District; U.S. Naval Forces Korea
- Conflicts: World War II; Korean War; Vietnam War

Henry Sturgis Morgan Jr. (August 10, 1924 – May 6, 2011) was a United States Navy rear admiral and maritime lawyer. Through his father, Morgan Stanley co-founder Henry Sturgis Morgan Sr., he was a great-grandson of J. P. Morgan, founder of J.P. Morgan & Co.

== Early life ==
Henry Sturgis Morgan Jr. was born August 10, 1924, in Oyster Bay, New York to Henry Sturgis Morgan Sr. (1900–1982) and Catherine Frances Lovering Adams (1902–1988), the daughter of Frances Lovering and Charles Francis Adams III, the U.S. Secretary of the Navy under Herbert Hoover, and a descendant of U.S. Presidents John Adams and John Quincy Adams. His younger brother was John Adams Morgan (1930–2025).

Morgan graduated Groton School and Harvard University class of 1946.

== Career ==
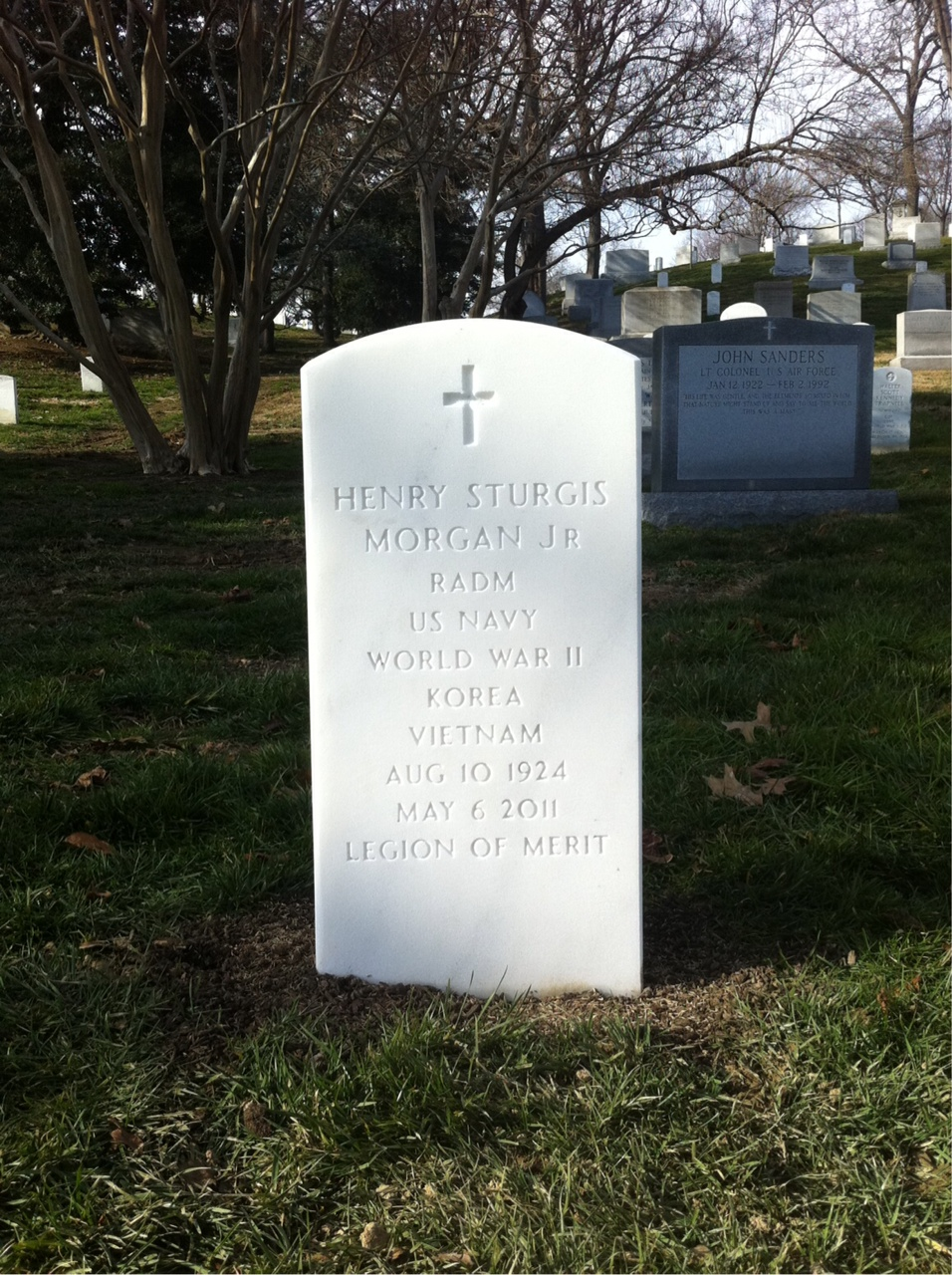
Grave at Arlington National Cemetery

Morgan joined the Navy in 1942 and was commissioned in 1944. Morgan commanded USS Tusk (SS-426) from June 29, 1957, to May 4, 1959; USS Fulton (AS-11) from May 25, 1966, to February 7, 1968; USS Providence (CLG-6) from February 3 to June 22, 1971; the Fourteenth Naval District, Pearl Harbor beginning in December 1971 and was Commander Naval Forces Korea from June 1972 to April 1975.

Morgan received the Legion of Merit.

Morgan practiced maritime law as of counsel to the Admiralty practice group of the firm Vinson & Elkins for twelve years, from 1978 to 1990.

== Personal life ==
On March 28, 1945, he married Fanny Gray Little of Chestnut Hill, Massachusetts. Before their divorce in 1972, they had four children:

- Catherine Adams Morgan, who married Alec Mitchell Peltier in 1967.
- Henry Sturgis Morgan III (b. 1948)
- Polly Morgan, who married John M. Timken Jr. in 1979.
- Joan Morgan, who married Peter Lincoln Folsom in 1973.

His second wife was Jean Alexandra McCain (1934–2019), daughter of Admiral John S. McCain, Jr. (1911–1981) and sister of U.S. Senator John McCain (1936–2018), and was married to her for 38 years until his death. He died in Annapolis, Maryland, on May 6, 2011, aged 86, and was buried at Arlington National Cemetery.
