= Martin A. Siegel =

American former investment banker (born 1948)

Martin A. Siegel (born 1948) is an American former investment banker who was convicted, along with Ivan Boesky and Michael Milken, for insider trading during the 1980s.

== Biography ==
Born to a Jewish family, Siegel is a graduate of Harvard Business School. In 1971, he joined Kidder, Peabody & Co. and, during his 15 years at the firm, became known as a takeover specialist. In February 1986, he left Kidder to become a managing director at Drexel Burnham Lambert.

On February 13, 1987, Siegel pleaded guilty to one count of conspiracy to violate the securities laws and one count of tax evasion. His guilty plea included an agreement to pay over US$9 million in civil penalties and forfeit $10 million more in bonuses and stock owed to him by Drexel—a sum many times greater than the illegal gains from his relationship with Boesky. He received a sentence of two months' imprisonment and five years' probation, rather than ten years, with 3,000 hours of community service. The sentence was light because of his cooperation with other government investigations. His involvement in criminal activities is recounted in the book Den of Thieves by Pulitzer Prize-winning author James B. Stewart.

Siegel now lives in Ponte Vedra Beach, Florida.
