= John A. Mulheren =

American businessman, investor and philanthropist (1949–2003)

- Born: June 20, 1949; The Bronx, New York
- Died: December 15, 2003 (aged 54); Rumson, New Jersey
- Education: Roanoke College
- Occupation: CEO of Bear Wagner Specialists

John A. Mulheren Jr. (June 20, 1949 in The Bronx, New York — December 15, 2003 in Rumson, New Jersey) was an American businessman, investor, and philanthropist.

== Biography ==
Born in the Bronx, Mulheren was a Wall Street icon who earned millions in the 1980s as a stock and option trader. Mulheren became a managing director for Merrill Lynch at age 25 and later became the chief executive of Bear Wagner Specialists, one of seven NYSE specialist trading firms. He owned the Chapel Beach Club located in Sea Bright, New Jersey and Crazees Ice Cream in Rumson, New Jersey.

A protégé of Ivan Boesky, Mulheren was implicated in the insider trading scandals of the late 1980s and was convicted on fraud and conspiracy charges in 1990. Mulheren's involvement in the scandals and his relationship with Boesky are discussed with great detail in Den of Thieves by James B. Stewart. Upon learning that Boesky had implicated him in the scandal, Mulheren reportedly set out to kill Boesky. Mulheren's conviction was overturned by the Second Circuit Court of Appeals in 1991.

Mulheren graduated from Roanoke College in 1971. He donated millions to the college naming several buildings after former professors and mentors. The entrance to the college is named "John's Bridge" in his honor. Mulheren's widow, Nancy, is a college trustee.

Mulheren suffered from bipolar disorder. He died of cardiac arrest that followed a seizure he suffered at his Bingham Drive home on December 15, 2003. Bruce Springsteen, a close friend, performed at the funeral.
