= Highly confident letter =

Financing tool

The "highly confident letter" was a financing tool created by investment bankers at Drexel Burnham Lambert, dominated by Michael Milken, in the 1980s. Its objective was to enable corporate raiders to launch leveraged buyout (LBO) offers without the debt component of their financing package fully in place.

== Origins ==
The letter was first crafted in 1983 for use in Carl Icahn's attempt to take ownership of Phillips 66. The conventional wisdom was that due to Icahn's reputation as a takeover artist combined with the junk bond's perception as below investment grade paper, no bank would want to commit the cash necessary to augment any bonds Drexel would raise. Leon Black, Drexel's lead investment banker on the deal, proposed that Drexel write a letter advising the banks that it was "highly confident" that it would be able to raise the required debt in time to fulfill Icahn's obligations. A large portion of the debt financing would be composed of junk bonds raised by Milken. In essence, Drexel, as principal underwriter of the debt, would not actually raise the money, but promised that it could.

The highly confident letter had no legal status. Nonetheless, by this time Drexel, or more precisely, Milken, had gained a reputation for being able to make markets for any bonds it sold. Thus, its ability to raise the huge amounts of leverage that were required for LBOs was widely taken for granted in the markets during those days. Drexel's senior management saw this as a win-win situation for the firm. If it worked, it would be a valuable tool in future deals; if it didn't, Drexel wouldn't suffer any significant losses.

Icahn did not actually win control of Phillips, but made enough of a profit that the deal was considered an unqualified success for Drexel. The highly confident letter was used on several more occasions over the years. Given Drexel's reputation, it was considered as good as cash for corporate raiders in the 1980s.

== Usage ==
On May 3, 2026, GameStop made an US$56 billion offer to acquire eBay, with a highly confident letter from TD Bank to provide about US$20 billion in debt financing. eBay rejected the offer a week later.

== Bibliography ==
- Kornbluth, Jesse (1992). Highly confident: the crime and punishment of Michael Milken (1 ed.). New York: Morrow. ISBN 0-688-10937-3.
