= Harriman, Ripley and Company =

Harriman, Ripley and Company was an investment bank created by the partners of Brown Brothers Harriman after the passage of the Glass Steagall Act mandated firewalls between commercial banks and investment banks. Brown Brothers Harriman positioned itself into a private bank while Harriman Ripley engaged in the marketing and underwriting of securities. Employees were recruited primarily from Brown Brothers Harriman, and also from the National City Bank.

Harriman Ripley maintained offices in Boston, Chicago, New York and Philadelphia. E. Roland Harriman and W. Averell Harriman owned the company outright until 1946, when it was reorganized and the brothers wound up with 97% of the non-voting stock and 43% of the voting stock. The firm is also named for Joseph P. Ripley.

In 1965, the firm merged with the fellow "white shoe firm" Drexel and Company, creating Drexel Harriman Ripley. In the mid-1970s, it sold a 25 percent stake to Firestone Tire and Rubber Company, renaming itself Drexel Firestone.

In 1973, Drexel Firestone merged with Burnham & Co. to form Drexel Burnham & Co. Even though Burnham was the dominant partner and nominal survivor, the firms in the "special" and "major" brackets insisted that the Drexel name come first as a condition of allowing the merged firm to inherit the old Drexel's place in the "major" bracket. Since the new firm needed the informal blessing of the larger firms to survive, Burnham had no choice but to agree. Drexel Burnham became Drexel Burnham Lambert after the 1976 absorption of the boutique investment research firm William D. Witter.

Michael Milken, later to become famous as the "junk bond king," began his career at Drexel Firestone, having previously interned at the firm during his days at the Wharton School. After the merger with Burnham, Milken was one of the few senior executives from the old Drexel.
