= The Partners (book) =

Book by James B. Stewart

The Partners: Inside America's Most Powerful Law Firms
- Front cover
- Author: James B. Stewart
- Language: English
- Subject: Law
- Publisher: Simon & Schuster
- Publication date: 1983
- Publication place: United States
- Media type: Hardcover
- Pages: 395
- ISBN: 0-671-42023-2
- OCLC: 8785200
- Dewey Decimal: 338.7/6134973 s 338.7/613473 19
- LC Class: KF300 .S73 1983

The Partners: Inside America's Most Powerful Law Firms (1983) is a non-fiction book by James B. Stewart. The book is a product of two years of investigation of the role of prominent law firms in society. The book describes and discusses several famous cases. There have been five editions of the book as of 2008.

== Contents ==
- Part One. Iran — Shearman & Sterling, Davis Polk & Wardwell
- Part Two. IBM — Cravath, Swaine & Moore
- Part Three. Genentech — Pillsbury, Madison & Sutro
- Part Four. Westinghouse — Kirkland & Ellis
- Part Five. Chrysler — Debevoise, Plimpton, Lyons & Gates
- Part Six. Kennecott — Sullivan & Cromwell
- Part Seven. Rockefeller — Milbank, Tweed, Hadley & McCloy
- Part Eight. Kodak — Donovan, Leisure, Newton & Irvine

== History ==
According to the New York Times, it covers instances in 1980s law firms such as "the story of how Nelson Rockefeller's last will and testament was prepared and executed by the law firm of Milbank, Tweed, Hadley & McCloy, and the embarrassment of the fact that Megan Marshack's name appeared in it."

Noting the longevity of large law firms, The Economist wrote in 2023 that "with a few exceptions, the book’s starring firms remain in excellent health. Cravath, Swaine & Moore, Sullivan & Cromwell and Kirkland & Ellis are still some of Wall Street’s busiest limousine-chasers. Less fortunate firms have fizzled out, rather than blown up. One shop, Donovan, Leisure, Newton & Irvine, closed in 1998. Another, Shearman & Sterling, has announced a merger with a British rival."

== Official information ==
- Stewart, James (1983). The Partners: Inside America's Most Powerful Law Firms. New York: Simon & Schuster. ISBN 0-671-42023-2.
