= Henry Sturgis Morgan =

American banker (1900–1982)

- Born: October 24, 1900; London, England
- Died: February 8, 1982 (aged 81); New York City, New York, U.S.
- Education: Groton School, Harvard University
- Occupation: Banker
- Years active: 1923–1982
- Known for: Co-founder of Morgan Stanley
- Board member of: J.P. Morgan & Co., General; Electric, Pullman Company, Harvard Board of Overseers, Groton School, MoMA
- Spouse: Catherine Adams (m. 1923–1982)
- Children: Henry Jr.; Charles; Miles; John; Peter
- Parent(s): J. P. Morgan Jr. Jane Norton Grew
- Relatives: Morgan family

Henry Sturgis Morgan Sr. (October 24, 1900 – February 8, 1982) was an American banker, known for being the co-founder of Morgan Stanley and the president and chairman of the Morgan Library & Museum.

== Early life and education ==
Morgan was born on October 24, 1900, in London, United Kingdom to John Pierpont Morgan Jr. (1867–1943) and Jane Norton Morgan (née Grew) (1868–1925). His father was the son of John Pierpont Morgan Sr. (1837–1913) and his mother was the daughter of Boston banker and mill owner Henry Sturgis Grew (1833–1910). He was educated at Groton School and graduated from Harvard University in 1923.

== Career ==
In 1923, the same year he graduated from Harvard, he joined J.P. Morgan & Co. and was a partner from 1928 to 1935. In 1935, he co-founded Morgan Stanley together with Harold Stanley when the Glass–Steagall Act forced the separation on investment banking and commercial banking.

At the death of his father in 1943, he and his brother, Junius Spencer Morgan III, inherited the estate. Morgan owned a 448-acre (1.81 km^{2}) estate, which is located at Eaton's Neck Road, Eatons Neck, New York, United States.

== Personal life ==
On June 26, 1923, he married Catherine Frances Lovering Adams (1902–1988), daughter of Frances Lovering and Charles Francis Adams III, the U.S. Secretary of the Navy under Herbert Hoover, and a descendant of U.S. Presidents John Adams and John Quincy Adams. The couple had five sons:

- Henry Sturgis Morgan Jr. (1924–2011), a Navy Rear Admiral and maritime lawyer
- Charles Francis Morgan (b. 1926), who was a Morgan Stanley executive, who married Sarah Baldwin Lambert in 1960.
- Miles Morgan (1928–2024) A Music Composer and director.
- John Adams Morgan (1930–2025), an investment banker, former Vice Chairman of Smith Barney Harris Upham & Co. and founder of the firm Morgan, Lewis, Githens and Ahn.
- Peter Angus Morgan (1938–2013).

He died on February 8, 1982, in Manhattan, New York City at Columbia-Presbyterian Medical Center.

=== Activities and interests ===
Morgan was trustee, president and chairman of the Morgan Library & Museum, served on the boards of J.P. Morgan & Co., General Electric and Pullman Company, served as trustee of the Groton School and Museum of Modern Art and member of the Harvard Board of Overseers. During World War II, Morgan was commissioned as a Lieutenant-Commander in the Naval Reserve and served as both an OSS Agent and Japanese translator.

Like his father, brother and grandfather, he was the Commodore of New York Yacht Club where he served as chairman of its America's Cup Committee. He was also vice president of the International Yacht Racing Union. He was a member of the Bohemian Club, the Council on Foreign Relations, Community Service Society of New York, the Pilgrims Society and the Roxburghe Club.

Morgan was posthumously inducted into the America's Cup Hall of Fame in 2001.
