= Den of Thieves (Stewart book) =

1992 non-fiction book by James B. Stewart

- Softcover edition
- Author: James B. Stewart
- Language: English
- Subject: Law
- Genre: Non-fiction
- Publisher: Simon & Schuster
- Publication date: 1992
- Publication place: United States
- Media type: Softcover
- Pages: 592 pp.
- ISBN: 0-671-79227-X
- Preceded by: Prosecutors

Den of Thieves is a 1992 non-fiction book by American writer James B. Stewart.

== Overview ==
Den of Thieves recounts the insider trading scandals involving Ivan Boesky, Michael Milken, and other Wall Street financiers in the United States during the 1980s, such as Robert Freeman, Terren Peizer, Dennis Levine, Lowell Milken, John A. Mulheren, Martin Siegel, and others. There have been eight editions as of 2008.

Intertwining the stories of financiers, bankers, lawyers, and the law enforcement officials who pursued them, Den of Thieves tells a true tale of arrogance and complacency amongst the Wall Street elite. As leveraged buyouts and takeovers proliferated in the heady 1980s, information on which companies were being targeted became ever more valuable. The stock price of companies could rise enormously on rumors of a potential takeover. Those who were privy to that information before it became public could make huge sums of money. Stewart shows how some of the biggest names in American financial history were involved in one of the greatest insider-trading schemes ever and how their exposure and punishment sent shock waves through corporate America.

== Official information ==
- Stewart, James (1992). Den of Thieves. New York: Simon & Schuster. ISBN 0-671-79227-X. Exclusive photographs by Robert A. Cumins included.
