= John Adams Morgan =

American sailor (1930–2025)

- Born: September 17, 1930; Oyster Bay, New York, U.S.
- Died: January 23, 2025 (aged 94)
- Education: Groton School
- Alma mater: Yale University
- Board member of: Masco; Provident Loan Society
- Spouses: Elizabeth Robbins Choate (m. 1953; div. 1957) Tania Goss (m. 1962; div. 1966) Anne Chute (m. 1989; div. 1993) Sonja Tremont (m. 1998; div. 2006) Connie Morgan (m. 2010)
- Children: 4
- Parent(s): Henry Sturgis Morgan; Catherine Lovering Adams
- Relatives: Morgan family
- Awards: Olympic Gold Medal at 1952 Olympics: 6m class

John Adams Morgan (September 17, 1930 – January 23, 2025) was an American sailor, Olympic champion and the founder of Morgan Joseph. His father, Henry Sturgis Morgan, was the co-founder of Morgan Stanley and his great-grandfather was J. P. Morgan, founder of J.P. Morgan & Co.

== Early life ==
John Adams Morgan was born on September 17, 1930, in Oyster Bay on Long Island to Henry Sturgis Morgan and Catherine Lovering Adams. His mother was the daughter of Frances Lovering and Charles Francis Adams III, the U.S. Secretary of the Navy under President Herbert Hoover, and a descendant of U.S. Presidents John Adams and his son John Quincy Adams. John attended the Groton School, graduating in 1949. He then attended Yale University, graduating with a Bachelor of Arts in 1953.

== Career ==
=== Olympic career ===
Morgan competed at the 1952 Summer Olympics in Helsinki, where he won a gold medal in the 6 metre class with the boat Llanoria.

=== Business ===
Family Capital Growth Partners

Investment ManagersFinance

Family Capital Growth Partners (FCGP) invests in companies located in the United States. The firm focuses on a broad range of sectors and industries. It participates in growth capital transactions with an investment of USD 2 - 30 million.

From 1956 to 1966, Morgan was a partner in Dominick & Dominick. From 1966 to 1982, he worked at Smith Barney, serving as a senior vice president in charge of the corporate finance department, and from 1970 as vice chairman of Smith Barney in charge of the firm's merger and acquisition activities, a member of the executive committee and a director of Smith Barney International Inc.

In 1982, Morgan, the great-grandson of J. P. Morgan, established an investment banking firm known as Morgan Lewis Githens & Ahn, Inc. In 1985, it organized a leveraged buyout with the Olin Corporation, an industrial chemical concern based in Stamford, Connecticut, of Olin's Ecusta cigarette paper business. In 1987, the firm assisted with the acquisition of Service America Corp. from Alleco Inc., formerly Allegheny Beverage Corporation, for $450 million in cash and securities.

In 2001, the firm and Morgan's broker-dealer license, was bought by the newly established MLGA Holdings. Mr Morgan, along with Fred Joseph (1937–2010), the former president and chief executive officer of the investment bank Drexel Burnham Lambert during the 1980 - to its closure , co-founded the new entity, which became known as Morgan Joseph LLC in 2002, sought to create a high-yield business for mid-size companies and take advantage of investment bankers who were laid off during the technology stock bubble of 2000. After the new firm was established, Morgan served as chairman of the board of directors of Morgan Joseph until his retirement in 2016.

In December 2010, Morgan Joseph LLC merged with Tri-Artisan Partners LLC to form Morgan Joseph TriArtisan Group, Inc. In April 2011, Apollo Global Management invested in Morgan Joseph TriArtisan, and registered as a brokerage firm to find clients and deals for its buyout and hedge funds.

=== Board of trustees ===
From 1969, Morgan served as a director of Upham & Co., Inc. From 1989 until January 1998, he was a director of TriMas Corporation until it was acquired by Metaldyne Corporation. He then served as a director of Metaldyne from 1984 until its recapitalization in November 2000. As of 2001, he was a director of Furnishings International Inc. and a trustee of the Provident Loan Society of New York. Served as a director of Raytheon Technologies and of Flight Safety.

Family Capital Growth Partners - Principal, Corporate office

Long Point Capital inc - Director of Board 1989 - retired 2016

Mr Morgan served on the board of directors for 35 years until his death in 2025 of the Morgan Library & Museum. and was serving on financial board of the Museum at the same time.

He was on the board of Directors of Masco for 30 years and retired in 2015.

He served as the founding chairman of the Board of Morgan Joseph until his retirement in 2016.

Long Point Capital, Inc.	Private Equity Investor	1989-12-31	2010-03-29
Morgan Lewis Gitchens & Ahn, Inc.	Corporate Officer/Principal	-	-
Family Capital Growth Partners	Corporate Officer/Principal		

== Personal life ==
=== Marriages and children ===
His first marriage was to Elizabeth Robbins Choate (1953–1957), the daughter of Robert Burnett Choate and the sister of Robert B. Choate Jr. They had John Adams Morgan Jr. 1954, and divorced in 1957.

His second marriage was to Tania Goss (1962-1965), an alumna of the Ethel Walker School and Vassar College who was the daughter of Natalie Holbrook and Chauncey Porter Goss (d. 1964) of Middlebury, Connecticut. In 1964 they had a son, Chauncey Goss Morgan, who had a career in management primarily of manufacturing businesses.

His third marriage was to Anne Chute (1989-1993). They had no children together.

His fourth marriage was to Sonja Tremont (1998-2006). They had one daughter together, Quincy Adams Morgan.

His fifth marriage was to Connie H. Morgan (2010-2025) to whom he was married to until his death in 2025. They share their daughter Caroline Philipson and stepdaughter Christina Philipson.

=== Residences ===
Morgan owned Caritas Island, a 3.5-acre (1.4 ha) private island compound off the coast of Stamford, Connecticut with a 26-room, 14,000-square-foot (1,300 m^{2}) home originally built in 1906. In 2011, Morgan listed the island for sale for $18.9 million.

=== Death ===
Morgan died on January 23, 2025, at the age of 94.
