= Joseph Jett =

American former securities trader (born 1958)

Orlando Joseph Jett
- Born: 1958 (age 67–68)
- Education: MIT, Harvard Business School
- Occupation: Securities trader
- Known for: Kidder, Peabody & Co.

Orlando Joseph Jett (born 1958) is an American former securities trader, known for his role in the Kidder Peabody trading loss in 1994. At the time of the loss it was the largest trading fraud in history.

== Jett's background ==
Joseph Jett grew up near Cleveland, Ohio. He earned his bachelor's and master's degrees in chemical engineering at MIT and after working two years at GE Plastics went on to earn an MBA from Harvard Business School. Jett was hired by Kidder, Peabody & Co in July 1991. At the time he was 33 years old. He had worked previously as a bond trader at Morgan Stanley for two years and at First Boston for eighteen months.

== Kidder Peabody ==
At the time of Jett's employment, Kidder, Peabody & Co. was owned by General Electric Corporation, who had purchased the firm in 1986. In 1994, after numerous losses including those related to Jett, the firm was hurriedly sold to Paine Webber. After the acquisition, the Kidder Peabody name was dropped.

== Jett’s trading strategy ==
Jett's primary strategy was to exploit a flaw in Kidder's computer systems that made unprofitable trades appear profitable.

"There were virtually no genuine profitable trades. Joseph Jett, Kidder, Peabody's former bond-trading star, simply made up trades and marked them down as having made money. In the meantime, his few real trades consistently lost money."

- Floyd Norris in the New York Times

The trades used in constructing the phony profits were forward reconstitutions of US Treasury bonds. The transaction is executed when a trader buys a set of Treasury STRIPS sufficient to re-create the original bond from which they were derived.

Kidder's system incorrectly valued forward-dated transactions as if they were immediately settled, rather than taking into account the time value of money for the period before settlement of the trade. The method Jett followed was facilitated by this error. By buying US Treasury bond STRIPS (whose price increases each day due to accretion), hedged by a short Treasury bond position (whose price remains relatively stable over the settlement period), Jett was able to book immediate, illusory profits. Once settlement of the trade happened, any false profits immediately were reversed as a loss. Therefore, in order to continue to appear profitable, Jett had to engage in more and more such trades, enough to both offset the losses on the settling trades plus additional trades to keep delivering profits. For the scheme to persist, the size had to continually grow, and this is what eventually brought the scheme's downfall—Jett's trading size had become so large that General Electric, the owner of Kidder Peabody at the time, asked that he cut the size of his positions because of the bloating of GE's balance sheet. With no new trades to offset those settling and rolling off, the losses became apparent to Kidder senior management.

Jett, who was previously a marginally profitable trader, started earning large bonuses once he began executing the trades that exploited the system flaw. While in 1991, Jett was paid a bonus of $5000, in 1992 and 1993 he was paid $2.1 million and $9.3 million respectively. The board of General Electric, who had owned Kidder Peabody since 1986, had to approve the outsized $9.3 million bonus in 1993.

In the first quarter of 1994, Jett was "trading" so frequently that Kidder's computer systems couldn't keep up, and his "profits" had grown to $350 million, large enough that Kidder management feared he was taking unacceptable risks. Computer specialists began noticing that none of Jett's supposed "trades" were ever consummated. It eventually emerged that Jett rolled trades over two to three days before he was due to settle up, but kept the profits on the books. Kidder halted Jett's trading and summoned Jett to a meeting. When his explanations proved unsatisfactory, he was fired. The losses were large enough that parent GE had to take a $210 million charge to its first-quarter earnings.

Later, in his autobiography Straight from the Gut, longtime GE chairman Jack Welch would lament not following his normal practice of personally looking into how one of his employees could become so successful so quickly. He also recalled GE business leaders were so shaken by the size of the loss that they were willing to dip into the coffers of their own divisions to close the gap. In contrast, Welch said, no one at Kidder was willing to take responsibility for the debacle; most Kidder staffers were concerned about the effect on their bonuses. This convinced Welch that Kidder's culture did not fit with that of GE, and led him to sell off Kidder later that year.

== The Lynch Report ==
As the scandal first came to light, Kidder Peabody hired lawyer Gary G. Lynch from the law firm of Davis, Polk & Wardwell, the former enforcement chief of the Securities and Exchange Commission, to conduct an internal investigation. The result was an 86-page document that became known as the Lynch Report. The report was released in August 1994 and concluded that Jett acted alone, but also blamed the losses on a complete breakdown of the system of supervision at Kidder, particularly with regard to Ed Cerullo and Melvin Mullin.

"Jett was provided the opportunity to generate false profits by trading and accounting systems," Mr. Lynch wrote. "It was his supervisors, however, who allowed Jett that opportunity for over two years because they never understood Jett's daily trading activity or the source of his apparent profitability. Instead, their focus was on profit and loss and risk-management data that provided no insight into the mechanics of Jett's trading."

The use of Gary Lynch to conduct the internal investigation was controversial, as Lynch was also the lawyer hired by Kidder Peabody to represent the firm in its case against Jett.

== Regulatory organization charges and decisions ==
The Securities and Exchange Commission (SEC) the National Association of Securities Dealers (NASD), and the New York Stock Exchange (NYSE) were all involved in the various actions concerning the Jett case, as they all had some regulatory authority over Kidder Peabody.

The NSYE acted first, barring Jett from trading securities or working for any employer affiliated with the exchange, effectively blacklisting Jett from the securities industry.

The NASD was involved in the dispute over Jett's bonuses, which were frozen in an account held by Kidder Peabody. In 1996, an NASD arbitration panel rejected Kidder Peabody's monetary claims against Jett and ordered the funds from Jett's personal accounts to be released. Kidder had sought $8.2 million for undeserved bonuses and $74.6 million for trading losses incurred by Kidder (the latter of which was the amount of the actual losses, rather than the total false gains of $350 million). Although the bonuses from Jett's trading had totaled $11.4 million, the accounts only contained approximately $5 million due to deduction of deferred compensation (which, the panel ruled, did not have to be paid to Jett) and taxes due. In a 1999 Salon.com interview, Jett said that ultimately $4.5 million was returned to him in 1998.

The Securities and Exchange Commission investigated the losses from 1994 onward, and in 1998 released an initial ruling that Jett did not commit securities fraud, but charged him with a lesser record-keeping violation.

"This Initial Decision finds that, for over two years, Mr. Jett exploited an anomaly in Kidder’s software, in the manner of a pyramid scheme, that credited him on Kidder’s books with enormous, but illusory, profits. He did this with intent to defraud."

The SEC ordered Jett to forfeit his $8.2 million in bonuses associated with the false profits, fined him $200,000, and barred him from any future association with a securities broker or dealer.

Both Jett and the SEC's Enforcement Division appealed the decision. In March 2004 the SEC finally ruled on the appeal, and concluded that, in addition to upholding the record-keeping violation, Jett had also committed securities fraud. Specifically, they found that Jett committed fraud by deliberately exploiting weaknesses in Kidder Peabody's automated trading records system in order to book fake profits of about $264 million (when he had actually lost the firm about $75 million). The Commission re-affirmed the penalty that Jett forfeit $8.2 million in fraudulently-obtained bonuses, plus the fine of $200,000 and a lifetime ban from the securities industry. However, the NYSE's decision to ban him from any company affiliated with the exchange had effectively ended his career in the industry even before the SEC's action.

Jett never appealed the 2004 SEC decision, even though he had the right to do so. In 2006, when the SEC was seeking an enforcement action against Jett in the United States District Court for the 2004 decision, Jett sent a memorandum to the court saying that he had never received notice from the SEC as to their 2004 decision since the order had been sent to his old address. He sent another filing saying he was unaware of the 2004 decision being made and therefore had no chance to appeal. The District Court rejected this when they found that Jett had been quoted in a New York Times article shortly after the 2004 decision was announced, saying that he was unconcerned with the SEC action since he was still legal to trade securities offshore.

The SEC released an enforcement action against Jett in 2007, ordering him to pay the fines due.

The US Attorney's office investigated Jett, but no criminal charges were ever filed.

== Jett's post-Kidder career ==
Jett has written two books about his life and experience at Kidder Peabody.

Jett has claimed to operate a hedge fund called Cambridge Matrix Funds, domiciled in the British Virgin Islands. However, the BVI Financial Services Commission, the regulator of such funds, has no listing for Cambridge Matrix in its comprehensive list of funds domiciled in the BVI.

Jett told The New York Times in 2004 that he gets between $4,000 and $8,000 per appearance on the lecture circuit.

He currently operates a firm called Jett Capital Management LLC. According to its website, the firm offers asset management, advisory, and private equity services, though it is unclear how Jett is able to perform these functions while being permanently barred from the securities industry.

In July 2008, the French news channel France 24 televised a feature following the Jérôme Kerviel trading losses, which featured an extensive interview with Jett. In it, Jett said that because of legal costs he has no money left to pay the SEC fines, and that he was living in the basement of an ex-girlfriend's house in Princeton, New Jersey. The France24 reporter said that Jett is running a financial consultancy domiciled offshore, which conducts its business from hired conference suites in New Jersey. The show televised Jett meeting with a client who was trying to raise $9 million for a business venture. At the conclusion of the report, the commentator said she believed that Jett was trying to use the France 24 program to show the SEC that he has no money to pay the fines due.
