= Federal Prison Camp, Pensacola =

Federal prison in Florida, United States

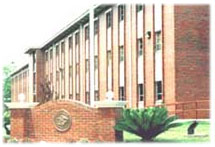
- Interactive map of Federal Prison Camp, Pensacola
- Location: 110 Raby Avenue, Pensacola postal address, Escambia County, Florida; 30.4634°N 87.3432°W
- Status: Closed
- Security class: Minimum-security
- Population: 0 (June 2026)
- Managed by: W.L Woods, Warden Federal Bureau of Prisons

The Federal Prison Camp, Pensacola (FPC Pensacola) was a minimum-security United States federal prison for male inmates in unincorporated Escambia County, Florida, near Pensacola. It is operated by the Federal Bureau of Prisons, a division of the United States Department of Justice.

FPC Pensacola is located on Saufley Field, an outlying field of Naval Air Station Pensacola, 175 miles west of the state capital of Tallahassee and 50 miles east of Mobile, Alabama.

== History ==
Operations began in 1988 when the Bureau of Prisons negotiated a partnership with the United States Navy to lease land and several excess buildings at Saufley Field in exchange for inmate labor. In 2006, the Bureau of Prisons decided to cut costs by closing the Federal Prison Camp, Eglin, which was located at Eglin Air Force Base, in Okaloosa County, and moving the inmates to FPC Pensacola. In July 2009, Forbes magazine listed the prison as the number two "cushiest prison" in the United States. In October 2006 the United States Department of Justice indicted four people for bribery and providing contraband to inmates at the prison. In March 2007, the prison made headlines when an inmate escaped from a work detail at Naval Air Station Pensacola.

In December 2024, it was learned that the facility will be closed at a later date, with approximately 500 inmates and 100 staff members being relocated to other facilities. The buildings, which are in “significant disrepair”, will be demolished after the closure. By 2026, the prison was closed.

== Notable inmates (current and former) ==
Inmate Name	Register Number	Photo	Status	Details
Tim Donaghy	75377-053		Released from custody in 2009; served 11 months.	Former NBA referee; pleaded guilty in 2007 to wire fraud conspiracy and illegally transmitting betting information for accepting thousands of dollars from professional gambler James Batista in exchange for providing inside information on games.
Chris Collins	86014-054		Formerly incarcerated; pardoned by President Trump on 22 December 2020.	U.S. Representative from New York's 27th district. Convicted of insider trading.
Billy Walters	25880-048		Formerly incarcerated; sentence commuted on January 20, 2021, by President Trump.	Professional sports gambler convicted of insider trading related to Dean Foods Co. Walters was convicted of leveraging insider information, that was provided to him by former Dean Foods Co. Chairman Tom Davis, into millions of dollars in profits. Professional golfer Phil Mickelson was also named in the investigation.
Irvin Mayfield	37328–034		Released in January 2023.	Jazz trumpeter guilty of the New Orleans Library scandal.
Robert M. Freeman	13691–054		Released from custody in 1990; served 4 months.	Goldman Sachs partner; convicted of insider trading.
Douglas Green	20952-077		Released from custody in 2003; served 12 years.	Louisiana insurance commissioner from 1988 to 1991; convicted in 1991 of conspiracy, mail fraud and money laundering for using his position to prop up a failing insurance company in exchange for $2.7 million in bribes.
Paul H. Jones	55193-060		Released from federal custody in 2008 and transferred to an Ohio state prison.	Mayor of Ravenna, Ohio, from 1976 to 1982 and 1996 to 2005; convicted in 2010 of mail fraud and filing false tax returns for using his position to assist his son's business make over $260,000 in profits and failing to report those profits to the IRS.
Scott Maddox	26266–017		Moved to FCI Talladega, released on 9 May 2023.	Former Tallahassee City Commissioner sentenced to 5 years for bribery.
Robert Powell	15110-067		Released from custody in 2013; served 18 months.	Developer of two for-profit juvenile prisons in Pennsylvania; pleaded guilty to paying $770,000 to two judges in exchange for sentencing juveniles to serve time in those prisons; known as the Kids for Cash scandal.
Mike Berlon	66280-019		Released from custody in 2020; served 5 years and 3 months.	Lawyer, politician and long time political strategist. Former chairman of the Georgia State Democratic Party and member of the Democratic National Committee's executive committee. Berlon pleaded guilty to one count of wire fraud involving misuse of funds from his law firm in 2015.
Mark Whitacre	07543-424		Released from custody in 2007; served 8 years.	FBI informant who assisted in the ADM price-fixing investigation; pleaded guilty in 1997 to embezzling $9 million from the company; Whitacre was the subject of the 2009 Steven Soderbergh film The Informant!.
Luis Arroyo			Released from custody in May 2026; served 57-month sentence	Former member of the Illinois House of Representatives. On November 3, 2021, Arroyo pled guilty in Illinois to the federal wire fraud charge related to involvement in a bribery scheme and was sentenced in May 2022 to 57 months in prison. This prison sentence for Arroyo would be upheld in July 2023, with Arroyo confirmed to be serving his sentence at the Pensacola-based minimum security prison. He would be released in May 2026.
Todd Chrisley	72600-019		Reported for 12-year sentence on January 17, 2023. Scheduled release date (03/18/2033). Pardoned May 27, 2025.	Todd and wife Julie Chrisley were sentenced to prison in November 2022 for fraud and tax crimes. They were pardoned on May 27, 2025, by President Donald Trump.
William Rick Singer	01452-138		Released from custody in March 2025; reported for 3-year and 6-month sentence on February 27, 2023.	Pled guilty to four felony counts of conspiracy to commit money laundering, conspiracy to defraud the United States, and obstruction of justice as the mastermind of the Varsity Blues scandal. Transferred from prison to halfway house in 2024, before being released from the prison's custody in March 2025.
Tim Mapes			Reported for 30-month prison sentence on June 12, 2024	Former chief of staff to former Illinois Speaker of the House Michael Madigan. Mapes was convicted in convicted in August 2023 of both one count of making false declarations before a grand jury and one count of attempted obstruction of justice in a perjury case which involved some alleged protection of Madigan by Mapes. Maples was deemed to have lied under oath in order to protect Madigan from an investigation concerning an alleged ComEd bribery scheme. In February 2024, Mapes was sentenced to 30 months in prison. Mapes reported to the federal prison in Pensacola on June 12, 2024. Under federal rules, Mapes must serve at least 85% of his sentence, with a good behavior release being optional by July 2026.

== See also ==
- List of U.S. federal prisons
- Federal Bureau of Prisons
- Incarceration in the United States
