= Henry P. Kidder =

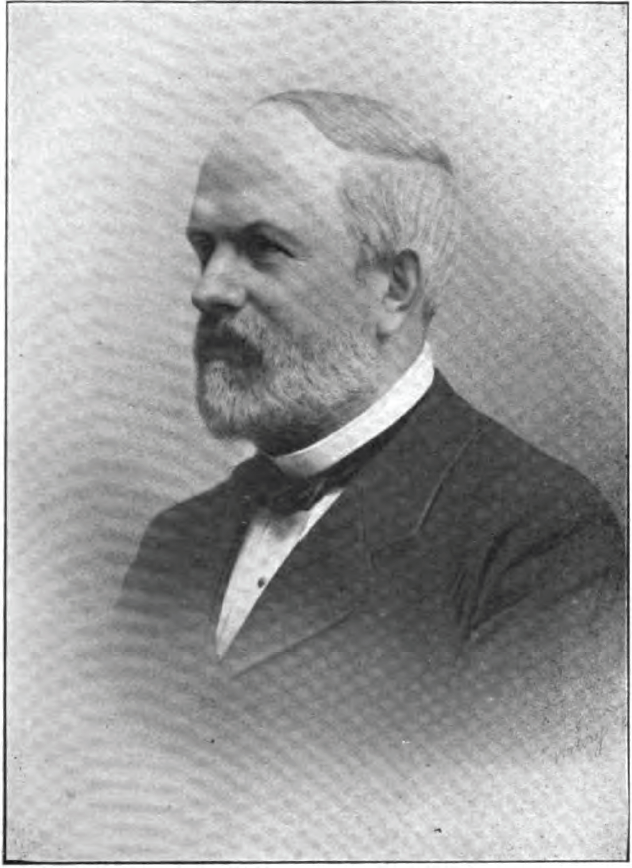
Henry P. Kidder

Henry Purkitt Kidder (January 18, 1823 – January 28, 1886) was an American bank founder born in Cambridge, Massachusetts.

== Early life ==
Kidder was born on January 18, 1823, in Cambridge, Massachusetts. His parents were Thomas Kidder, a Boston civil servant in charge of meat and fish inspection, and the former Clarissa Purkitt.

Kidder was educated at Boston English High School.

== Career ==
In 1838, he became a clerk in a grocery store, and at age 18, became a clerk in the office of Coolidge & Haskell. In 1847, Kidder joined J.E. Thayer & Brother, where he learned banking.

In April 1865, Kidder, Francis H. Peabody, and Oliver W. Peabody, all of whom had previously worked as clerks at J.E. Thayer & Brother, established Kidder, Peabody & Co., via reorganization of J.E. Thayer & Brother. In 1886, Kidder, Peabody became the agents of the London bank, Baring Brothers.

== Personal life ==
Kidder served on several charitable boards.

Kidder died on January 28, 1886, in New York City.
