= Drexel Burnham Lambert =

American investment bank

Coordinates: 40.70536°N 74.01198°W

Drexel Burnham Lambert Inc.

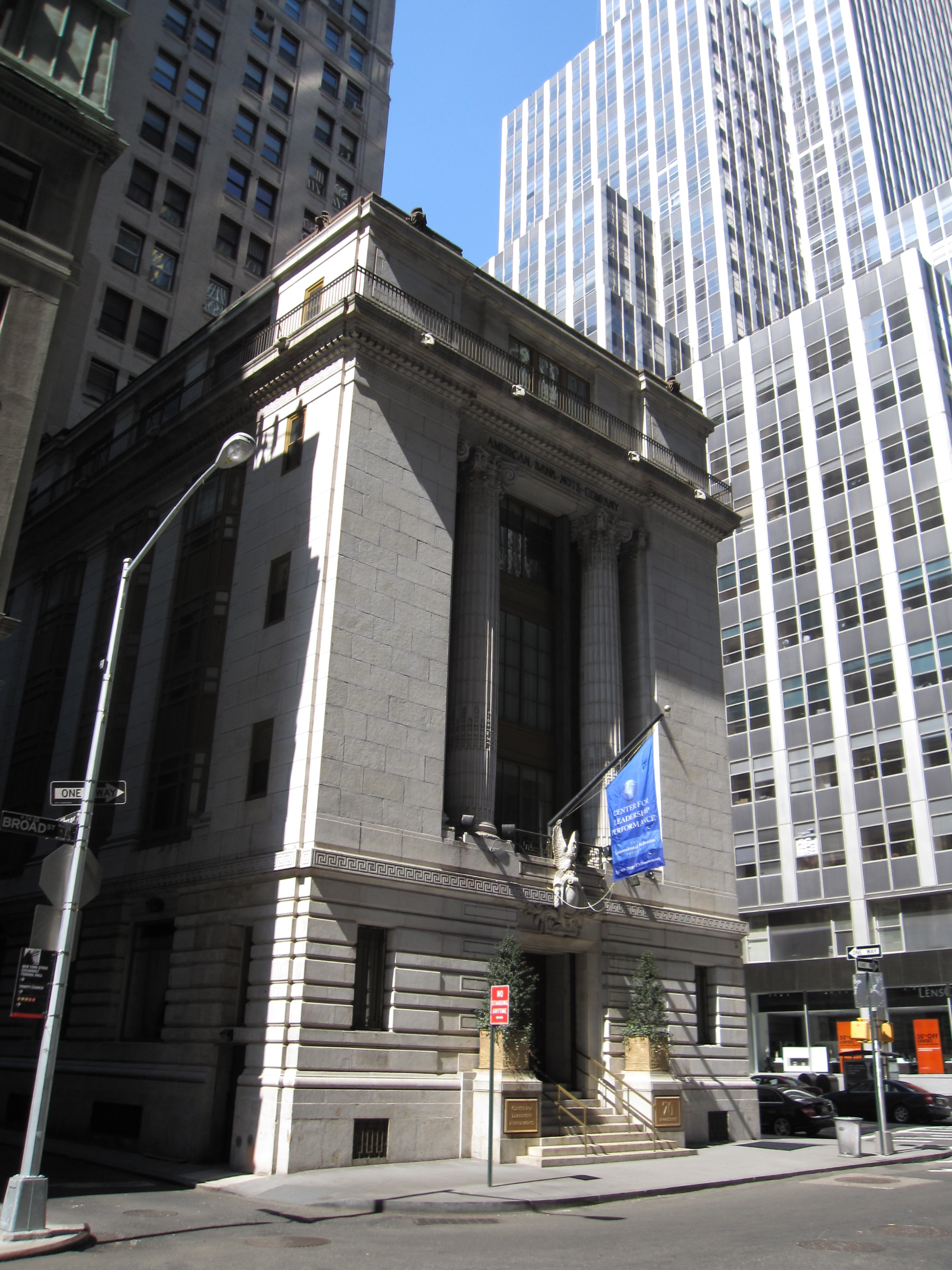
- The Drexel headquarters (right) on Wall Street in New York City
- Type: Private
- Traded as: NYSE: DBL; DJIA component; S&P 100 component; S&P 500 component
- Industry: Financial services
- Founded: 1935 (with heritage dating to 1838)
- Founder: I. W. "Tubby" Burnham
- Defunct: 1994
- Fate: Forced into bankruptcy
- Headquarters: 60 Broad Street, New York City, US
- Key people: Fred Joseph (president and CEO); Michael Milken (head of high-yield securities)
- Products: Investment banking Investment management
- Revenue: ▲US$4.8 billion (1986)
- Net income: ▲US$545.5 million (1986)
- Total assets: ▲US$35.9 billion (1986)
- Number of employees: ▲10,000 (1986)

Drexel Burnham Lambert Inc. was an American multinational investment bank that was forced into bankruptcy in 1990 due to its involvement in illegal activities in the junk bond market, driven by senior executive Michael Milken. At its height, it was a Bulge Bracket bank, as the fifth-largest investment bank in the United States.

The firm had its most profitable fiscal year in 1986, netting $545.5 million, which represented the most profitable year ever for a Wall Street firm at the time, equivalent to $1.36 billion in 2025. Milken, who was Drexel's head of high-yield securities, was paid $295 million, the highest salary that an employee in the modern history of the world had ever received. Even so, Milken deemed his salary to be insufficient for his contributions to the bank, and received $550 million the next fiscal year.

Drexel steered numerous large corporate takeovers during the 1980s. However, Drexel's excessive ambition caused the firm to veer into criminal behavior. Eventually, it abused the junk bond market and became involved in insider trading. In February 1990, Drexel filed for Chapter 11 bankruptcy to avoid being seized by the Securities and Exchange Commission. It was the first Wall Street firm to be forced into bankruptcy since the Great Depression.

== Early history ==
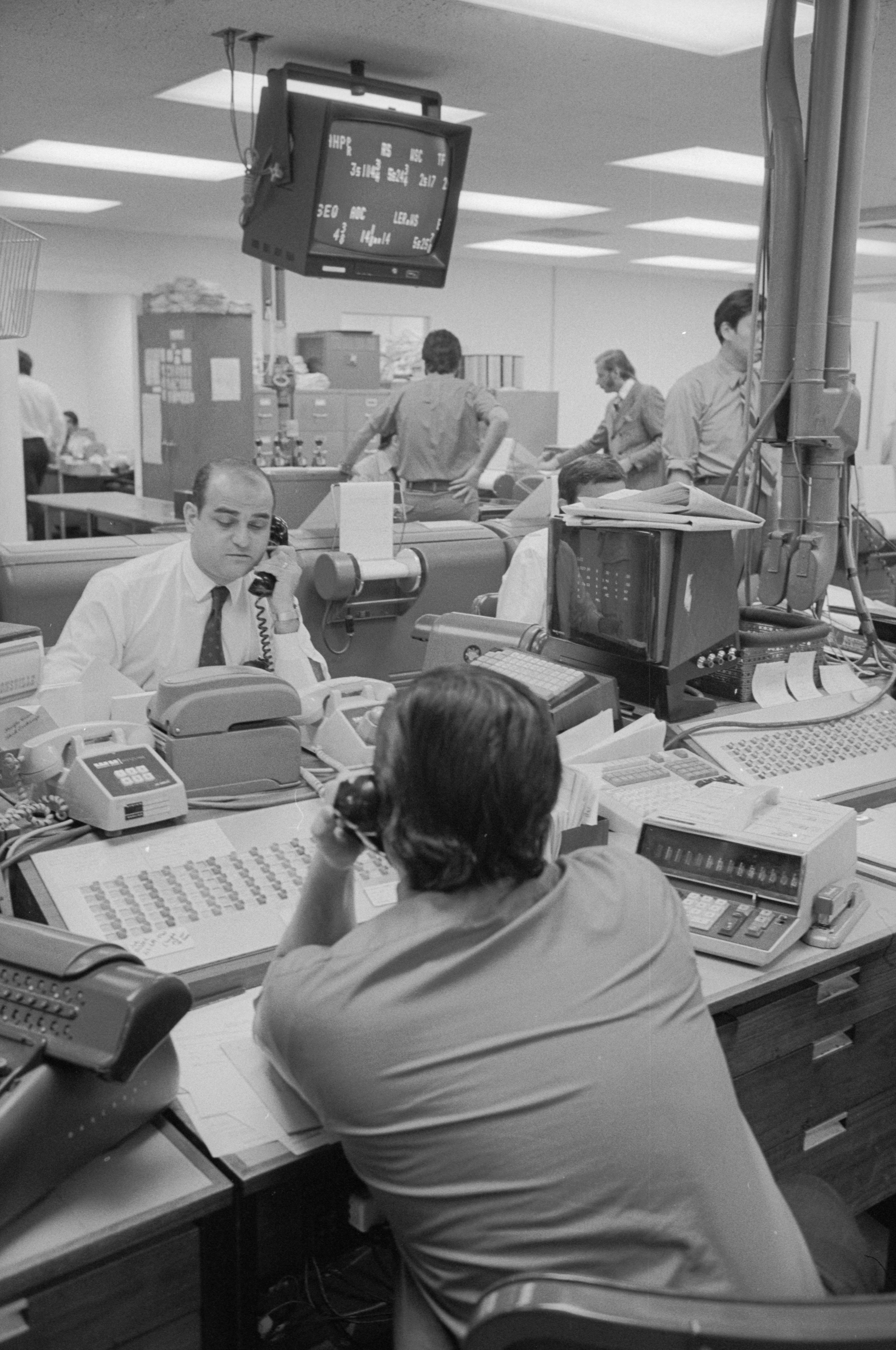
Burnham & Co. office in 1971

I.W. "Tubby" Burnham, a 1931 graduate of the Wharton School of the University of Pennsylvania, founded the firm in 1935 as Burnham and Company, a small New York City-based retail brokerage. Burnham started the firm with $100,000 of capital (equivalent to $1.8 million in 2025), $96,000 of which was borrowed from his grandfather Isaac Wolfe Bernheim, the founder of a Kentucky distillery.

It became one of the more successful brokerages in the country, eventually building its capital to $1 billion. While Burnham eventually branched out into investment banking, the company's ability to expand was limited by the structure of the investment banking industry of that time. A strict set of unwritten rules assured the dominance of a few large firms by controlling the order in which their names appeared in advertisements for an underwriting. Burnham, as a "sub-major" firm, needed to connect with a "major" or "special" firm in order to further expand.

Burnham found a willing partner in Drexel Firestone, an ailing Philadelphia-based firm with a rich history. Drexel Firestone traced its history to 1838, when Francis Martin Drexel founded Drexel & Company. His brother, Anthony Joseph Drexel, became a partner in the firm at age 21, in 1847. The company made money in the opportunities created by mid-century gold finds in California. The company was also involved in financial deals with the federal government during the Mexican–American War and the U.S. Civil War. A. J. Drexel took over the firm when his brother died in 1863. He partnered with J. P. Morgan and created one of the largest banking companies in the world, Drexel, Morgan & Co.

In 1940, several former Drexel partners and associates formed an investment bank and assumed the rights to the "Drexel and Company" name. The old Drexel, which chose to concentrate on commercial banking after the Glass–Steagall Act regulated the separation of commercial and investment banking, was completely absorbed into the Morgan empire. The new Drexel grew slowly, relying on its predecessor's historic ties to the larger securities issuers. By the early 1960s, it found itself short on capital. It merged with Harriman, Ripley and Company in 1965 to form Drexel Harriman Ripley. In the mid-1970s, it sold a 25 percent stake to Firestone Tire and Rubber Company, renaming itself Drexel Firestone.

Despite having only two major clients by the 1970s, Drexel was still considered a major firm, and thus got a large chunk of the syndicates formed to sell stocks and bonds. By 1973, however, it was a shell of its former self, and the shock of the 1973-1974 market crash sent the firm reeling. Drexel management soon realized that a prominent name was not nearly enough to survive and was very receptive to a merger offer from Burnham.

Even though Burnham was by far the dominant partner and nominal survivor in the merger, the more powerful investment banks insisted that the Drexel name come first as a condition of inheriting the old Drexel's place in the "major" bracket. Burnham had no choice but to agree, since his enlarged firm needed the informal blessing of the more powerful firms to survive on Wall Street. Thus, Drexel Burnham and Company, headquartered in New York, was born in 1973 with $44 million in capital. The merged firm claimed 1935 as its founding date.

In 1976, it merged with William D. Witter (also known as Lambert Brussels Witter), a small "research boutique" that was the American arm of Belgian-based Groupe Bruxelles Lambert. The firm was renamed Drexel Burnham Lambert and incorporated that year after 41 years as a limited partnership. The enlarged firm was privately held; Lambert held a 26 percent stake and received six seats on the board of directors. Most of the remaining 74 percent was held by employees. Burnham remained the enlarged firm's chairman. He handed his posts of president and CEO to Robert Linton, who had started at Burnham and Company in 1945 as a stock certificate runner. Linton succeeded Burnham as chairman in 1982.

== Business ==
Drexel's legacy as an advisor to both startup companies and fallen angels remains an industry model today. Michael Milken, one of the few senior executives who was a holdover from the old Drexel, got most of the credit by almost single-handedly creating a junk bond market. However, another key architect in this strategy was Fred Joseph. Shortly after buying the old Drexel, Burnham found out that Joseph, chief operating officer of Shearson Hamill, wanted to get back into the nuts and bolts of investment banking and hired him as co-head of corporate finance. Joseph, the son of a Boston taxicab driver, promised Burnham that in 10 years, he would make Drexel Burnham as powerful as Goldman Sachs.

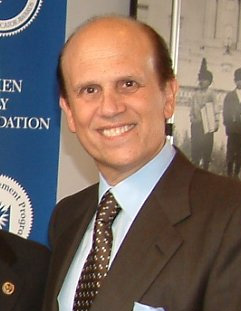
Michael Milken in 2006. A holdover from the old Drexel, he became the merged firm's head of high-yield securities

Joseph's prophecy proved accurate. The firm rose from the bottom of the pack to compete with and even top the Wall Street Bulge Bracket firms. While Milken was clearly the most powerful man in the firm (to the point that a business consultant warned Drexel that it was a "one-product company"), it was Joseph who succeeded Linton as president in 1984, adding the post of CEO in 1985.

Drexel, however, was more aggressive in its business practices than most. When it entered the mergers and acquisitions field in the early 1980s, it did not shy away from backing hostile takeovers—long a taboo among the established firms. Its specialty was the "highly confident letter", in which it promised it could get the necessary financing for a hostile takeover. Although it had no legal status, by this time Drexel (i.e., Milken) had a reputation for making markets for any bonds it underwrote. This made a Drexel "highly confident letter" as good as cash to many of the corporate raiders of the 1980s. Among the deals it financed during this time were T. Boone Pickens' failed runs at Gulf Oil and Unocal, Carl Icahn's bid for Phillips 66, Ted Turner's buyout of MGM/UA, and Kohlberg Kravis Roberts successful bid for RJR Nabisco.

Organizationally, the firm was considered the definition of a meritocracy. Divisions received bonuses based on their individual performance rather than the performance of the firm as a whole. This often led to acrimony between individual departments, who sometimes acted like independent companies rather than small parts of a larger one. Also, several employees formed limited partnerships that allowed them to invest alongside Milken. These partnerships often made more money than the firm itself did on a particular deal. For instance, many of the partnerships ended up with more warrants than the firm itself held in particular deals.

The firm had its most profitable fiscal year in 1986, netting $545.5 million—at the time, the most profitable year ever for a Wall Street firm, and equivalent to $1.36 billion in 2025. In 1987, Milken was paid executive compensation of $550 million for the year.

== Downfall ==
=== 1986–1989 ===
According to Dan Stone, a former Drexel executive, the firm's aggressive culture led many Drexel employees to stray into unethical, and sometimes illegal, conduct. Milken himself viewed the securities laws, rules and regulations with some degree of contempt, feeling they hindered the free flow of trade. He was under nearly constant scrutiny from the Securities and Exchange Commission from 1979 onward, in part because he often condoned unethical and illegal behavior by his colleagues at Drexel's operation in Beverly Hills. He personally called Joseph, however, who believed in following the rules to the letter, on several occasions with ethical questions.

The firm was first rocked on May 12, 1986, when Dennis Levine, a managing director in Drexel's M&A department, was charged with insider trading. Levine had joined Drexel only a year earlier. Unknown to Drexel management, he had spent his entire Wall Street career trading on inside information. Levine pleaded guilty to four felonies, and implicated one of his recent partners, super-arbitrageur Ivan Boesky. Largely based on information Boesky promised to provide about his dealings with Milken, the SEC initiated an investigation of Drexel on November 17. Two days later, Rudy Giuliani, then the United States Attorney for the Southern District of New York, launched his own investigation. Ominously, Milken refused to cooperate with Drexel's own internal investigation, only speaking through his attorneys. A year later, Martin Siegel, the co-head of M&A, pleaded guilty to sharing inside information with Boesky during his tenure at Kidder, Peabody.

For two years, Drexel steadfastly denied any wrongdoing, claiming that the criminal and SEC investigations into Milken's activities were based almost entirely on the statements of Boesky, an admitted felon looking to reduce his sentence. This was not enough to keep the SEC from suing Drexel in September 1988 for insider trading, stock manipulation, defrauding its clients and stock parking (buying stocks for the benefit of another). All of the transactions involved Milken and his department. The most intriguing charge was that Boesky paid Drexel $5.3 million in 1986 for Milken's share of profits from illegal trading. Earlier in the year, Boesky characterized the payment as a consulting fee to Drexel. Around the same year, Giuliani began seriously considering indicting Drexel under the powerful Racketeer Influenced and Corrupt Organizations (RICO) Act. Drexel was potentially liable under the doctrine of respondeat superior, which holds that companies are responsible for an employee's crimes.

The threat of a RICO indictment unnerved many at Drexel. A RICO indictment would have required the firm to put up a performance bond of as much as $1 billion in lieu of having its assets frozen. This provision was put in the law because organized crime had a habit of absconding with the funds of indicted companies, and the writers of RICO wanted to make sure there was something to seize or forfeit in the event of a guilty verdict. Most Wall Street firms, then as now, relied heavily on loans. However, 96 percent of Drexel's capital was borrowed money, by far the most of any firm. This debt would have to take second place to any performance bond. Additionally, if the bond ever had to be paid, Drexel's stockholders would have been all but wiped out. Due to this, banks will not extend credit to a securities firm under a RICO indictment.

By this time, several Drexel executives—including Joseph—concluded that Drexel could not survive a RICO indictment and would have to seek a settlement with Giuliani. Senior Drexel executives became particularly nervous after Princeton Newport Partners, a small investment partnership, was forced to close its doors in the summer of 1988. Princeton Newport had been indicted under RICO, and the prospect of having to post a huge performance bond forced its shutdown well before the trial. Indeed, the discovery of Milken's role in many of Princeton Newport's illicit doings led Joseph to conclude that Milken had indeed engaged in illegal activity. Joseph said years later that he'd been told that a RICO indictment would destroy Drexel within a month, if not sooner. As it turned out, even though Milken and Drexel signed a co-counsel agreement, Milken's legal team warned him that Drexel would almost certainly be forced to cooperate rather than risk being driven out of business by the pressures of the investigation.

Nonetheless, negotiations for a possible plea agreement collapsed on December 19 when Giuliani made several demands that were far too draconian even for those who advocated a settlement. Giuliani demanded that Drexel waive its attorney–client privilege, and also wanted the right to arbitrarily decide that the firm had violated the terms of any plea agreement. He also demanded that Milken leave the firm if the government ever indicted him. Drexel's board unanimously rejected the terms. For a time, it looked like Drexel was going to fight.

Only two days later, however, Drexel lawyers found out about a limited partnership set up by Milken's department, MacPherson Partners, they previously hadn't known about. This partnership had been involved in the issuing of bonds for Storer Broadcasting. Several equity warrants were sold to one client who sold them back to Milken's department. Milken then sold the warrants to MacPherson Partners. The limited partners included several of Milken's children, and more ominously, managers of money funds. This partnership raised the specter of self-dealing, and at worst, bribes to the money managers. At the very least, this was a serious breach of Drexel's internal regulations. Drexel immediately reported this partnership to Giuliani, and its revelation seriously hurt Milken's credibility with many at Drexel who believed in Milken's innocence—including Joseph and most of the board.

With literally minutes to go before being indicted (according to at least one source, the grand jury was actually in the process of voting on the indictment), Drexel reached an agreement with the government in which it entered an Alford plea to six felonies—three counts of stock parking and three counts of stock manipulation. It also agreed to pay a fine of $650 million—at the time, the largest fine ever levied under the Great Depression-era securities laws.

The government had dropped several of the demands that had initially angered Drexel but continued to insist that Milken leave the firm if indicted—which he did shortly after his own indictment in March 1989. Drexel's Alford plea allowed the firm to maintain its innocence while acknowledging that it was "not in a position to dispute the allegations" made by the government. Nonetheless, Drexel was now a convicted felon.

In April 1989, Drexel settled with the SEC, agreeing to stricter safeguards on its oversight procedures. Later that month, the firm eliminated 5,000 jobs by shuttering three departments—including the retail brokerage operation. In essence, Drexel was jettisoning the core of the old Burnham & Company. The retail accounts were eventually sold to Smith Barney.

=== 1989–1990 ===
Due to several deals that did not work out, as well as an unexpected crash of the junk bond market, 1989 was a difficult year for Drexel even after it settled the criminal and SEC cases. Reports of an $86 million loss going into the fourth quarter resulted in the firm's commercial paper rating being cut in late November. This made it nearly impossible for Drexel to reborrow its outstanding commercial paper, and it had to be repaid. Rumors abounded that the banks could yank Drexel's lines of credit at any time. Drexel had no corporate parent that could pump in cash in the event of such a crisis, unlike most American financial institutions. Groupe Bruxelles Lambert refused even to consider making an equity investment until Joseph improved the bottom line. The firm posted a $40 million loss for 1989—the first operating loss in its 54-year history.

Drexel managed to survive into 1990 by transferring some of the excess capital from its regulated broker/dealer subsidiary into its holding company, Drexel Burnham Lambert Group—only to be ordered to stop by the SEC on February 9 out of concerns about the broker's solvency. This sent Joseph and other senior executives into a near-panic. After the SEC, the New York Stock Exchange, and the Federal Reserve Bank of New York cast doubts about a restructuring plan, Joseph concluded that Drexel could not stay independent. Unfortunately, concerns about possible liability to civil suits derailed an eleventh-hour attempt to find a prospective buyer.

By February 12, it was obvious Drexel was headed for collapse. Its commercial paper rating was further reduced that day, and the holding company defaulted on $100 million in loans. Citibank led a group of banks that tried to put together a loan package for the reeling firm, but this came to nothing. With other firms shutting Drexel out of deals, Joseph's last resort was a bailout by the government. Unfortunately for Drexel, one of Drexel's first hostile deals came back to haunt it at this point. At the time of Pickens' raid on Unocal, the company's investment bank was the establishment firm Dillon, Read. Dillon, Read's former chairman, Nicholas F. Brady, was now Secretary of the Treasury. Brady had never forgiven Drexel for its role in the Unocal deal and would not even consider signing off on a bailout.

Early on the morning of February 13, New York Fed president E. Gerald Corrigan and SEC chairman Richard Breeden called Joseph and told him that they, Brady and NYSE chairman John J. Phelan Jr. saw "no light at the end of the tunnel" for Drexel. They gave Joseph an ultimatum–unless Drexel filed for bankruptcy, the SEC would seize Drexel that morning before the markets opened. After Joseph told the board that Drexel had effectively been told to "go out of business", the board voted to file for bankruptcy. That night, Drexel officially filed for Chapter 11 bankruptcy protection. Drexel was the first Wall Street firm since the Depression to be forced into bankruptcy. The filing covered only the parent company, not the broker/dealer; executives and lawyers believed that confidence in Drexel had deteriorated so much that the firm was finished in its then-current form.

Even before the firm's bankruptcy, Tubby Burnham spun off the firm's funds management arm as Burnham Financial Group, which currently operates as a diversified investment company. Burnham was reportedly still arranging deals until his death in 2002 at age 93. The rest of Drexel emerged from bankruptcy in 1992 as New Street Capital, a small investment bank with only 20 employees (at its height, Drexel employed over 10,000 people) and strict limits on its activities. In 1994, New Street merged with Green Capital, a merchant bank owned by Atlanta financier Holcombe Green.

Richard A. Brenner, the brother of a president with controlling stakes stated in his memoir My Life Seen Through Our Eyes that other firms at Wall Street did not support Drexel or come to its aid when the company got into trouble because they were "smelling an opportunity to grab this business".

== Criticism ==
By the late 1980s, public confidence in leveraged buyouts had waned, and criticism of the perceived engine of the takeover movement, the junk bond, had increased. Innovative financial instruments often generate skepticism, and few have generated more controversy than high yield debt. Some argue that the debt instrument itself, sometimes dubbed "turbo debt", was the cornerstone of the 1980s "Decade of Greed". However, junk bonds were actually used in less than 25% of acquisitions, and hostile takeovers during that period. Nevertheless, by 1990 default rates on high yield debt had increased from 4% to 10%, further eroding confidence in this financial instrument. Without Milken's cheerleading, the liquidity of the junk bond market dried up. Drexel was forced to buy the bonds of insolvent and failing companies, which depleted their capital and would eventually bankrupt the company.

== Survivors ==
A few other firms emerged or became more important from Drexel's collapse, besides Burnham Financial.

- There was also the 1838 Group named after the founding date of Drexel established by another group of investment fund managers. The funds suffered from under performance and the group folded.
- Drexel Burnham Lambert Real Estate Associates II operates as a real estate management firm.
- Apollo Global Management, a private equity firm, was founded by Drexel alumni Leon Black, Josh Harris, and Marc Rowan following the company's bankruptcy.
- Richard Handler joined Jefferies Group immediately following the Drexel bankruptcy with a number of partners and began building the firm into what today is the largest, independent, full service, global investment bank (non bank-holding company).
- Fred Joseph bought into a firm founded by John Adams Morgan to establish Morgan Joseph, a middle-market investment bank that caters to many of the same kinds of clients as Drexel had. In 2011, the firm merged with Tri-Artisan Partners, a merchant bank, to form Morgan Joseph TriArtisan. Although the firm carried Joseph's name and he was part-owner, he was only co-head of corporate finance until his death in 2009. In 1993, the SEC barred him from serving as president, chairman or CEO of a securities firm for life for failing to properly supervise Milken. Morgan Joseph TriArtisan's chairman and CEO is John Sorte, Joseph's successor as president and CEO of Drexel from 1990 to 1992. In 2011, Portfolio.com and CNBC named Joseph the seventh-worst CEO in American business history, saying that "his poor management left the company without a crisis plan."

== Former employees ==
- Peter Ackerman (1946–2022), former head of Drexel's international capital markets department, also political activist and co-founder of the International Center on Nonviolent Conflict and Americans Elect
- Guy Adami, panelist on CNBC's Fast Money
- Leon Black, co-founder of Apollo Global Management
- Joseph Cassano, founder of AIG Financial Products
- Abby Joseph Cohen, partner and chief U.S. investment strategist at Goldman, Sachs & Co
- Jerry Doyle (1956–2016), actor and talk radio host
- Marc Faber, formerly managing director of Drexel's Hong Kong office, famous for the Gloom Boom & Doom Report investment report; "Dr Doom"
- Nigel Farage, leader of Reform UK
- Steve Feinberg, Cerberus Capital Management
- Gerard Finneran, cofounder of TCW Group later arrested after 1995 air rage incident
- James Stephen Fossett (1944–2007), aviator, sailor, and adventurer
- Mark Gilbert, Major League Baseball player, and US ambassador to New Zealand and Samoa
- Joel Greenblatt, founder of Gotham Capital
- Richard B. Handler, current CEO of Jefferies & Company
- Josh Harris, co-founder of Apollo Global Management
- Roderick M. Hills (1931–2014), former chairman of U.S. Securities and Exchange Commission (SEC)
- Frederick H. Joseph (1937—2009), co-founder of Morgan Joseph
- Mark N. Kaplan, former CEO of Drexel from 1970 to 1977, CEO of Engelhard, and senior partner at Skadden
- Jack Langer (born 1948/1949), basketball player and investment banker
- Dennis Levine, chairman & CEO, Adasar Group, Inc.
- Michael Milken, former head of the non-investment-grade bond department; almost single-handedly created the market for "high-yield bonds" (also known as "junk bonds")
- Ken Moelis, former president and head of investment banking at UBS; founder of Moelis & Company
- Anthony J. Parkinson, former senior vice president, later co-founder Kronos; European VP Hasbro
- Terren Peizer, former CEO of Ontrak Inc., convicted of insider trading and securities fraud
- Tony Ressler, former senior vice president, high yield bond market
- Marc Rowan, co-founder and CEO of Apollo Global Management
- Richard Sandor, chairman of the Chicago Climate Exchange
- Rick Santelli, current on-air editor for CNBC's Squawk on the Street, known for remarks on CNBC in 2009 which were credited with helping ignite the Tea Party movement.
- Tom Sosnoff, founder of the thinkorswim trading platform and current CEO of tastytrade.com
- Gary Winnick, founder and former chairman of Global Crossing
