= Fred Joseph =

CEO of Drexel Burnham Lambert

Frederick H. Joseph
- Born: April 22, 1937; Boston, Massachusetts
- Died: November 27, 2009 (aged 72); New York City
- Education: Harvard University (BA, 1959); Harvard Business School (MBA, 1963)
- Occupation: Investment banking
- Years active: 1963-2009
- Employer(s): E. F. Hutton; Shearson, Hammill & Co. Drexel Burnham Lambert; Clovebrook Capital; ING Barings; Morgan Joseph & Co.

Frederick H. Joseph (April 22, 1937 — November 27, 2009) was the former president and chief executive officer of the investment bank Drexel Burnham Lambert during the 1980s.

== Biography ==
The Wall Street Journal noted that he was, "The son of an orthodox Jewish cab driver and a dental hygienist, Mr. Joseph was born in 1937 and grew up in Dorchester, Massachusetts". While at Harvard, Joseph won several Harvard Boxing Club medals. Joseph was of Russian and Lithuanian descent. Although raised Orthodox, as an adult he ceased to practice.

In 1963, Joseph began his career in finance in the corporate finance department of E. F. Hutton working for John S.R. Shad. Following Shad's departure from Hutton, Joseph left the firm as well to join Shearson, Hammill & Co. By the early 1970s, Joseph was Shearson's chief operating officer, the number-two post in the firm. However, in 1974, Shearson was acquired by Hayden, Stone & Co. and Joseph left the firm to join Drexel Burnham Lambert as co-head of corporate finance. Although Drexel was only a second-tier firm at the time, Joseph knew he had no hope of becoming president of what was now Shearson Hayden Stone, headed by Sanford Weill. Additionally, he had long wanted to get back into investment banking. He boldly promised that in 10 years, Drexel would be as powerful as Goldman Sachs. Although junk-bond chief Michael Milken was the most powerful man in the firm, it was Joseph who was named president in 1984 and CEO in 1985. By this time, Drexel had more than fulfilled his bold promise, and had grown to become the fifth-largest investment bank in the nation.

In 1988, Joseph was responsible for negotiating Drexel's settlement with the federal government, in which the firm entered an Alford plea to six felony counts and paid $650 million in fines and penalties—at the time, the largest fine ever imposed under the 1930s securities laws. In 1990, the New York Stock Exchange banned him from holding any management role in a firm affiliated with the exchange for three years. In 1993, the SEC barred Joseph for life from serving as president, chairman or CEO of a securities firm. Both the NYSE and SEC faulted Joseph for not properly supervising Milken. In 2009, Portfolio.com and CNBC named Joseph the seventh-worst CEO in American business history, stating that his over-reliance on Milken's junk-bond unit "left the company without a crisis plan."

After three years as a consultant for Drexel as it wended its way through bankruptcy, Joseph served as head of Clovebrook Capital, a corporate finance consulting firm, from 1994 to 1998. He then became head of corporate finance at the American subsidiary of ING Barings from 1998 to 2001. After losing a bid to buy ING Barings' American operations, Joseph co-founded Morgan Joseph & Company, an investment banking firm that focuses on middle-market businesses, catering to a clientele that Drexel served in its heyday. Although the firm carried his name and he was part-owner, he was only co-head of corporate finance as a result of the SEC's lifetime ban.

Joseph died on Friday, November 27, 2009 from complications of multiple myeloma. He was survived by his five children and seven grandchildren.
