= Michael Milken =

American financier, racketeer and securities fraudster (born 1946)

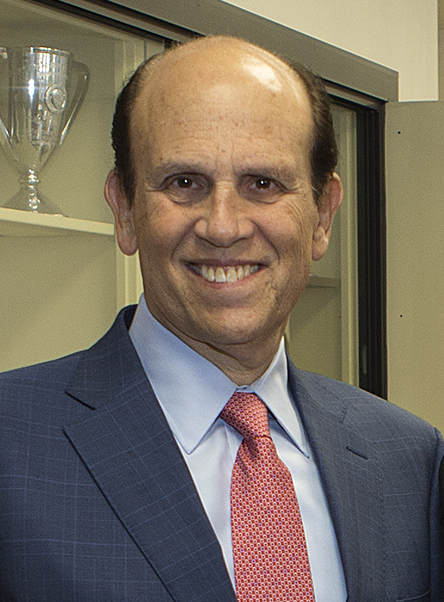
- Milken in 2014
- Born: Michael Robert Milken; July 4, 1946 (age 80); Encino, California, U.S.
- Education: University of California, Berkeley (BS); University of Pennsylvania (MBA)
- Occupations: Businessman; financier
- Known for: Developing the high-yield bond market
- Criminal charges: Securities and reporting violations (1989)
- Criminal penalty: Served 22 months in prison $600 million fine
- Criminal status: Released; Pardoned (February 18, 2020)
- Spouse: Lori Hackel (m. 1968)
- Children: 3
- Relatives: Lowell Milken (brother)
- Website: www.mikemilken.com

Michael Robert Milken (born July 4, 1946) is an American financier. He is known for his role in the development of the market for high-yield bonds ("junk bonds"), which led to his reputation as the "Junk Bond King", and his conviction and sentence following a guilty plea on felony charges for violating U.S. securities laws. Milken's compensation while head of the high-yield bond department at Drexel Burnham Lambert in the late 1980s exceeded $1 billion over a four-year period, a record for U.S. income at that time.

Milken was indicted for racketeering and securities fraud in 1989 in an insider trading investigation. In a plea bargain, he pleaded guilty to securities and reporting violations but not to racketeering or insider trading. Milken was sentenced to ten years in prison, fined $600 million (although his personal website claims $200 million), and permanently barred from the securities industry by the U.S. Securities and Exchange Commission. His sentence was later reduced to two years for cooperating with testimony against his former colleagues and for good behavior. Milken was pardoned by President Donald Trump in February 2020.

Milken is a co-founder of the Milken Family Foundation, chairman of the Milken Institute, and founder of medical philanthropies funding research on melanoma, cancer, and other life-threatening diseases. A prostate cancer survivor, Milken has devoted significant resources to research on the disease.

== Early life and education ==
Milken was born into a middle-class Jewish family in Encino, California. He graduated from Birmingham High School where he was the head cheerleader and worked at a diner while in school. His classmates included future Disney president Michael Ovitz and actresses Sally Field and Cindy Williams. In 1968, he graduated from the University of California, Berkeley, with a BS with highest honors. He was elected to Phi Beta Kappa and was a member of the Sigma Alpha Mu fraternity. He then received his MBA from the Wharton School of the University of Pennsylvania. While at Berkeley, Milken was influenced by credit studies authored by W. Braddock Hickman, a former president of the Federal Reserve Bank of Cleveland, who noted that a portfolio of non-investment grade bonds offered "risk-adjusted" returns greater than that of an investment-grade portfolio.

== Career ==
Through his Wharton professors, Milken landed a summer job at Drexel Harriman Ripley, an old-line investment bank, in 1969. After completing his MBA, he joined Drexel (by then known as Drexel Firestone) as director of low-grade bond research. He was also given control of some capital and permitted to trade. Over the next 17 years, he had only four down months.

Drexel merged with Burnham and Company in 1973 to form Drexel Burnham. Despite the firm's name, Burnham was effectively the sole survivor; the Drexel name came first only at the insistence of the more powerful investment banks, whose blessing was necessary for the merged firm to inherit Drexel's position as a "major" firm. Milken was one of the few prominent holdovers from the Drexel side of the merger, and he became the merged firm's head of convertibles. He persuaded his new boss, fellow Wharton alumnus Tubby Burnham, to let him start a high-yield bond trading department—an operation that soon earned a 100 percent return on investment. By 1976, Milken's income at the firm, which had become Drexel Burnham Lambert, was estimated at $5 million a year. In 1978, Milken moved the high-yield bond operation to Century City in Los Angeles.

=== High-yield bonds and leveraged buyouts ===
By the mid-1980s, Milken's network of high-yield bond buyers (notably Fred Carr's Executive Life Insurance Company and Tom Spiegel's Columbia Savings & Loan) had reached a size that enabled him to raise large amounts of money quickly. This money-raising ability also facilitated the activities of leveraged buyout (LBO) firms such as Kohlberg Kravis Roberts and of the so-called "greenmailers". Most of them were armed with a "highly confident letter" from Drexel, a tool Drexel's corporate finance wing crafted that promised to raise the necessary debt in time to fulfill the buyer's obligations. It carried no legal status, but by that time Milken had a reputation for being able to make markets for any bonds that he underwrote. For this reason, "highly confident letters" were considered to reliably demonstrate capacity to pay.

Supporters, like George Gilder in his book Telecosm (2000), state that Milken was "a key source of the organizational changes that have impelled economic growth over the last twenty years. Most striking was the productivity surge in capital, as Milken ... and others took the vast sums trapped in old-line businesses and put them back into the markets." Despite his influence in the financial world during the 1980s, (at least one source called him the most powerful American financier since J. P. Morgan), Milken is an intensely private man who shuns publicity; he reportedly owned almost all photographs taken of him.

=== Later career ===
Milken and his brother Lowell founded Knowledge Universe in 1996, as well as Knowledge Learning Corporation (KLC), the parent company of KinderCare Learning Centers, the largest for-profit child care provider in the country. Michael Milken was chairman of Knowledge Universe until it was sold in 2015. He invested in K12 Inc., a publicly traded education management organization (EMO) that provides online schooling, including to charter school students, for whom services are paid by tax dollars, which is the largest EMO in terms of enrollment.

== Scandal ==
Dan Stone, a former Drexel executive, wrote in his book April Fools that Milken was under nearly constant scrutiny from the Securities and Exchange Commission from 1979 onward due to unethical and sometimes illegal behavior in the high-yield department. Milken's role in such behavior has been much debated. Stone claims that Milken viewed the securities laws, rules, and regulations with a degree of contempt, feeling they hindered the free flow of trade. However, Stone said that while Milken condoned questionable and illegal acts by his colleagues, Milken himself personally followed the rules. Milken often contacted Fred Joseph, Drexel's president and CEO, with ethical questions; Joseph was known for his strict view of the securities laws.

On the other hand, several of the sources James B. Stewart used for Den of Thieves told him that Milken often tried to get as much as five times the maximum markup on trades that was permitted at the time. Harvey A. Silverglate, a defense attorney who represented Milken during the appellate process, disputes that view in his book Three Felonies a Day: "Milken's biggest problem was that some of his most ingenious but entirely lawful maneuvers were viewed, by those who initially did not understand them, as felonious, precisely because they were novel – and often extremely profitable."

=== Ivan Boesky and an intensifying investigation ===
The SEC inquiries never advanced beyond the investigation phase until 1986, when arbitrageur Ivan Boesky pleaded guilty to securities fraud as part of a larger insider trading investigation. As part of his plea, Boesky implicated Milken in several illegal transactions, including insider trading, stock manipulation, fraud, and stock parking (buying stocks for the benefit of another). This led to an SEC probe of Drexel, as well as a separate criminal probe by Rudy Giuliani, then United States Attorney for the Southern District of New York. Although both investigations were almost entirely focused on Milken's department, Milken refused to talk with Drexel (which launched its own internal investigation) except through his lawyers. It turned out that Milken's legal team believed Drexel would be forced to cooperate with the government at some point, believing that a securities firm would not survive the bad publicity of a long criminal and SEC probe.

For two years, Drexel insisted that nothing illegal had occurred, even when the SEC sued Drexel in 1988. Later that year, Giuliani began considering an indictment of Drexel under the powerful Racketeer Influenced and Corrupt Organizations (RICO) Act. Drexel management, concluding that a financial institution could not possibly survive a RICO indictment, immediately began plea bargain talks. However, talks collapsed on December 19, when Giuliani made several demands that went beyond even what those who believed an indictment would destroy the firm were willing to accept. For example, Giuliani demanded that Milken leave the firm if indicted.

Only a day later, Drexel lawyers discovered suspicious activity in one of the limited partnerships Milken set up to allow members of his department to make their own investments. That entity, MacPherson Partners, had acquired several warrants for the stock of Storer Broadcasting in 1985. At the time, Kohlberg Kravis Roberts was in the midst of a leveraged buyout of Storer, and Drexel was lead underwriter for the bonds being issued. One of Drexel's other clients bought several Storer warrants and sold them back to the high-yield bond department. The department in turn sold them to MacPherson. This partnership included Milken, other Drexel executives, and a few Drexel customers. It also included several managers of money market funds who had worked with Milken in the past. It appeared that the money managers bought the warrants for themselves and did not offer the same opportunity to the funds they managed. Some of Milken's children also received warrants, according to Stewart, raising the appearance of Milken self-dealing.

The warrants to money managers were especially problematic. At the very least, Milken's actions were a serious breach of Drexel's internal regulations, and the money managers had breached their fiduciary duty to their clients. At worst, the warrants could have been construed as bribes to the money managers, to influence decisions they made for their funds. Several money managers were eventually convicted on bribery charges. The discovery of MacPherson Partners—whose existence had not been known to the public at the time—seriously eroded Milken's credibility with the board. On December 21, 1988, Drexel entered an Alford plea to six counts of stock parking and stock manipulation. It allowed Drexel to maintain its innocence while conceding that it "was not in a position to dispute" the allegations made by the government. As part of the deal, Drexel agreed that Milken had to leave the firm if indicted.

=== Indictment and sentencing ===
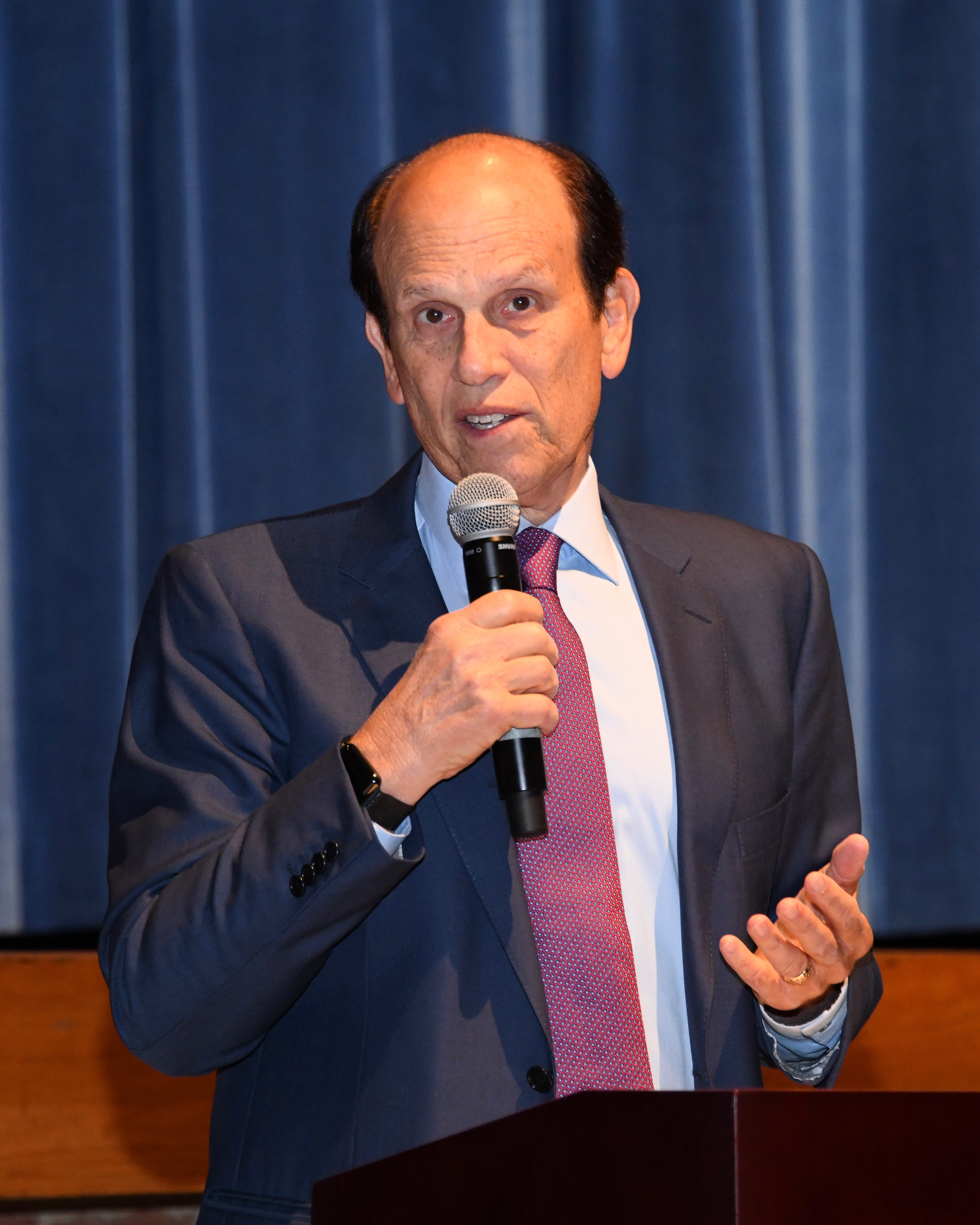
Milken in 2018

In March 1989, a federal grand jury indicted Milken, Lowell Milken, and Bruce L. Newberg, a former Drexel junk bond trader, on 98 counts of racketeering, mail fraud and securities fraud and sought $1.845 billion in forfeitures. The indictment included a long list of misconduct, including insider trading, tax evasion, stock manipulation, tax fraud, stock parking (concealing "Drexel's ownership of 6f securities by causing the securities to be secretly purchased or sold through affiliates of Boesky or Princeton/Newport for the purpose of gaining secret and unlawful advantages and profits in corporate takeover contests"), and other crimes. One charge was that Boesky paid Drexel $5.3 million in 1986 for Milken's share of profits from illegal trading. This payment was represented as a consulting fee to Drexel. Shortly afterward, Milken resigned from Drexel and formed his own firm, International Capital Access Group.

Milken's protege Terren Peizer had worked as a junk bond salesman for Milken, managing an account with which Drexel had an illegal arrangement that included insider trading and phony tax losses. Peizer provided material evidence to prosecutors against Milken. At Milken's pre-sentencing hearing for securities fraud in 1990, Peizer testified against Milken in exchange for immunity from both criminal prosecution and SEC sanctions. On April 24, 1990, Milken pleaded guilty to six counts of securities and tax violations. Three of them involved dealings with Boesky to conceal the real owner of a stock:

- Aiding and abetting another person's failure to file an accurate 13d statement with the SEC, since the schedule was not amended to reflect an understanding that any loss would be made up
- Sending confirmation slips through the mail that failed to disclose that a commission was included in the price
- Aiding and abetting another in filing inaccurate broker-dealer reports with the SEC

Two other counts were related to tax evasion in transactions Milken carried out for a client of the firm, David Solomon, then a fund manager:

- Selling stock without disclosure of an understanding that the purchaser would not lose money
- Agreeing to sell securities to a customer and to buy those securities back at a real loss to the customer, but with an understanding that he would try to find a future profitable transaction to make up for any losses

The last count was for conspiracy to commit these five violations. As part of his plea, Milken agreed to pay $200 million in fines. At the same time, he agreed to a settlement with the SEC in which he paid $400 million to investors who had been hurt by his actions. He also accepted a lifetime ban from any involvement in the securities industry. In a related civil lawsuit against Drexel, he agreed to pay $500 million to Drexel's investors.

Critics of the government charge that the government indicted Milken's brother Lowell to pressure Milken to settle, a tactic some legal scholars condemn as unethical. "I am troubled by – and other scholars are troubled by – the notion of putting relatives on the bargaining table," said Vivian Berger, a professor at Columbia University Law School, in a 1990 interview with The New York Times. As part of the deal, the case against Lowell was dropped. Federal investigators also questioned some of Milken's relatives about their investments. At Milken's sentencing, Judge Kimba Wood told him:

You were willing to commit only crimes that were unlikely to be detected. ... When a man of your power in the financial world ... repeatedly conspires to violate, and violates, securities and tax business in order to achieve more power and wealth for himself ... a significant prison term is required.

In statements to a parole board in 1991, Judge Wood estimated that the "total loss from Milken's crimes" was $318,000 less than the government's estimate of $4.7 million, and she recommended that he be eligible for parole in three years. Milken's sentence was later reduced to two years from ten; he served 22 months.

=== 2013 SEC investigation ===
In February 2013, the SEC announced that they were investigating whether Milken violated his lifetime ban from the securities industry. The investigation concerned Milken's allegedly providing investment advice through Guggenheim Partners. Since 2011, the SEC had been investigating Guggenheim's relationship with Milken.

=== Presidential pardon ===
February 2020 pardon granted by Donald Trump

In June 2018, it was reported that some of president Donald Trump's supporters and friends, including Kevin McCarthy, Rupert Murdoch, Sheldon Adelson, Elaine Chao, and Rudy Giuliani, the onetime federal prosecutor whose criminal investigation led to Milken's conviction, were urging the president to pardon Milken. Milken's attempts to secure a presidential pardon spanned multiple administrations. On February 18, 2020, Trump granted a full pardon to Milken. However, his previous trading license which he lost following his conviction still remained void, and he would still have to reapply and obtain a new trading license in order to return to trading securities.

== Philanthropy ==
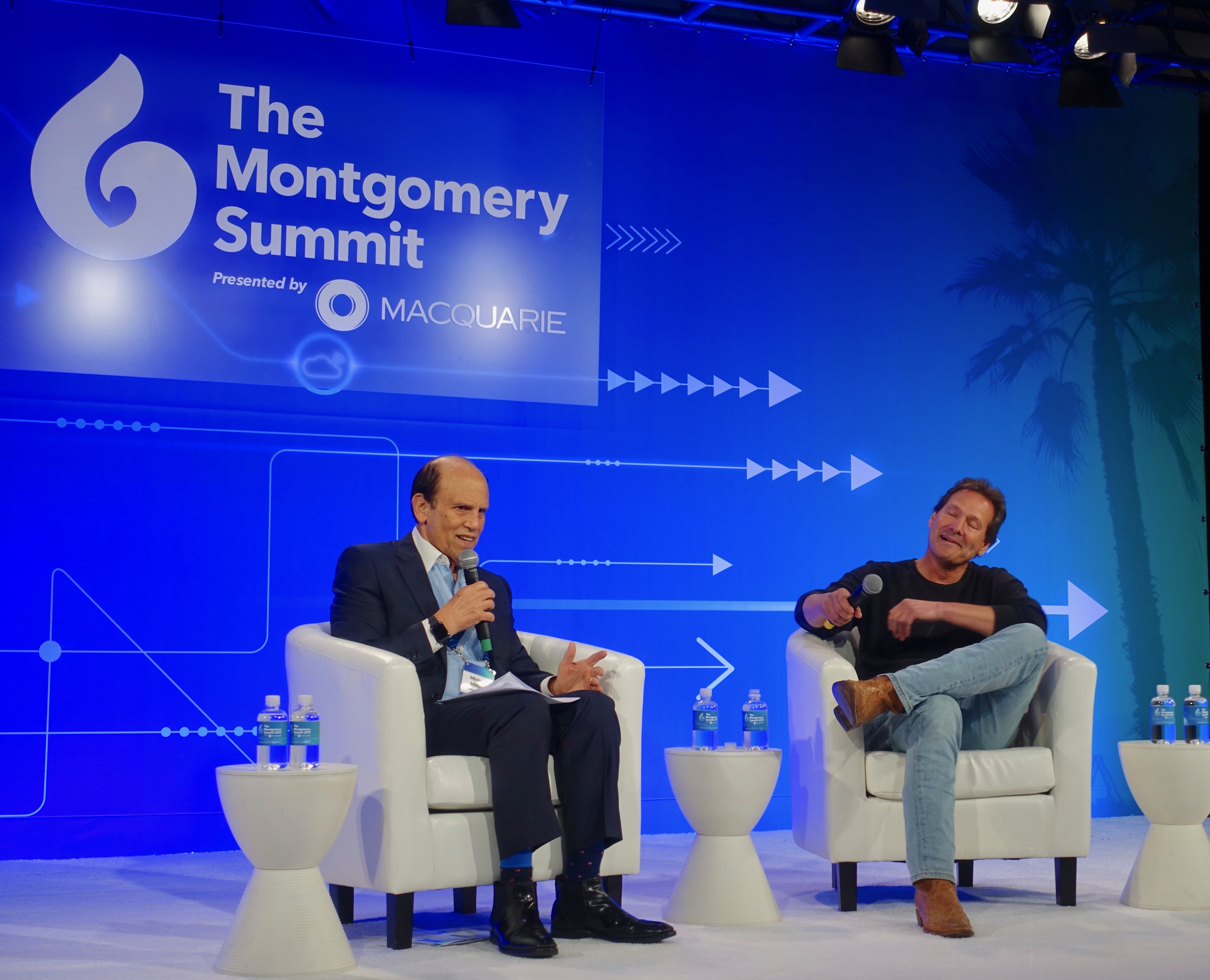
Milken speaks with PayPal CEO Dan Schulman, 2019.

According to Forbes, Milken has given away between 5–10% of his fortune, earning a philanthropy score of 3 out of 5. Upon his release from prison in 1993, Milken founded the Prostate Cancer Foundation for prostate cancer research, which by 2010 was "the largest philanthropic source of funds for research into prostate cancer". Milken himself was diagnosed with advanced prostate cancer in the same month he was released.

His cancer is in remission. The Prostate Cancer Foundation works closely with Major League Baseball through its Home Run Challenge program to promote awareness of prostate cancer and raise money for medical research. Each season in the weeks leading up to Father's Day, Milken visits many ballparks and appears on TV and radio broadcasts during the games. In 2003, Milken launched a Washington, D.C.–based think tank called FasterCures, which seeks greater efficiency in researching all serious diseases. Initiatives of FasterCures include TRAIN, Partnering for Cures, and the Philanthropy Advisory Service.

In March 2014, President Steven Knapp of George Washington University in Washington, D.C. announced the university was renaming its public health school after Milken as a result of a total of $80 million in gifts, $50 million from the Milken Institute and the Milken Family Foundation and $30 million gift from Viacom chairman Sumner Redstone. The gifts were designated for research and scholarship on public health issues. In September 2025, Milken officially opened the Milken Center for Advancing the American Dream (MCAAD) next to the White House in Washington, D.C., an interactive museum that features artists, entrepreneurs, and innovators in health and education. MCAAD also highlights the American financial system.

== In popular culture ==
Milken became the first recipient of the Ig Nobel Economics Prize in 1991. He is also a character in the 1991 film Pizza Man, where he is portrayed by actor Jim Jackman. Milken is referenced by Chris Stevens in the 1994 Northern Exposure episode "The Robe" (season 6, episode 5) at 31:29: "Trust and honesty. The age-old quest of Diogenes in a post-Milken universe." He is referenced by Hank Scorpio in the 1996 The Simpsons episode "You Only Move Twice". Milken is referenced in the 2002 Futurama episode "Future Stock". Ayad Akhtar's 2016 play Junk, set during the bond trading scandals of the 1980s, is partly based on Milken's "fall from grace". Milken is the inspiration for the main character in the play.

== Personal life ==
Milken is married to Lori Anne Hackel, whom he had dated in high school. The couple has three children. He reportedly follows a vegetarian-like diet rich in fruits and vegetables, and has co-authored two vegan cookbooks with Beth Ginsberg.

== See also ==
- List of Ig Nobel Prize winners
- List of people granted executive clemency by Donald Trump
- Savings and loan crisis
