= James B. Stewart =

American lawyer, journalist, and author (born c. 1952)

- Born: James Bennett Stewart c. 1952 (age 73–74); Quincy, Illinois, U.S.
- Education: DePauw University (BA); Harvard University (JD)
- Occupations: Non-fiction writer; lawyer; journalist
- Writing career
- Period: 1983–present
- Notable work: Den of Thieves
- Notable awards: Pulitzer Prize for Explanatory Journalism (1988)

James Bennett Stewart (born c. 1952) is an American lawyer, journalist, and author.

== Early life and education ==
Stewart was born in Quincy, Illinois. He graduated from DePauw University and Harvard Law School.

== Career ==
He is a member of the Bar of New York, the Bloomberg Professor of Business and Economic Journalism at the Columbia University Graduate School of Journalism, Editor-at-Large of SmartMoney magazine, and author of Tangled Webs: How False Statements are Undermining America: From Martha Stewart to Bernie Madoff (2011). He is a former associate at New York law firm Cravath, Swaine & Moore, which he left in 1979 to become executive editor of The American Lawyer magazine. He later joined The Wall Street Journal, where earned the 1987 Gerald Loeb Award for Deadline and/or Beat Writing. He shared the 1988 Pulitzer Prize for Explanatory Journalism and the Gerald Loeb Award for Large Newspapers for his articles about the 1987 dramatic upheaval in the stock market and insider trading. Stewart became page one editor of The Wall Street Journal in 1988 and remained at the paper until 1992, when he left to help found SmartMoney.

Stewart's book Blind Eye: The Terrifying Story Of A Doctor Who Got Away With Murder (1999), won the 2000 Edgar Award in the Best Fact Crime category. DisneyWar (2005), his book on Michael Eisner's reign at Disney, won the Gerald Loeb Award for Best Business Book. In 2007, he was ranked 21st on Out magazine's 50 Most Powerful Gay Men and Women in America. He is currently a contributor to The New Yorker and a columnist for The New York Times, which he joined in 2011. Stewart also serves on the board of advisory trustees of his alma mater, DePauw University, and is past president of that board.

== Notable stories ==
=== Jeffrey Epstein ===
On August 12, 2019, Stewart reported on a conversation he had with convicted sex offender Jeffrey Epstein. Epstein reportedly told Stewart that he was advising Elon Musk and Tesla. Stewart was also told by Epstein that he had dirt on powerful people including personal details about their sexual activities and drug use.

On July 31, 2019, Stewart along with Matthew Goldstein and Jessica Silver-Greenberg reported about Epstein's interest in Eugenics and how he wished to seed the human race by using his own DNA. He also reportedly wanted his head and penis frozen. That same year Stewart and Emily Flitter partnered on a piece which provided more detail as to Epstein's relationship with Microsoft founder Bill Gates, which had started after Epstein had become a registered sex offender.

=== Michael Milken ===
In the 1980s, Stewart reported heavily on Wall Street and specifically the illicit activities of junk bond king Michael Milken. According to Stewart he attempted to meet Milken at a conference at The Beverly Hilton but shortly after meeting him he was removed from the hotel by security. His reporting on Milken culminated in a book called Den of Thieves (1991), which recounted the criminal conduct of Wall Street arbitrager Ivan Boesky and Milken.

== Bibliography ==
=== Books ===
External videos
- Booknotes interview with Stewart on Den of Thieves, November 24, 1991, C-SPAN
- Presentation by Stewart on Blood Sport, April 17, 1996, C-SPAN
- Presentation by Stewart on Blood Sport, May 13, 1996, C-SPAN
- Interview with Stewart on Follow the Story, October 10, 1998, C-SPAN
- Presentation by Stewart on Blind Eye, September 17, 1999, C-SPAN
- Presentation by Stewart on Heart of a Soldier, February 22, 2003, C-SPAN
- Presentation by Stewart on DisneyWar, November 19, 2005, C-SPAN
- Presentation by Stewart on Deep State, October 10, 2019, C-SPAN

- Stewart, James (1983). The Partners: Inside America's Most Powerful Law Firms. New York: Simon & Schuster. ISBN 0-671-42023-2.
- Stewart, James (1987). Prosecutors. New York: Simon & Schuster. ISBN 0-671-66835-8.
- Stewart, James (1991). Den of Thieves. New York: Simon & Schuster. ISBN 0-671-63802-5.
- Stewart, James (1997). Blood Sport: The President and His Adversaries. London: Touchstone. ISBN 0-684-83139-2.
- Stewart, James (1998). Follow the Story: How to Write Successful Nonfiction. New York: Simon & Schuster. ISBN 0-684-85067-2.
- Stewart, James (1999). Blind Eye: How the Medical Establishment Let a Doctor Get Away With Murder. New York City: Simon & Schuster. ISBN 0-684-85484-8.
- Stewart, James (2002). Heart of a Soldier: A Story of Love, Heroism, and September 11th. New York: Simon & Schuster. ISBN 0-7432-4098-7.; a biography of Rick Rescorla, Morgan Stanley security director who died at WTC
- Stewart, James (2005). DisneyWar. New York: Simon & Schuster. ISBN 0-684-80993-1.
- Stewart, James (2011). Tangled Webs: How False Statements are Undermining America: From Martha Stewart to Bernie Madoff. New York: Penguin Press. ISBN 978-1-59420-269-8.
- Stewart, James (2019). Deep State: Trump, the FBI, and the Rule of Law. Penguin Press. ISBN 978-0525559108.
- Stewart, James (2023). Unscripted: The Epic Battle for a Media Empire and the Redstone Family Legacy. Penguin Press. ISBN 978-1984879424. (with Rachel Abrams)

=== Essays and reporting ===
- Stewart, James B. (September 14, 2009). "Eight Days The battle to save the American financial system". The New Yorker.
- Stewart, James B. (March 23, 2015). "A fight at the opera : Peter Gelb has a bold vision. Can the Met afford it?". The New Yorker. Vol. 91, no. 5. pp. 56–67.

== Awards ==
Stewart was inducted as a Laureate of The Lincoln Academy of Illinois and awarded the Order of Lincoln (the State's highest honor) by the Governor of Illinois in 2002 in the area of Communications.

In 1996 Stewart received an honorary doctorate from Quincy University.

Stewart has earned five Gerald Loeb Awards: the 1987 Deadline and/or Beat Writing award for "Coverage of Wall Street Insider Trading Scandal", the 1988 Large Newspapers award for "Terrible Tuesday", the 2006 Business Book award for "DisneyWar", the 2016 Commentary award for "Inside the Boardroom", and the 2019 Feature award for "'If Bobbie Talks, I'm Finished': How Les Moonves Tried to Silence an Accuser".

== See also ==
- Deep state in the United States
- List of conspiracy theories § deep state
