= High-yield debt =

Financial product

In finance, a high-yield bond (non-investment-grade bond, speculative-grade bond, or junk bond) is a bond that is rated below investment grade by credit rating agencies. These bonds have a higher risk of default or other adverse credit events but offer higher yields than investment-grade bonds to compensate for the increased risk.

== Default risk ==
As indicated by their lower credit ratings, high-yield debt entails more risk to the investor compared to investment grade bonds. Investors require a greater yield to compensate them for investing in the riskier securities.

In the case of high-yield bonds, the risk is largely that of default: the possibility that the issuer will be unable to make scheduled interest and principal payments in a timely manner.^{:208} The default rate in the high-yield sector of the U.S. bond market has averaged about 5% over the long term. During the liquidity crisis of 1989–90, the default rate was in the 5.6% to 7% range. During the COVID-19 pandemic, default rates rose to just under 9%.^{:209} A recession and accompanying weakening of business conditions tends to increase the possibility of default in the high-yield bond sector.

== Investors ==
Institutional investors (such as pension funds, mutual funds, banks, and insurance companies) are the largest purchasers of high-yield debt. Individual investors participate in the high-yield sector mainly through mutual funds.^{:211}

Some institutional investors have by-laws that prohibit investing in bonds which have ratings below a particular level. As a result, the lower-rated securities may have a different institutional investor base than investment-grade bonds.

== U.S. market and indices ==
U.S. high-yield bonds outstanding as of the first quarter of 2022 are estimated to be about $1.8 trillion, comprising about 16% of the U.S. corporate bond market, which totals $10.7 trillion. New issuances amounted to $435 billion (~$518 billion in 2024) in 2020.

Indices for the high-yield market include:

- ICE Bank of America US High Yield Total Return Index,
- Bloomberg Barclays US Corporate High Yield Total Return Index,
- S&P U.S. Issued High Yield Corporate Bond Index, and
- FTSE US High-Yield Market Index.

Some investors, preferring to dedicate themselves to higher-rated and less-risky investments, use an index that only includes BB-rated and B-rated securities. Other investors focus on the lowest quality debt rated CCC or distressed securities, commonly defined as those yielding 1,000 basis points over equivalent government bonds.

== Usage ==
=== Corporate debt ===
The original speculative grade bonds were bonds that had been investment grade at the time of issue, but the credit rating of the issuer had slipped and the possibility of default increased significantly. These bonds are called "fallen angels".

The investment banker Michael Milken realized that fallen angels had regularly been valued less than what they were worth. His experience with speculative grade bonds started with his investment in these. In the mid-1980s, Milken and other investment bankers at Drexel Burnham Lambert created a new type of high-yield debt: bonds that were speculative grade from the start, and were used as a financing tool in leveraged buyouts (LBOs) and hostile takeovers.^{:208} In a LBO, an acquirer would issue speculative grade bonds to help pay for an acquisition and then use the target's cash flow to help pay the debt over time. Companies acquired in this manner were commonly saddled with very high debt loads, hampering their financial flexibility. Debt-to-equity ratios of at least 6 to 1 were common in such transactions. This led to controversy as to the economic and social consequences of transforming firms through the aggressive use of financial leverage.

In 2005, over 80% of the principal amount of high-yield debt issued by U.S. companies went toward corporate purposes rather than acquisitions or buyouts.

In emerging markets, such as China and Vietnam, bonds have become increasingly important as short-term financing options since access to traditional bank credit has been proved to be limited, especially if borrowers are non-state corporates. The corporate bond market has been developing in line with the general trend of capital markets, and the equity market in particular.

=== Debt repackaging and subprime crisis ===
High-yield bonds can also be repackaged into collateralized debt obligations (CDO), thereby raising the credit rating of the senior tranches above the rating of the original debt. The senior tranches of high-yield CDOs can thus meet the minimum credit rating requirements of pension funds and other institutional investors despite the significant risk in the original high-yield debt.

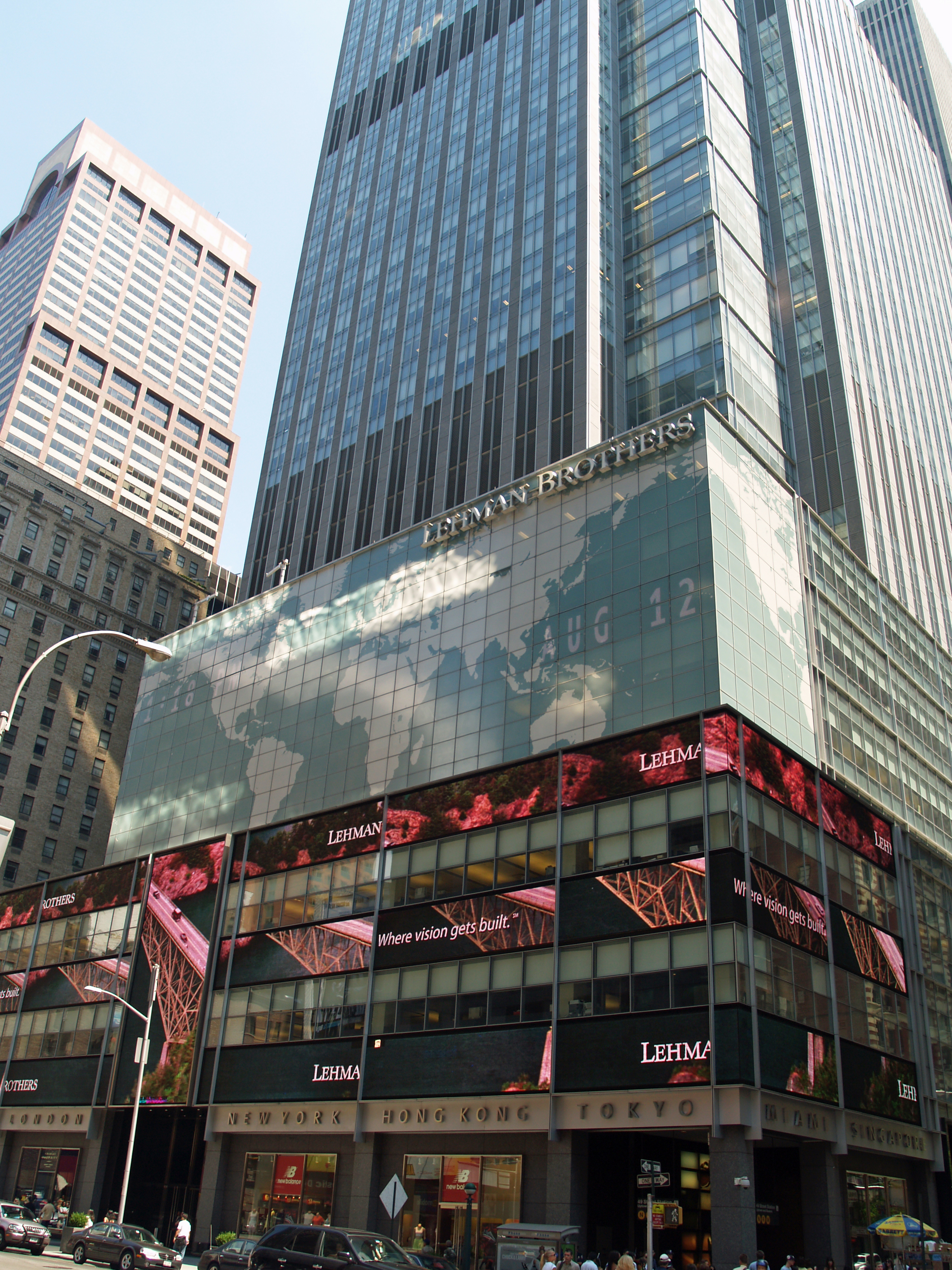
The New York City headquarters of Barclays (formerly Lehman Brothers, as shown in the picture). In background, the AXA Center, headquarters of AXA, first worldwide insurance company.

When such CDOs are backed by assets of dubious value, such as subprime mortgage loans, and lose market liquidity, the bonds and their derivatives become what is referred to as "toxic debt". Holding such "toxic" assets led to the demise of several investment banks such as Lehman Brothers and other financial institutions during the subprime mortgage crisis of 2007–09 and led the US Treasury to seek congressional appropriations to buy those assets in September 2008 to prevent a systemic crisis of the banks.

Such assets represent a serious problem for purchasers because of their complexity. Having been repackaged perhaps several times, it is difficult and time-consuming for auditors and accountants to determine their true value. As the recession of 2008–09 hit, their value decreased further as more debtors defaulted, so they represented a rapidly depreciating asset. Even those assets that might have gone up in value in the long-term depreciated rapidly, quickly becoming "toxic" for the banks that held them. Toxic assets, by increasing the variance of banks' assets, can turn otherwise healthy institutions into zombies. Potentially insolvent banks made too few good loans creating a debt overhang problem. Alternatively, potentially insolvent banks with toxic assets sought out very risky speculative loans to shift risk onto their depositors and other creditors.

On 23 March 2009, U.S. Treasury Secretary Timothy Geithner announced a Public-Private Investment Partnership (PPIP) to buy toxic assets from banks' balance sheets. The major stock market indices in the United States rallied on the day of the announcement rising by over six percent with the shares of bank stocks leading the way. PPIP has two primary programs. The Legacy Loans Program will attempt to buy residential loans from banks' balance sheets. The Federal Deposit Insurance Corporation will provide non-recourse loan guarantees for up to 85 percent of the purchase price of legacy loans. Private sector asset managers and the U.S. Treasury will provide the remaining assets. The second program is called the legacy securities program which will buy mortgage backed securities (RMBS) that were originally rated AAA and commercial mortgage-backed securities (CMBS) and asset-backed securities (ABS) which are rated AAA. The funds will come in many instances in equal parts from the U.S. Treasury's Troubled Asset Relief Program monies, private investors, and from loans from the Federal Reserve's Term Asset Lending Facility (TALF). The initial size of the Public Private Investment Partnership is projected to be $500 billion.

Nobel Prize–winning economist Paul Krugman has been very critical of this program arguing the non-recourse loans lead to a hidden subsidy that will be split by asset managers, banks' shareholders and creditors. Banking analyst Meredith Whitney argues that banks will not sell bad assets at fair market values because they are reluctant to take asset write downs. Removing toxic assets would also reduce the volatility of banks' stock prices. Because stock is akin to a call option on a firm's assets, this lost volatility will hurt the stock price of distressed banks. Therefore, such banks will only sell toxic assets at above market prices.

== EU member state debt crisis ==
On 27 April 2010, the Greek debt rating was decreased to "junk" status by Standard & Poor's amidst fears of default by the Greek Government. They also cut Portugal's credit ratings by two notches to A, over concerns about its government debt and public finances on 28 April. On 5 July 2011, Portugal's rating was decreased to "junk" status by Moody's (by four notches from Baa1 to Ba2) saying there was a growing risk the country would need a second bail-out before it was ready to borrow money from financial markets again, and private lenders might have to contribute.

On 13 July 2012, Moody's cut Italy's credit rating two notches, to Baa2 (leaving it just above junk). Moody's warned the country it could be cut further.

With the ongoing deleveraging process within the European banking system, many European CFOs are still issuing high-yield bonds. As a result, by the end of September 2012, the total amount of annual primary bond issuances stood at €50 billion. It is assumed that high-yield bonds are still attractive for companies with a stable funding base, although the ratings have declined continuously for most of those bonds.

== See also ==
- Mezzanine capital
- Thomson Financial League Tables
