= Pennoyer (surname) =

Pennoyer is a Welsh surname. People with this surname include:

- Albert A. Pennoyer (1848–1908), merchant
- Albert Pennoyer (1888–1957), artist and member of the Monuments Men
- Paul Pennoyer Jr. (1920–2010), American lawyer and Navy veteran
- Paul Pennoyer Sr. (1890–1971), American lawyer and diplomat
- Peter Pennoyer (born 1957), American architect
- Robert Morgan Pennoyer (1925–2023), American lawyer and author
- Sylvester Pennoyer (1831–1902), American politician
- William Pennoyer (1603–1670), British businessman and philanthropist

== See also ==
- Pennoyer
