= Pennoyer =

Pennoyer may refer to:

== People with the surname ==
- Albert Pennoyer (1888-1957), artist and member of the Monuments Men
- Paul Pennoyer Jr. (1920-2010), American lawyer and Navy veteran
- Paul Pennoyer Sr. (1890-1971), American lawyer and diplomat
- Peter Pennoyer (born 1957), American architect
- Robert Morgan Pennoyer (1925-2023), American lawyer and author
- Sylvester Pennoyer (1831–1902), American politician
- William Pennoyer (1603–1670), British businessman and philanthropist

== Other ==
- Pennoyer v. Neff, US legal case.
- Pennoyer School District 79

== See also ==
- Pennoyer (surname)
