= Morgan family =

American family and banking dynasty

- Coat of arms of J. P. Morgan
- Current region: New York City, New York
- Origin: Llandaff, Wales
- Founder: Miles Morgan
- Connected families: Adams political family Cavendish-Bentinck family Hamilton family Livingston family Perry family House of Harcourt; Folch de Cardona; Massimo family

The Morgan family is an American family and banking dynasty, which became prominent in the U.S. and throughout the world in the late 19th century and early 20th century. Members of the family amassed an immense fortune over the generations, primarily through the entrepreneurship of Junius Spencer (J. S.) Morgan (1813–1890) and John Pierpont (J. P.) Morgan Sr. (1837–1913).

Morgan family members dominated the banking industry during their time. The most prominent member of this dynasty was J.P. Morgan, the most influential banker in America at the turn of the century. He revolutionized numerous industries, including the electricity, railroad and steel industries. Through his business methods, he was highly successful in asserting his power as one of the most influential businessmen in America. Historians describe the Morgan family and its web of partners as being part of the large American banking empire known as the House of Morgan.

== History ==
The Morgan family came to some prominence in Wales during the 17th century. Born in Llandaff, Glamorganshire in 1616, Miles Morgan was the son of William Morgan. At the age of 20, Miles sailed for America, along with his brothers, John and James, seeking new opportunities in the New World. Arriving in April 1636, he landed in the Massachusetts Bay Colony. Settling in Roxbury and later Springfield, Massachusetts, Miles met Prudence Gilbert, his future wife. Miles was a soldier during the sack of Springfield. He later worked on a farm and lived a comfortable life. He continued living in the city until the age of eighty-three.

One of his sons, Nathaniel, continued the legacy of the Morgan name by becoming a powerful member of his small town. Nathaniel had many professions in his town, including Fence Viewer, hayward, field driver, constable, surveyor, and assessor. He married Hannah Bird on 19 January 1691, daughter of James Bird of Farmington, Connecticut.

Nathaniel's son, Joseph Morgan, was the fifth of seven children. Born on 3 December 1702, Joseph began to learn to weave at a young age. At the age of 21, he became a soldier in the company of Captain Josiah Kellogg of Suffield. Upon his father's death, he inherited part of Chicopee Field. He married Mary Stebbins in 1735 and raised a family on a farm of two hundred acres. Upon his death, he gave much of his property to sons Joseph, Jr., and Titus.

Joseph, Jr. was elected Lieutenant and later Captain of the 8th Company in the 3rd Regiment of the Hampshire County, Massachusetts militia on 26 April 1776. Upon his death, one of his sons, Joseph III, received 112 acres of land.

Joseph III was the first to enter the financial industry, which is what the family is known for today. He left the family business of working on farms behind. In 1812, he joined the Washington Benevolent Society as a private banker. He moved the family to Hartford, which existed as one of the most prominent trade centers in the Connecticut River Valley. In November 1816, he purchased the Hartford Exchange Coffee House, where he acted as an innkeeper. It stood as the focal point of all business affairs and social activities in the area; the idea of meeting new clients and collaborating with other businessmen in these coffee shops and inns allowed for the growth of the industry in America. In July 1825, he bought the Hartford Bank. Joseph III purchased and reorganized the Hartford Fire Insurance Company into the Aetna Fire Insurance Company. (Many of these business deals were conducted at his inn, which acted as a hub for businessmen.) After a fire struck several New York City buildings, which held insurance plans from Aetna, Joseph Morgan III made prompt payments to the companies. New business suddenly poured in, as the insurance company was seen as highly reliable and trustworthy. The partners of the firm and the stockholders made large sums of money in future years. After moving from the farming business to the coffee house business, Joseph III decided it was time to turn to finance. He purchased the City Hotel on Main Street, which he renovated and cleaned up; business at the hotel boomed like never before. He married Sarah Morgan (née Spencer), who was the Director of the Hartford Orphan Asylum. He acted as a director of the firm until his death.

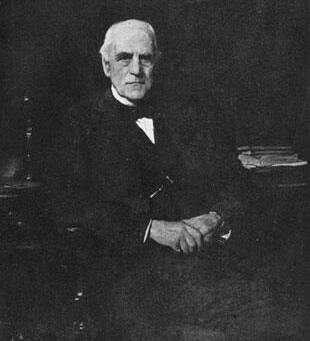
Junius Spencer Morgan, founder of the banking empire that became known as the House of Morgan.

Joseph III's son, Junius Spencer (J. S.) Morgan, played a prominent role in the banking industry. From a young age, he showed interest in entering the business field like his father. In 1829, at the age of 15, he worked as an apprentice with a merchant, Alfred Welles, in Boston. Following that, he worked at some firms including:

- Morgan, Ketchum, and Company of New York (1834–1836)
- Howe, Mather, and Company; later known as Mather, Morgan, and Company (1836–1851)
- J. M. Beebe, Morgan, and Company (1851–1854), Boston's largest mercantile bank at the time
- George Peabody and Company (1854–1864)

In 1864, Junius Morgan changed the name of George Peabody and Company to J. S. Morgan and Company. Under his leadership, it became one of the most prominent banking firms in both America and Europe. At the age of 64, J. S. Morgan retired.

Perhaps the most prominent member of the family was John Pierpont "J.P." Morgan (1837–1913), son of J. S. Morgan. He became exposed to his father's business deals at an early age. He worked as an accountant until eventually becoming a partner at Drexel, Morgan & Co. in 1871. By 1885, he began buying out railroads and reorganizing them. Through his business strategies, the term "Morganization" was coined to describe his method of creating monopolies through buying companies, eliminating competition, and cutting costs. By the turn of the century, he became incredibly successful in his business endeavors, controlling most of the major industries in America. During the Panic of 1907, J. Pierpont Morgan bailed out the U.S. government.

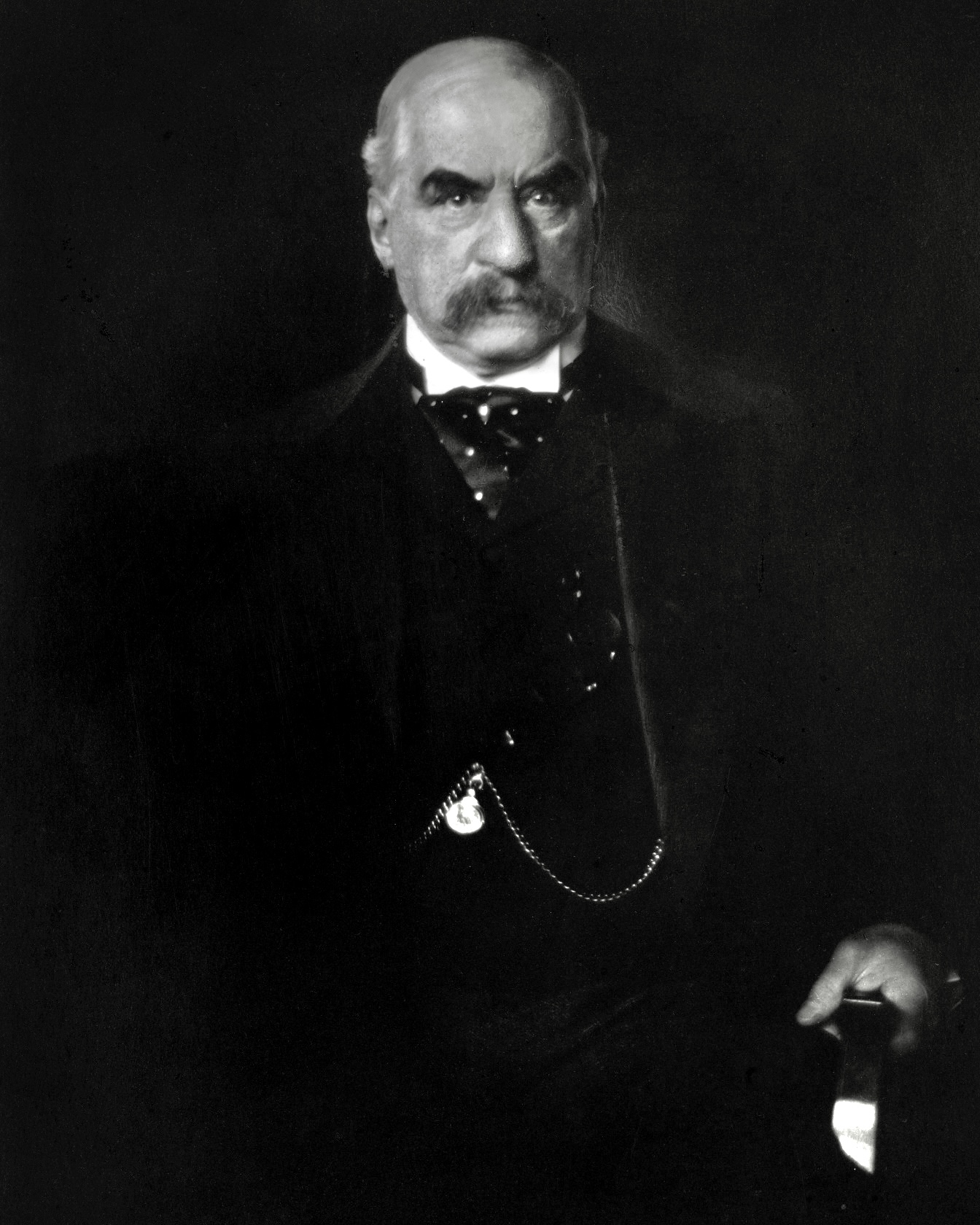
John Pierpont "J.P." Morgan, the globally renowned financier under whom the Morgan family reached the peak of its wealth and influence.

The key characteristic of the Morgan banking style, perpetuated by J. P. Morgan, existed where banks "perpetuate an ancient European tradition of wholesale banking, serving governments, large corporations, and rich individuals". The bankers of the pre-1913 Baronial Age were said to have been the "lords of creation", since they catapulted the American economy into an industrial powerhouse of production and power.

J.P. Morgan was also a member of numerous social clubs including the Union League, New York Yacht Club, and Knickerbocker Club. In 1891, he also founded his own club, the Metropolitan Club. Famous members included Cornelius Vanderbilt, Darius Ogden Mills, and more. The club had 1200 resident and 500 non-resident members at its founding. These social clubs were important in establishing relationships among powerful leaders of American society. Modeled after British social clubs, these organizations had people who held a tremendous influence over everyday life, such as bankers, politicians, lawyers, and railroad tycoons.

J. P. Morgan's legacy was continued by his son of the same name, although his son never became as prominent as his father. Born in 1867, John Pierpont Morgan, Jr. attended Harvard University, class of 1889. Also known as "Jack", he entered the banking industry, like his father, becoming a partner at Drexel, Morgan and Company, Bankers and Brokers of New York City in 1892. He helped in the establishment of J.P. Morgan and Company, which was founded in 1894. Yet, his leadership of the House of Morgan ultimately marked the beginning of the Morgan dynasty's decline.

With the passage of the Glass-Steagall Act in 1933, which restricted the merging of investment and commercial banks, came the end of the period of Robber barons and banking dominance. Thus, J. P. Morgan and Company became a commercial bank, and Morgan Stanley an investment bank. Through new legislation, and a growing public resentment against big business, the opportunities for Jack were rare compared to his predecessors. Additionally, Jack suffered from many ailments, such as neuritis, to the point where he had to resign from numerous positions.

The Morgan family are members of the Episcopal Church.

== Wealth ==
By one estimate, J. P. Morgan (1837–1913) is believed to have been the 24th richest American in history, inflation-adjusted. His fortune is believed to have grown to about $57 billion (2024 USD).

According to historians Michael M. Klepper and Robert E. Gunther, Morgan had one of the highest wealth:GNP ratios in American history. In their book, The Wealthy 100: From Benjamin Franklin to Bill Gates, Morgan's wealth:GNP ratio was 328. At the time, his fortune equaled around $119 billion.

== Genealogy ==
=== William Morgan Branch ===
- William Morgan
  - John Morgan (1605–1699)
  - James Morgan (1607–1685)
  - Miles Morgan (1616–1699) m. (1) Prudence Morgan (née Gilbert) m. (2) Elizabeth Morgan (née Bliss)
    - Mary Morgan (1644–1683) m. Edmund Primrides, then Nicholas Rust
    - Burt Jonathan Morgan (1646–1714) m. Sarah Morgan (née Cooley)
    - David Morgan (1648–1731) m. Mary Morgan (née Clark)
    - Pelatiah Morgan (1650–1675) m. Lydia Morgan (née unknown)
    - Isaac Morgan (1652–1706) m. Abigail Morgan (née Gardner)
    - Lydia Morgan (1654–1737) m. (1) Edmund Marshall m. (2) John Pierce
    - Hannah Morgan (1656–1697) m. Samuel Terry, II
    - Mercy Morgan (1658–1660)
    - Nathaniel Morgan (1671–1752) m. Hannah Morgan (née Bird)
      - Nathaniel Morgan (1692–1763)
      - Samuel Morgan (1694–1777) m. Rachel Morgan (née Smith)
      - Ebenezer Morgan (1696–1770) m. Abigail Morgan (née Ashley), then m. Lydia Morgan
      - Hannah Morgan (1698–1784) m. Joseph Kellogg
      - Miles Morgan (1700–1783) m. Lydia Morgan (née Day)
      - Joseph Morgan (1702–1786) m. Mary Morgan (née Stebbins)
        - Joseph Morgan, Jr. (1736–1813) m. Experience Morgan (née Smith)
          - Eurydice Morgan (b. 1765)
          - Huldah Morgan (1767–1770)
          - Huldah Morgan (b. 1770)
          - Nancy Morgan (1772–1835)
          - Achsah Morgan (1774–1868)
          - Elizabeth Morgan (1782–1850) married Thomas Snow (1778–1838)
          - Joseph Morgan III (1780–1847) m. Sarah Morgan (née Spencer)
            - Mary Morgan (1808–1897)
            - Lucy Morgan (1811–1890)
            - Junius Spencer Morgan (1813–1890) m. Juliet Pierpont (See Junius Spencer Morgan Branch Below)
          - Betsey Morgan (1782–1786)
        - Titus Morgan (1737–1739)
        - Titus Morgan (1740–1834) m. Sarah Morgan (née Morgan)
        - Lucas Morgan (b. 1742/3)
        - Elizabeth Morgan (1745–1782) m. Thomas White, Jr.
        - Judah Morgan (b. 1748/9) m. Elizabeth Shivoy
        - Jesse Morgan (b. 1748)
        - Hannah Morgan (b. 1751/2) m. John Legg
      - James Morgan (1705–1786) m. Mercy Morgan (née Bliss)
      - Isaac Morgan, II (c. 1707 – 1796) m. Ruth Morgan (née Alvord)
      - Elizabeth Morgan (1710–1745)

=== Junius Spencer Morgan Branch ===
- Junius Spencer (J. S.) Morgan (1813–1890) m. Juliet (Julia) Morgan (née Pierpont)
  - John Pierpont (J. P.) Morgan (1837–1913) m. (1) Amelia Sturges (1835–1862) m. (2) Frances Louisa Morgan (née Tracy)
    - Louisa Pierpont Morgan (1866–1946) m. Herbert "Penny" Livingston Satterlee
      - Eleanor Morgan Satterlee (1905–1951) m. 1929: Milo Sargent Gibbs (div. 1948)
        - Margaret Satterlee Teeter (1929-2015) m. William Edward "Ned" Herrmann
    - John Pierpont Morgan, Jr. (1867–1943) m. Jane Norton Morgan (née Grew)
      - Junius Spencer Morgan III (1892–1960) m. 1944: Louise Converse
        - John Pierpont Morgan II (1918–2004) m. Claire Byrd Ober (1922–2008)
          - Junius Spencer Morgan IV m. 1970: Patricia Adele Milton
          - John Pierpont Morgan III m. 1977: Bonnie Allis Barr
          - Linda Louise Morgan m. 1945: John Joseph Filz
          - Frederick C. Morgan
            - Samantha Morgan
              - John (Jack) Pierpont Morgan V(1964-2006) m. Donna Barbara dei Principi Massimo
                - Jimmy Spencer Morgan Massimo(Born in 1981)
                  - Andre Spencer Morgan Hamilton(Born in 2004)
                  - Miles Spencer Morgan Hamilton(Born in 2009)
                - Tracy Vittoria Morgan Massimo(Born in 1983)
                  - Sebastian George Perry Morgan(Born in 2003)
                  - Alexander Perry Morgan(Born in 2004)
                - Owen Arthur Morgan Massimo(Born in 1984)
                  - Elaira Sophie Morgan Adams(Born in 2005)
                  - Madison Grace Morgan Adams(Born in 2008)
        - Louise Morgan (1917–2006) m. Raymond Clark, then Charles R. Hook, Jr. (d. 1961)
          - Raymond Clark, Jr., Junius Clark, Jonathan Clark, Leah h. Hook
            - Oliver Lane Clark
        - Ann Morgan (1923–2019) m. 1957: Henry Simoneau
      - Jane Norton Morgan (1893–1981) m George Nichols (1878–1950)
        - Jane Norton Nichols (1918–1998) m. 1942 Walter H. Page II (1915–1999, son of Arthur W. Page)
      - Frances Tracy Morgan (1897–1989) m. 1917: Paul Geddes Pennoyer (1890–1970).
        - Paul Pennoyer Jr. (1920-2010) m. Elizabeth Cecily Henderson (1928-2021)
        - Robert Morgan Pennoyer (1925–2023) m. Victoria Parsons (1928–2013)
          - Tracy Pennoyer m. 1988: John Winthrop Auchincloss II (son of Louis Auchincloss)
          - Peter Pennoyer (b. 1957) m. 1988: Katherine Lee "Katie" Ridder (granddaughter of Bernard J. Ridder)
      - Henry Sturgis Morgan (1900–1982), co-founder of Morgan Stanley m. Catherine Morgan (née Adams)
        - Henry Sturgis Morgan Jr. (1924–2011) m. (1) 1945: Fanny Gray Little (div. 1972), m. (2) Jean Alexandra McCain, (daughter of John S. McCain, Jr.)
        - John Adams Morgan (1930–2025) m. (4) 2010 Connie Morgan (1) 1953: Elizabeth Robbins Choate (1933–1998) (div. 1957); m. (2) Tania Goss (div.1966) m. (3) 1998: Sonja Tremont (b. 1963) (div. 2006)
          - John Adams Morgan Jr (b. 1954)
          - Caroline E Philipson (b.2002)
          - Chauncey Goss Morgan (b.1964)
          - Quincy Adams Morgan (b.2000)
    - Juliet Pierpont Morgan (1870–1952) m. William Pierson Hamilton (1869–1950)
      - Helen Morgan Hamilton (1896–1985) ∞ (1) Arthur Hale Woods (1870–1942); ∞ (2) Warren Randolph Burgess (1889–1978)
        - John Pierpont Woods
        - Leonard Hamilton Woods
        - Alexander Hamilton Woods
        - Carolie Frances Woods
          - Tracy Hollingsworth
            - Zachary Hollingsworth Jones
            - Ashley New Jones
              - Alexandra Ann Bal
              - Charlotte Tracy Bal
              - Josephine Elizabeth Bal
              - James Valentine Bal
              - Catherine Winifred Bal
            - Schuyler Hamilton Jones
            - Owen Morgan Jones
    - Anne Tracy Morgan (1873–1952)
  - Sarah Spencer Morgan (1839–1896) m. George Hale Morgan (1840–1911)
    - Junius Spencer Morgan II (1867–1932) m. Josephine Adams Perry (1869–1963)
      - Sarah Spencer Morgan (1893–1949) m. Henry B. Gardner (1891–1932)
      - Alexander Perry Morgan (1900–1968) m. Janet Croll (1901–1985)
  - Mary Lyman Morgan (1844–1919) m. Walter Hayes Burns (1838–1897)
    - Mary Ethel Burns (d. 1961) m. Lewis Harcourt, 1st Viscount Harcourt (1863–1922)
      - Hon. Doris Mary Thérèse Harcourt (1900–1981) m. Alexander Baring, 6th Baron Ashburton (1898–1991)
        - John Francis Harcourt Baring, 7th Baron Ashburton (1928–2020) m. (1) Hon. Susan Mary Renwick (daughter of the 1st Baron Renwick) m. (2) Sarah Cornelia Spencer-Churchill (daughter of John Spencer-Churchill)
          - Hon. Lucinda Mary Louise Baring (b. 1956) m. Hon. Michael John Wilmont Malet Vaughan (son of the 8th Earl of Lisburne)
          - Mark Francis Robert Baring, 8th Baron Ashburton (b. 1958) m. Miranda Caroline Moncrieff
          - Hon. Rose Theresa Baring (b. 1961) m. Barnaby Hugh Rogerson (b. 1960)
          - Hon. Alexander Nicholas John Baring (b. 1964) m. Lucy Caroline Fraser
        - Hon. Robin Alexander Baring (b. 1931) m. Ann Caroline Thalia Gage (b. 1931)
          - Francesca Rhiannon Baring (b. 1963) m. Stuart Douglas
      - Hon. Olivia Vernon Harcourt (1902–1984) m. The Hon. John Mulholland (d. 1948) (son of the 2nd Baron Dunleath)
        - Mary Norah Mulholland (b. 1924) m. John William Owen Elliot-Murray-Kynynmound (1921–2005)
        - Martin Edward Harcourt Mulholland (1927–2003) m. Lilian Diana Tindall Lucas
        - Bridget Olivia Mulholland (b. 1930) m. Gerald Cecil Williams (1916–2005)
      - William Edward Harcourt, 2nd Viscount Harcourt (1908–1979) m. Hon. Maud Elizabeth Grosvenor (daughter of the 4th Baron Ebury)
        - Hon. Elizabeth Ann Harcourt (b. 1932) m. Crispin Gascoigne (1929–2001) (son of Julian Gascoigne)
        - Hon. Penelope Mary Harcourt (b. 1933) m. Anthony David Motion
        - Hon. Virginia Harcourt (b. 1937) m. Julian Francis Wells
      - Barbara Vernon Harcourt (1905–1961) m. (1) Robert Jenkinson (1900–1970) m. (2) William James Baird
    - Walter Spencer Morgan Burns (1872–1929) m. Ruth Evelyn Cavendish-Bentinck (1883–1978) (daughter of William George Cavendish-Bentinck)
      - Cynthia Mary Burns (d. 1977) m. Sir John Carew Pole, 12th Baronet (1902–1993)
        - Elizabeth Mary Carew Pole (1929–2021) m. David Cuthbert Tudway Quilter (1921–2007)
        - Caroline Anne Carew Pole (1933–2018) m. Hon. Paul Asquith (1927–1984) (son of the Baron Asquith)
        - Sir Richard Carew Pole, 13th Baronet (1938–2024) m. Mary Dawnay (b. 1936)
  - Junius Spencer Morgan, Jr. (1846–1858)
  - Juliet Pierpont Morgan (1847–1923)
    - John Junius Morgan (d. 1952)

== Network ==
=== Associates ===
The following is a list of figures closely aligned with or subordinate to the Morgan family.

- Robert Bacon
- George Fisher Baker
- Charles A. Coffin
- Edmund C. Converse
- Henry Pomeroy Davison
- Anne Murray Dike
- Anthony Joseph Drexel
- Thomas Edison
- Elbert Henry Gary
- Seymour Parker Gilbert
- Robert Gordon
- Belle da Costa Greene
- Edward Grenfell
- Henry Herman Harjes
- James J. Hill
- J. Bruce Ismay
- Thomas W. Lamont
- Charles D. Lanier
- Charles Sanger Mellen
- William Henry Moore
- Samuel Endicott Peabody
- George Walbridge Perkins
- Cecil Spring Rice
- Samuel Spencer
- Harold Stanley
- Charles Steele
- Francis Lynde Stetson
- Edward R. Stettinius
- Edward T. Stotesbury
- Myron Charles Taylor
- James Hood Wright

=== Businesses ===
The following is a list of companies in which the Morgan family held a controlling or otherwise significant interest.

- Aetna
- Alabama Great Southern Railroad
- American Bridge Company
- American Radiator Company
- AT&T Corporation
- Bankers Trust
- Boston and Providence Railroad
- Carolina & Northwestern Railway
- Central New England Railway
- Chesapeake & Ohio Railway
- Easton & Amboy Railroad
- Equitable Life Assurance Society of the U.S.
- First National Bank of Chicago
- General Electric
- General Motors
- Georgia Southern and Florida Railway
- Hocking Valley Railway
- International Harvester
- International Mercantile Marine Company
- Johns-Manville
- J.P. Morgan & Co.
- Kennecott Copper Corporation
- Lehigh Valley Railroad
- Monon Railroad
- Montgomery Ward
- Morgan, Grenfell & Co.
- Morgan, Harjes & Co.
- Morgan Stanley
- National Bank of Commerce in New York
- New Haven Railroad
- New York and New England Railroad
- Old Colony Railroad
- Reading Railroad
- Rutland Railroad
- Southern Central Railroad
- Southern Railway
- Standard Brands
- United Dry Goods
- U.S. Steel
- Western Union

=== Non-profit organizations & philanthropy ===
- American Academy in Rome
- American Committee for Devastated France
- American Museum of Natural History
- Church Club of New York
- Colony Club
- Groton School
- Lying-In Hospital
- Metropolitan Club
- Metropolitan Museum of Art—J.Pierpont Morgan Wing
- Morgan Library & Museum
- Provident Loan Society
- Society for the Prevention of Useless Giving

== See also ==
- List of banking families
- Mellon family
- Rockefeller family
- Ventfort Hall Mansion and Gilded Age Museum

== Select bibliography ==
- The House of Morgan: An American Banking Dynasty and the Rise of Modern Finance, by Ron Chernow
- Doughty, Geoffrey H. (2007). "New York, New Haven & Hartford Railroad (New Haven)". In Middleton, William D.; Smerk, George M.; Diehl, Roberta L. (eds.). Encyclopedia of North American Railroads. Bloomington, IN: Indiana University Press. pp. 742–745. ISBN 978-0-253-34916-3.
- Drury, George H. (2007). "Chicago, Indianapolis & Louisville Railway (Monon Railroad)". In Middleton, William D.; Smerk, George M.; Diehl, Roberta L. (eds.). Encyclopedia of North American Railroads. Bloomington, IN: Indiana University Press. pp. 222–223. ISBN 978-0-253-34916-3.
- Moody, John; Turner, George Kibbe (1911). "Masters of Capital in America, The Seven Men". McClure's Magazine. New York City, NY: S.S. McClure Company. pp. 418–428.
