= Lying-In Hospital (disambiguation) =

A Lying-In Hospital is a hospital specialized in caring for women during pregnancy and childbirth.

Lying-In Hospital may also refer to:

- Lying-In Hospital, New York, a former hospital in Manhattan
- General Lying-In Hospital, one of the first maternity hospitals in Great Britain
- Providence Lying-In Hospital, a historic hospital building in Providence, Rhode Island
- British Lying-In Hospital, a former maternity hospital established in London in 1749
