= Albert A. Pennoyer =

Albert Adams Pennoyer (August 13, 1848 – April 3, 1908) was an American merchant.

== Early life ==
Pennoyer was born on August 13, 1848 in Brooklyn, New York. He was the son of Richard Smith Pennoyer (1812–1879) and Julia Nash (née Adams) Pennoyer (1822–1909). His father was a partner in the firm of J.Q. Adams & Co., dealers in household-furnishings. A nephew of Sylvester Pennoyer, he was a descendant of Robert Pennoyer, who came to the United States from England in 1639 on the Hopewell.

He was educated in local public schools and at Brooklyn Polytechnic before beginning his career in New York City.

== Career ==
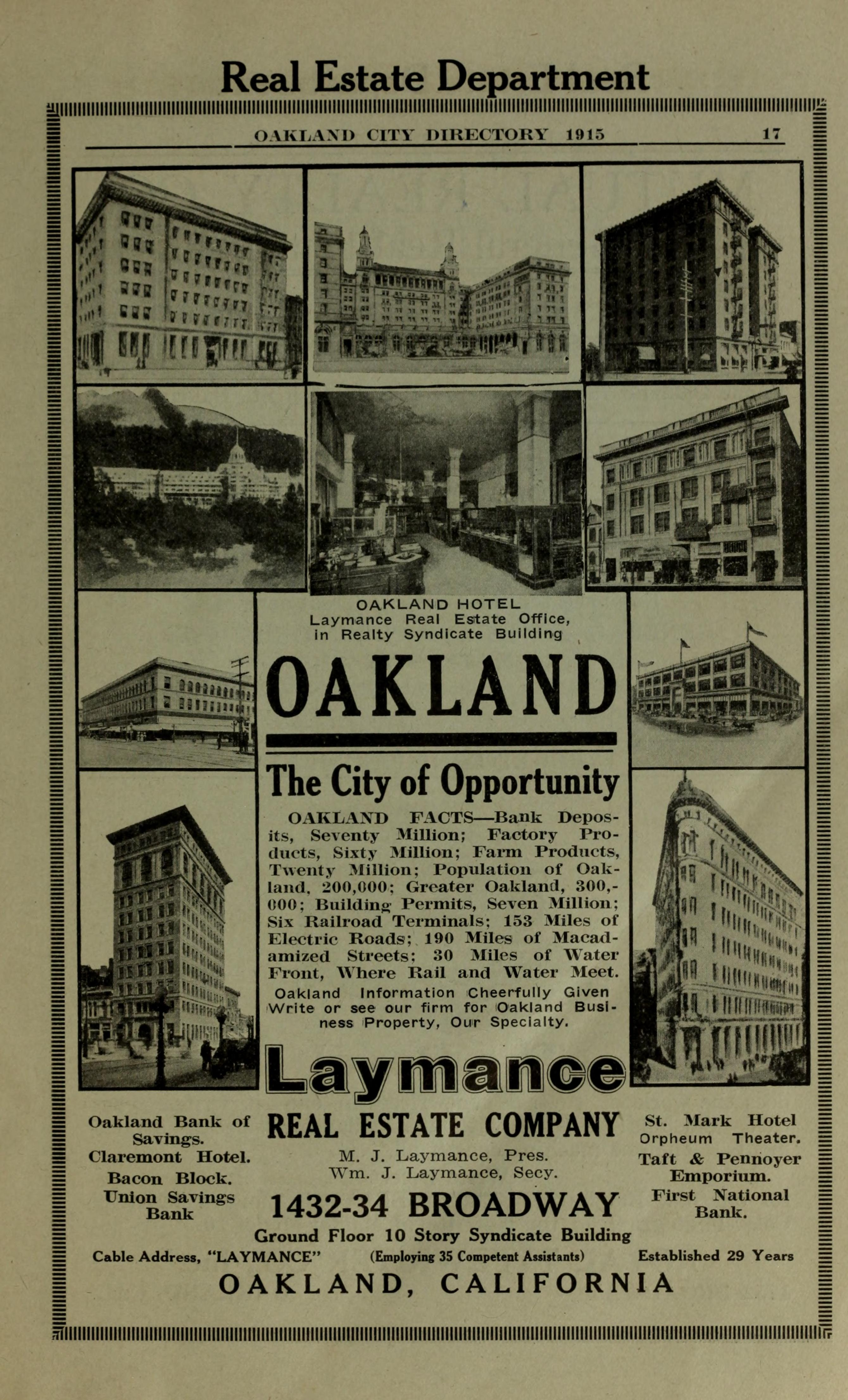
Polk-Husted Directory Co.'s Oakland, Berkeley and Alameda directory, 1911

In 1877, after visiting a cousin in Oakland, California, he moved to California and became a partner in the Taft & Pennoyer Department Store, which became the largest dry-goods store in Oakland. Pennoyer also invested in the Oakland Hotel.

== Personal life ==
In 1883, he married Virginia Vanderbilt Geddes Edmands (1859–1948), a daughter of Henry Day Geddes and Catherine Almira (née Kellogg) Geddes. She was raised in Newtown, Massachusetts, by her stepfather, Lt.-Colonel John Cushing Edmands, whose surname she later took. Together, they were the parents of:

- Richard Edmands Pennoyer (1885–1968), a diplomat who bought St Donat's Castle and married the Viscountess of Ingestre (née Lady Winifred Paget), the widow of Viscount of Ingestre and mother of John Chetwynd-Talbot, 21st Earl of Shrewsbury, in 1917. She was also the sister of Charles Paget, 6th Marquess of Anglesey.
- Albert Sheldon Pennoyer (1888–1957), an artist who was a member of the Monuments Men in World War II.
- Paul Geddes Pennoyer (1890–1971), who married Frances Morgan, a daughter of J.P. Morgan Jr.

Pennoyer died on April 3, 1908 in Berkeley, California. His widow died at her home in Litchfield, Connecticut in 1948.

=== Descendants ===
Through his son Paul, he was a grandfather of six, including Paul Pennoyer Jr. and Robert Morgan Pennoyer.
