= Paul Pennoyer =

Paul Pennoyer may refer to:

- Paul Pennoyer Jr. (1920–2010), American lawyer and Navy veteran who was awarded the Naval Cross.
- Paul Pennoyer Sr. (1890–1971), American lawyer, soldier, and statesman
