= Elmhurst, Providence, Rhode Island =

Neighborhood in Providence

Coordinates: 41.85°N 71.45°W

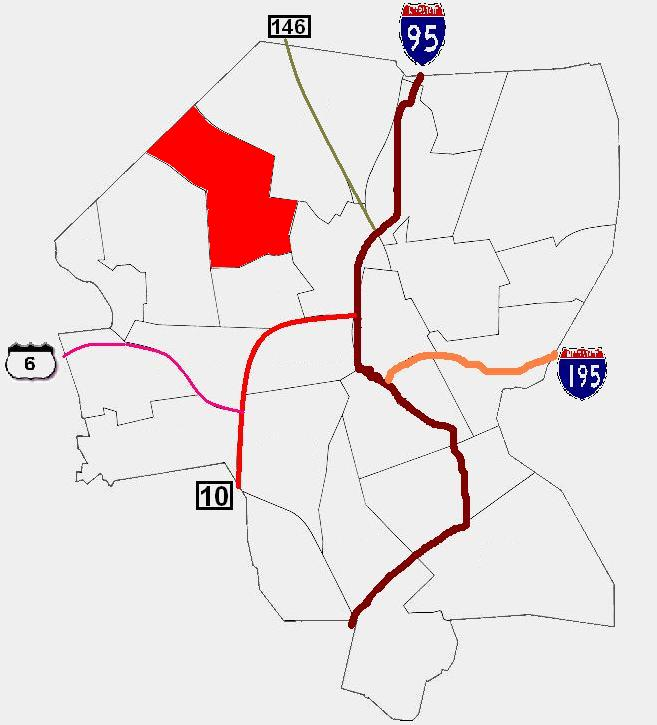
Providence neighborhoods with Elmhurst in red

Elmhurst views

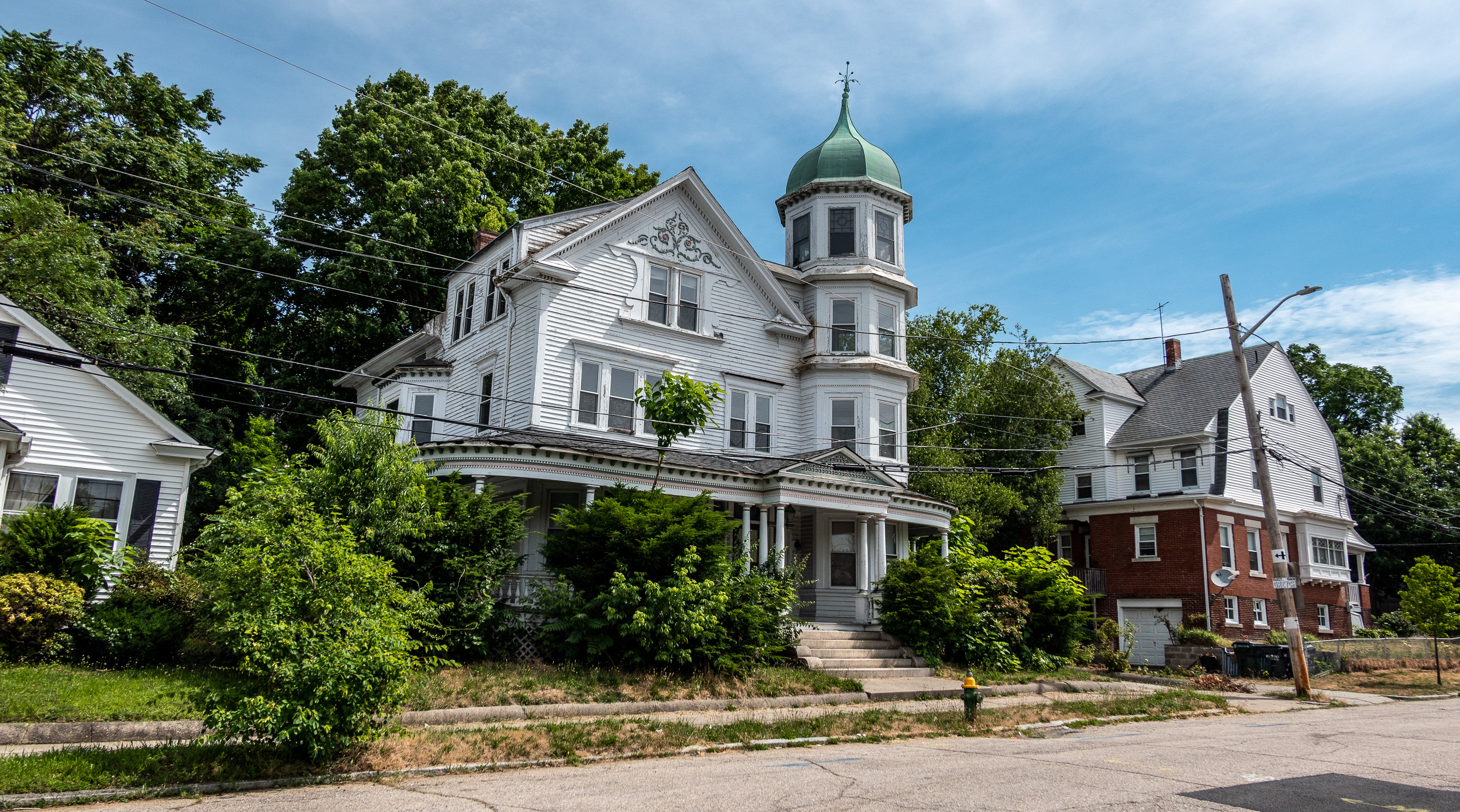
Historic homes on Higgins Avenue

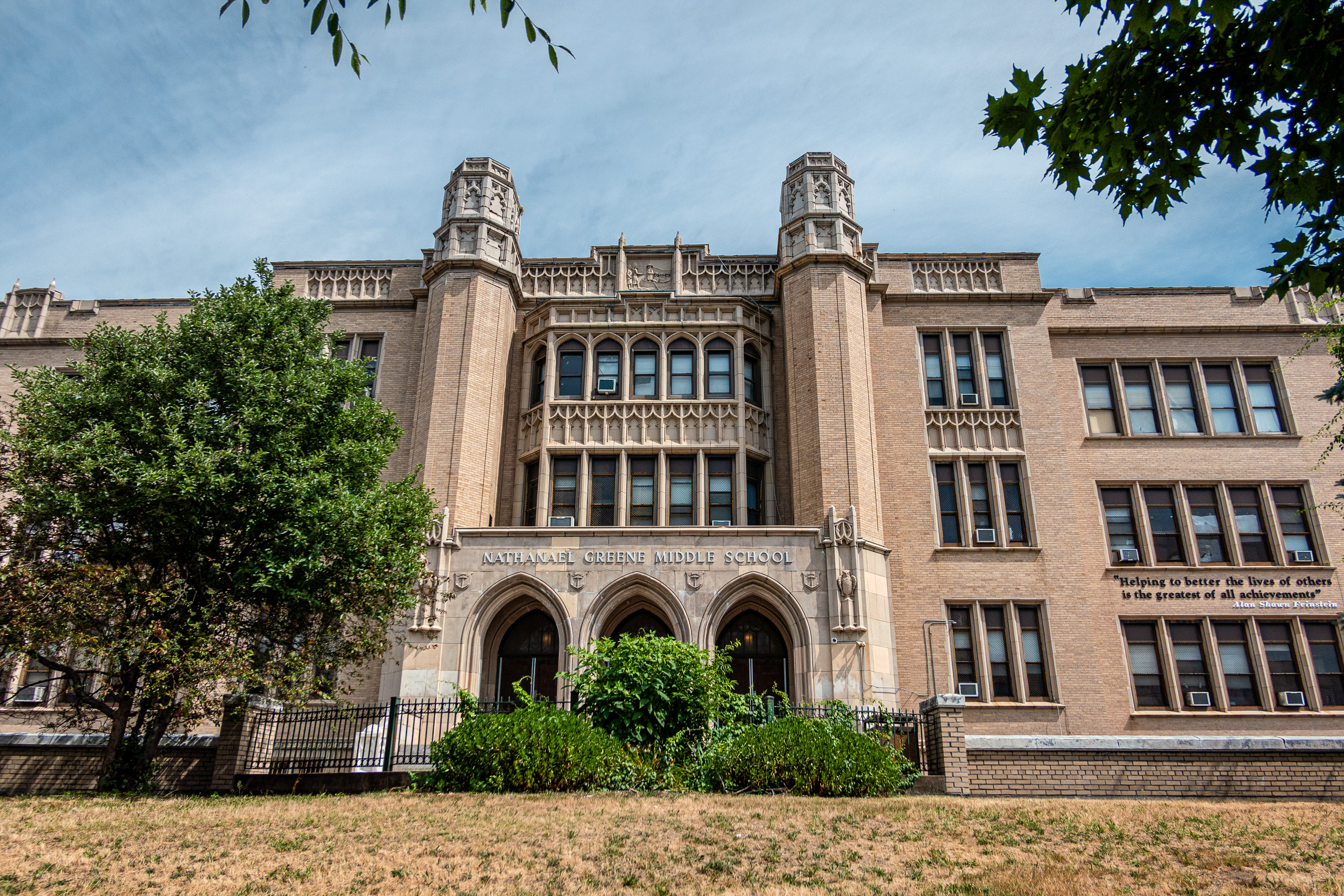
Nathanael Greene Middle School

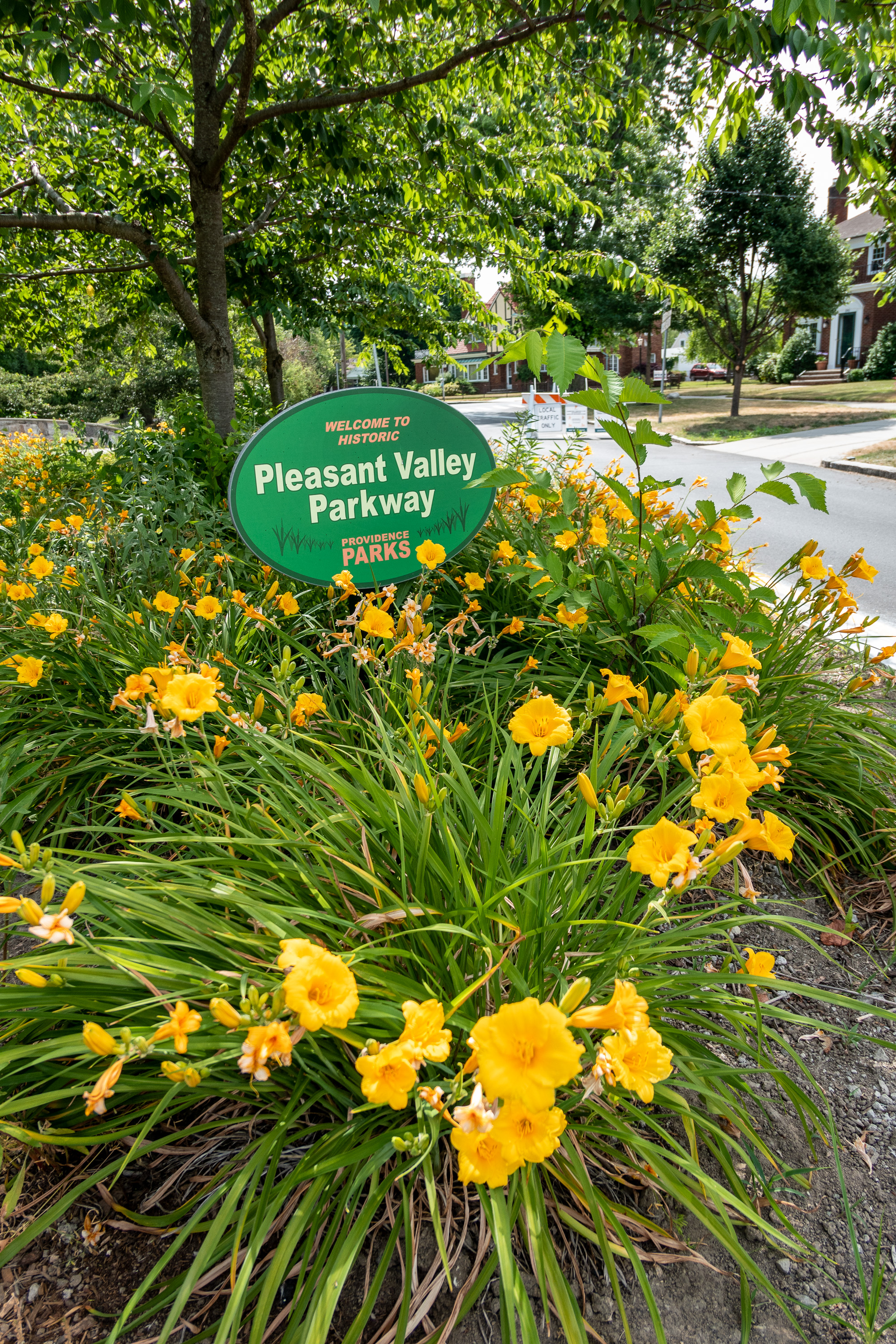
Pleasant Valley Parkway

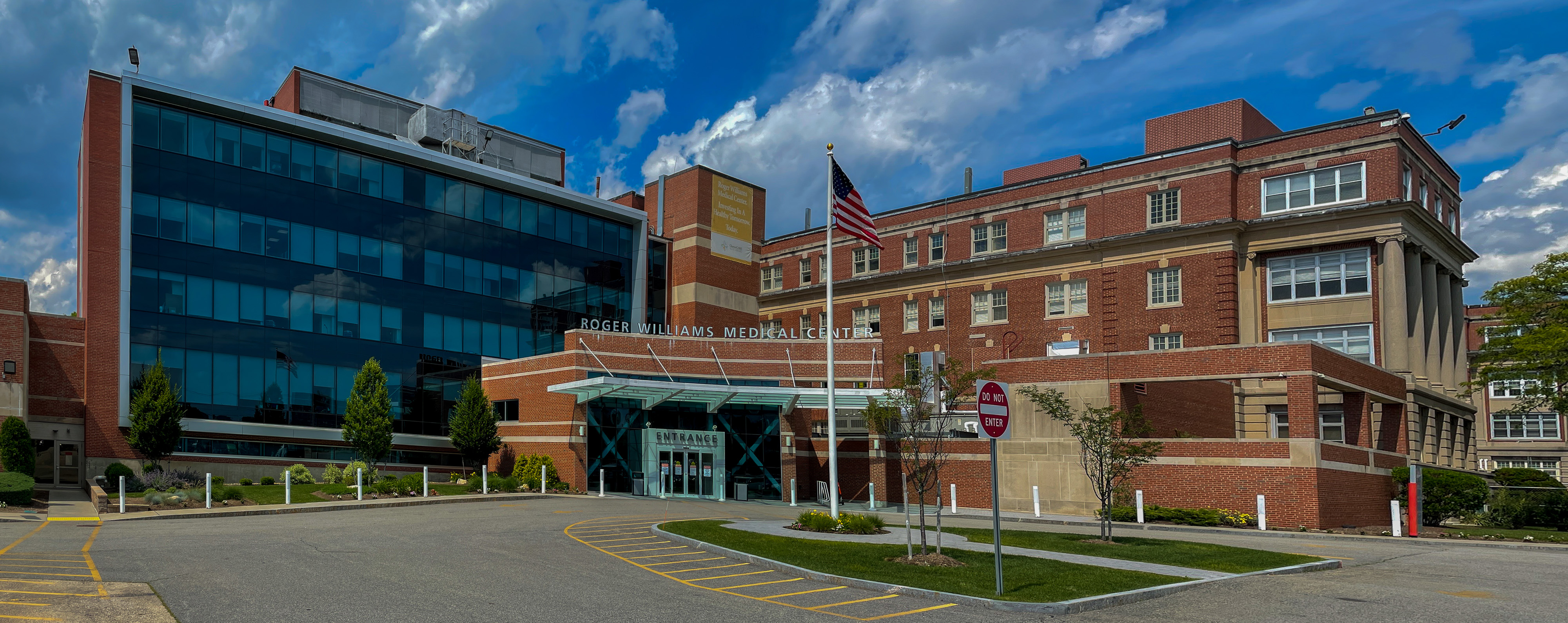
Roger Williams Medical Center

Elmhurst is a primarily residential neighborhood in the northwest quadrant of Providence, Rhode Island. Douglas Avenue and Admiral Street bound Elmhurst to the northeast, Academy Avenue and Smith Street bound it to the west, while Chalkstone Avenue marks the southern border.

== History ==
In the eighteenth and nineteenth centuries, Elmhurst was mostly large tracts of land used for farming. Streets constructed along present-day Douglas Ave, Eaton Street, and Chalkstone Avenue allowed for transit of produce to the city. The neighborhood remained sparsely settled for most of the nineteenth century. A streetcar line connecting Elmhurst to the city was opened in 1882. In 1909, the city acquired a piece of land on either side of a stream flowing from Academy Avenue, parallel to Chalkstone, and created Pleasant Valley Parkway, a landscaped boulevard similar in design to Blackstone Boulevard in the Blackstone neighborhood of Providence, though the residents attracted to the area were not as wealthy as their Blackstone counterparts.

In the early 1900s, Irish and Italian immigrants making their way out of crowded closer neighborhoods displaced the initial middle and upperclass residents. Institutional growth came over the next few decades in the form of the founding of the Charles V. Chapin Hospital, the Providence Lying-In Hospital (which once was Women and Infants Hospital before it moved to the South Side of Providence and is now Elmhurst Nursing Home) – the first Women's Maternity Services facility in the region, and the Homeopathic Hospital of Rhode Island (now Roger Williams Medical Center). Providence College and La Salle Academy moved to the area in 1917 and 1925 respectively.

Nathanael Greene Middle School, a yellow brick Tudor Gothic style public school, was built in 1929 on Chalkstone Avenue.

Following World War II, Elmhurst saw growth of a suburban character as it was one of the few areas in Providence with undeveloped land. Most of these houses were built in the northwestern part of the neighborhood.

== Demographics ==
For census purposes, the Census Bureau classifies Elmhurst as part of the Census Tract 24. This neighborhood had 8,834 inhabitants based on data from the 2020 United States Census.

The racial makeup of the neighborhood was 62.3% (5,504) White (Non-Hispanic), 6.5% (571) Black (Non-Hispanic), 5.2% (459) Asian, 4.5% (394) from some other race or from two or more races. Hispanic or Latino of any race were 21.6% (1,906) of the population. 13.2% are foreign born, with most foreign born residents originating from Asia (32%) and Central America (31%).

The median age in this area is 23.1 years old. Family Households made up 75% of the population, and the average household (family and non-family) had 2.5 persons living there. 22% of the population was married. Out of the 2,532 vacant and non-vacant housing units, 64% were owner occupied, and 36% renter occupied. The average house was worth $328,400, which is close the average in Providence. 18.8% of residents are below the poverty line.
