= Jane Norton Grew =

American socialite (1868–1925)

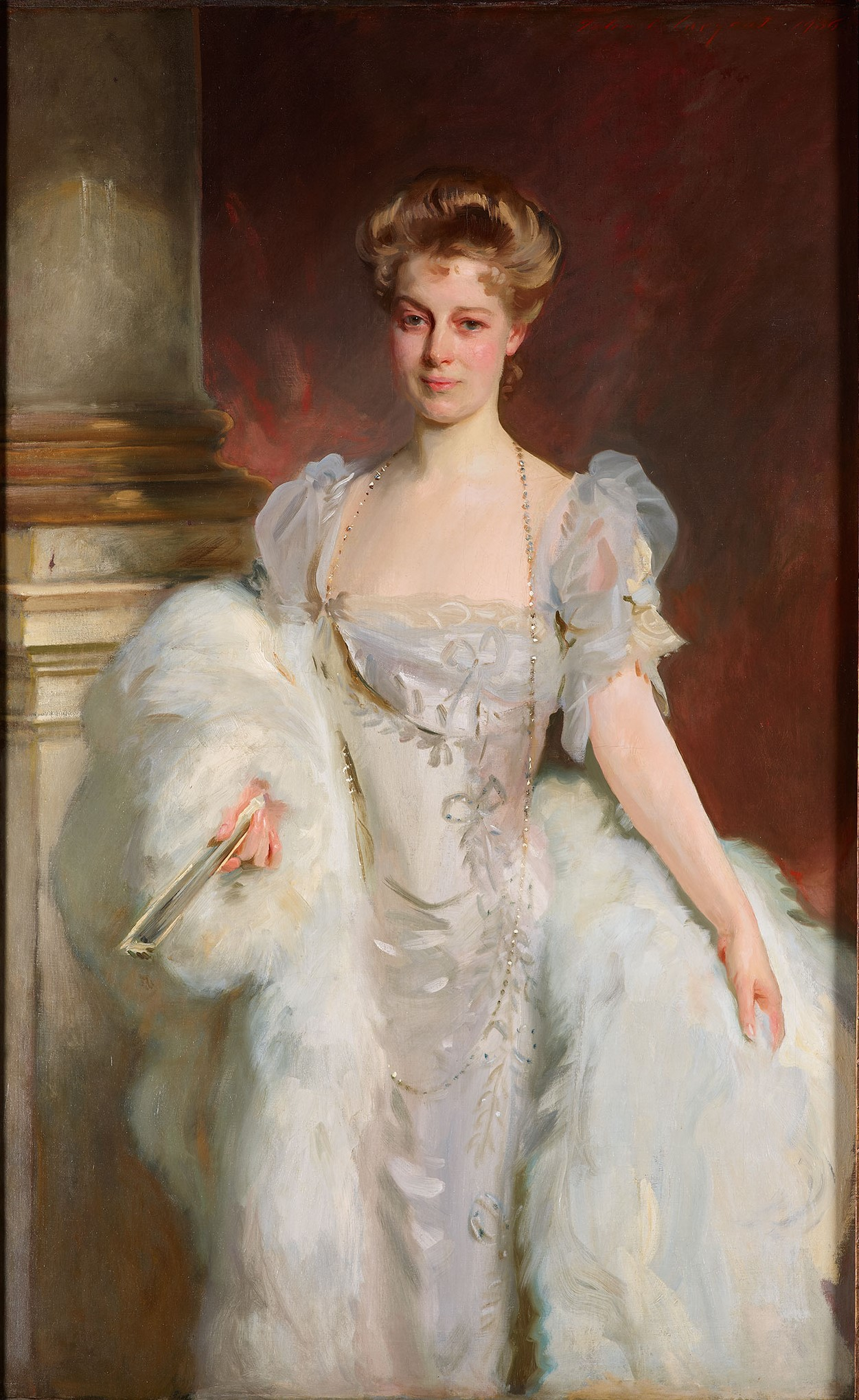
- 1906 portrait by John Singer Sargent
- Born: September 30, 1868; Boston, Massachusetts, U.S.
- Died: August 14, 1925 (aged 56); Hartford County, Connecticut, U.S.
- Resting place: Cedar Hill Cemetery
- Occupations: socialite, art collector, horticulturalist
- Spouse: J. P. Morgan Jr. (m. 1890)
- Children: 4 (including Junius Spencer Morgan III and Henry Sturgis Morgan)
- Parent(s): Henry Sturgis Grew; Jane Norton Wigglesworth
- Relatives: Henry Grew Crosby (nephew)
- Family: Morgan family (by marriage)

Jane Norton Grew (September 30, 1868 – August 14, 1925), known upon her marriage as Mrs. J. P. Morgan Jr., was an American socialite, art collector, and dilettante horticulturalist. Born in Boston to an affluent family, she married J. P. Morgan Jr., son of American financier J. P. Morgan, in 1890 and became prominent in both London and New York society, playing host to royalty including The Duke of Connaught and Strathearn. Grew curated and managed the Morgan library and art collection, and became involved in horticulture on her Long Island estate in Glen Cove.

== Early life and family ==
Jane Norton Grew was born in Boston on September 30, 1868. She was the daughter of Henry Sturgis Grew, a prominent Boston banker and mill owner, and Jane Norton Wigglesworth. She grew up at her family home on Beacon Street.

== Adult life ==
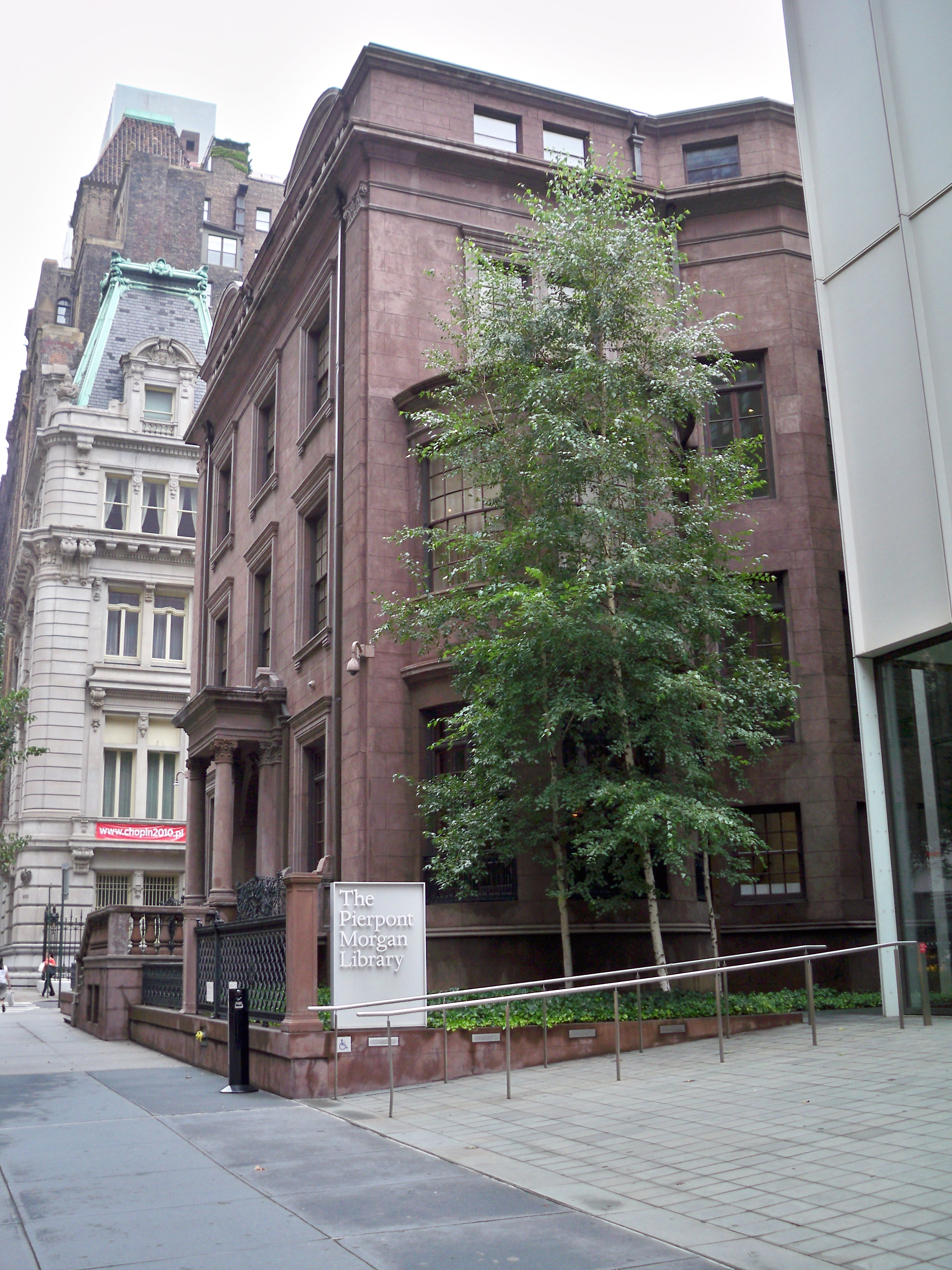
The Morgans' brownstone, now part of the Morgan Library & Museum.

On December 11 1890, Grew married John Pierpont Morgan Jr., the son and heir of the financier and banker J. P. Morgan. The ceremony took place at Arlington Street Church in Boston.

The couple raised four children:

- Junius Spencer Morgan III (1892–1960), who married Louise Converse (1895–1974), daughter of Frederick Shepherd Converse, in 1915.
- Jane Norton Morgan Nichols (1893–1981), who married George Nichols (1878–1950).
- Frances Tracy Pennoyer (1897–1989), who married Paul Geddes Pennoyer (1890–1970), a lawyer, in 1917.
- Henry Sturgis Morgan (1900–1982), a founding partner of Morgan Stanley who married Catherine Lovering Adams (1902–1988), daughter of Charles Francis Adams III, descendants of the 2nd U.S. President, John Adams.

In 1898, the family moved to London, where Grew was presented to Queen Victoria. During their time in the United Kingdom, she sat for the portraitist John Singer Sargent between 1904 and 1905, having a portrait completed in 1906 after sitting for him thirteen times. She wrote in her scrapbook about the experience, saying "[Sargent] thinks it is the best work he has done this year. He arranged a mirror so that I could watch him paint. It was thrilling to see him work."

The family later returned to New York in 1905, residing at Glen Cove on Long Island, where Grew took interest in horticulture on the Morgan's estate. They also owned a brownstone in New York City located at 229 Madison Avenue, where they commissioned a major renovation. Grew managed and curated the family's collection of books, manuscripts, and works of art. After the death of her father-in-law in 1913, Morgan continued to employ Belle da Costa Greene as the Morgan's librarian, expanding the collection with items in which she and her husband were personally interested.

In 1912, she and her in-laws co-hosted Prince Arthur, Duke of Connaught and Strathearn, Princess Louise Margaret, Duchess of Connaught and Strathearn, and Princess Patricia of Connaught and showed them the Morgan library and galleries.

== Death ==
Grew died of encephalitis lethargica in 1925. At the time, doctors attributed her encephalitis to having contracted influenza during the 1918 pandemic.
