= Lying-In Hospital, New York =

Defunct Manhattan hospital

Lying-In Hospital

Geography
- Location: Manhattan, New York, United States
- Coordinates: 40.7347°N 73.9835°W

Organization
- Type: Specialist

Services
- Speciality: Maternity hospital

History
- Opened: 1799
- Closed: 1932 (merged with New York Hospital)

Links
- Lists: Hospitals in New York State

Lying-In Hospital was a maternity hospital in Manhattan. Chartered in 1799, it was given a strong boost in 1897 with "the magnificent gift of $1,000,000" from J. Pierpont Morgan.

It relocated more than once, both before and after Morgan's donation. Their focus was expectant women. Lying-In Hospital merged in 1932 with New York Hospital, and the original name (which refers to the term "lying-in") was dropped.

Their "Second Avenue, between 17th and 18th Streets" location "was redeveloped as an apartment building in the 1980s."

== History ==
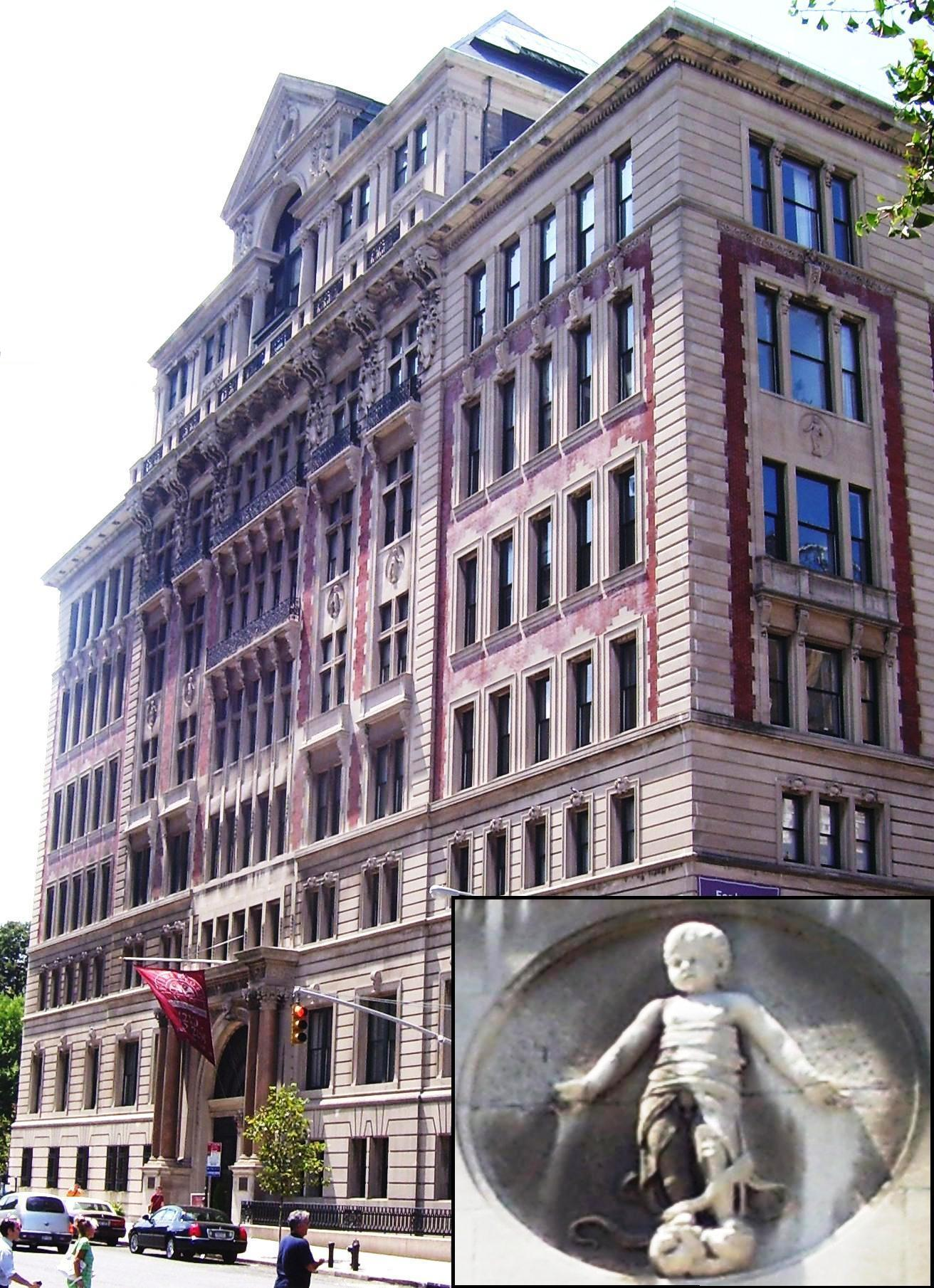
305 Second Avenue building: used by Lying-In Hospital prior to their merger with New York Hospital

The term Lying-in Hospital pre-existed the one described by The New York Times in their 1865 Death at a private lying-in hospital about a specific impoverished woman's 8th abortion, following which she died. There were other such deaths and facilities, including in other cities.

The best known of these lying-in hospitals, due to extensive documentation, affiliated with New York Hospital in 1799, and ended this initial arrangement in 1827. Other sources and other personnel, in particular two doctors and the father of one of them, reactivated the dormant Society of the Lying-In Hospital of the City of New York and, with funding from J. P. Morgan (and later from Morgan's son) acquired a building and in 1932 "became the Obstetrics and Gynecology Department of New York Hospital, occupying one of the pavilions along the East River."

It served primarily as a maternity hospital and was "said to account for 60 percent of all births in Manhattan." Some of their staff did medical research.

For some of their pre-affiliation years they used the name New York Lying-In Hospital.

== Others ==
In addition to the Lying-In Hospital affiliated with New York Hospital there were others, such as "a small lying-in hospital in the vicinity of Bellevue Hospital." Fundraising for these hospitals was covered by The New York Times.

== See also ==
- General Lying-In Hospital
- Providence Lying-In Hospital
