= Peter Pennoyer =

American architect

- Born: Peter Morgan Pennoyer; February 19, 1957 (age 69); New York City, U.S.
- Education: St. Bernard's School; St. Paul's School; Columbia College; Columbia Graduate School of Architecture, Planning and Preservation
- Occupation: Architect
- Spouse: Katie Ridder (m. 1988)
- Parent: Robert Morgan Pennoyer
- Website: www.ppapc.com

Peter Morgan Pennoyer FAIA (born on February 19, 1957) is an American architect and the principal of Peter Pennoyer Architects, an architecture firm based in New York City and with an office in Miami. Pennoyer, his four partners and his forty associates have an international practice in traditional and classical architecture, or New Classical Architecture. Many of the firm's institutional and commercial projects involve historic buildings, and the Institute of Classical Architecture & Art has stated that the firm's strength is in "deftly fusing history and creative invention into timeless contemporary designs."

The firm's projects have been featured in publications such as The New York Times, Architectural Digest, The Wall Street Journal, Elle Decor,House & Garden and Galerie Magazine.

In October 2010, the Vendome Press published Peter Pennoyer Architects: Apartments, Townhouses, Country Houses, which featured twenty of the firm's projects, and in 2016, Vendome published A House in the Country, which chronicled the process used by Pennoyer and his wife, interior designer Katie Ridder, to design their own house and garden in Millbrook, New York. In 2021, the Vendome Press published Rowdy Meadow: House, Land, Art, which focuses on a new Czech-cubist-inspired house set in an extensive sculpture park in Ohio, and in 2023, the Vendome Press published Peter Pennoyer Architects: City, Country, which illustrates the firm's latest apartments, townhouses, and country houses, with interiors by leading designers.

== Early life and education ==
Peter Pennoyer was born on February 19, 1957, in New York City, the son of Victoria (née Parsons) Pennoyer (1928–2013), and Robert Morgan Pennoyer (1925–2023). His father was a partner at Patterson Belknap, a former Assistant U.S. Attorney for the Southern District of New York, and a former Assistant to the Assistant Secretary of Defense for International Security Affairs. Pennoyer graduated from St. Bernard's School in New York City and St. Paul's School in Concord, New Hampshire, received a Bachelor of Architecture degree from Columbia College in 1981, and a Masters of Architecture degree from Columbia Graduate School of Architecture, Planning and Preservation in 1984. He is the youngest of four and his older siblings are Russell Pennoyer, Christina Lee Pennoyer, and Dr. Tracy Pennoyer (the wife of John Auchincloss, a son of author Louis Auchincloss).

Pennoyer is the grandson of Frances (née Morgan) Pennoyer, and the lawyer Paul Geddes Pennoyer; a great-grandson of J.P. Morgan Jr.; and a great-great-grandson of J.P. Morgan. Pennoyer's maternal grandfather, James R. Parsons, was a partner in Chubb & Son, and his great-grandfather Hendon Chubb was a founding partner of Chubb & Son. His uncle was U.S. Naval Cross winner and lawyer, Paul Pennoyer Jr.

== Career ==
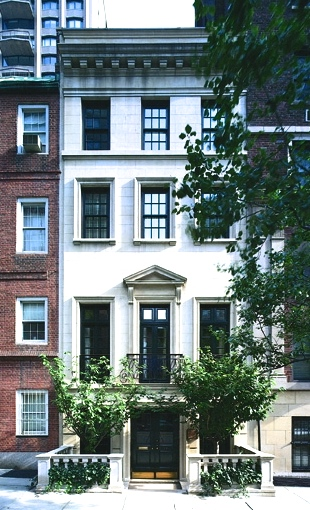
Townhouse on New York's Upper East Side.

While in graduate school from 1981 to 1983, Pennoyer worked as a designer in the Manhattan office of his Columbia professor, Robert A. M. Stern. He established his own practice in 1984, where he was a principal in the firm Pennoyer Turino Architects P. C. until 1990, after which he formed Peter Pennoyer Architects. One of his earliest projects was a retreat in the Catskill Mountains for his sister's father-in-law, Louis Auchincloss.

Pennoyer is a trustee of The Morgan Library & Museum, and president of the Whiting Foundation, which sponsors the Whiting Awards, a literary awards program. He is a National Peer Reviewer of the U.S. General Services Administration, Washington D.C., and a lifetime member of the Society of Architectural Historians. He was chairman of the board of The Institute of Classical Architecture & Art from 2009 to 2013.

From 2011 to 2018, Pennoyer was an adjunct professor in the Department of Art History: Department of Urban Design and Architecture Studies at New York University.

=== Published works ===
Pennoyer and historian Anne Walker have co-authored five monographs of American architectural history: The Architecture of Delano & Aldrich; The Architecture of Warren & Wetmore; The Architecture of Grosvenor Atterbury; New York Transformed: The Architecture of Cross & Cross; and Harrie T. Lindeberg and the American Country House. He and Walker also wrote the introduction to a reprint of Frank M. Snyder's Building Details.

=== Recognition ===
The Institute for Classical Architecture & Art (ICAA) gave Pennoyer's firm its Stanford White Award for the design of a house in Dutchess County, New York (2012), its Stanford White Award, for the design of a new apartment building on Manhattan's Upper East Side and for a new house in Maine (2016), its Bulfinch Award (to Preserve and Advance the Classical Tradition in New England) for its design of a new classical house in Massachusetts (2017).

In 2017, the College of Charleston awarded Pennoyer its Albert Simons Medal of Excellence. In 2017, the Institute of Classical Architecture & Art gave the firm the Arthur Ross Award for architecture. Peter Pennoyer received the Pillar of New York Award from the Preservation League of New York State in 2019. In 2024, The University of Notre Dame honored Pennoyer with the Richard R. Driehaus Prize, an annual award established in 2003 celebrating “a living architect whose work embodies the highest ideals of traditional and classical architecture in contemporary society, and creates a positive cultural, environmental, and artistic impact.”

Peter Pennoyer Architects has been on Architectural Digest's AD100 List, a listing of outstanding talent in architecture and interior design since 2012. The firm is included in New York Spaces Top 50 Designers List, and in Ocean Home magazine's Top 50 Coastal Architects list.

Pennoyer was elected to the College of Fellows of the American Institute of Architects in 2014, and to the General Society of Mechanics and Tradesmen in 2016.

=== Representative projects ===
Peter Pennoyer Architects' projects include the following:

- Wolong Bay Development, Dalian, China
- 151 East 78th Street, New York City
- Classical Villas, The Peak, Hong Kong
- The Metropolitan Opera Club, New York City
- New York Genealogical and Biographical Society, New York City
- The New York Stock Exchange Luncheon Club, New York City
- Proposal for the Redevelopment of Hudson Rail Yards
- Historic Hudson Valley, Pocantico Hills, New York
- David Webb, New York City Flagship Store
- The Mark Hotel, New York City
- Hodsoll Mckenzie, London
- Pop Shop, Keith Haring, New York City
- The Factory, Andy Warhol
- The Hotchkiss School, Paul Nitze Center for Global Understanding and Independent Thinking, Connecticut
- Oakley Farm, Virginia
- Diamond A Ranch, New Mexico
- Counter Proposal for the New York Public Library
- Moynihan Train Hall Clock
- The Benson, 1045 Madison Avenue, New York City
- Guild Hall of East Hampton

== Personal life ==
In 1988, Pennoyer married Katherine Lee "Katie" Ridder, the daughter of Constance Ridder, a lawyer, and Paul Anthony Ridder, a director of Knight Ridder, and the granddaughter of Bernard Ridder, the former chairman of Knight Ridder. They have three children: Jane, Anthony, and Virginia, and reside in New York City on the Upper East Side of Manhattan.
