= Anne Walker (architectural historian) =

American art historian

Anne Walker (born May 21, 1973, New York City) is an architectural historian and author in New York City.

She graduated from the Chapin School, from Middlebury College, and received a master's degree in Historic Preservation from Columbia University. In 2000, she joined Peter Pennoyer Architects in New York City, where she has collaborated with Peter Pennoyer on several books regarding the history of twentieth-century American architecture.

Walker serves as a Fellow Emeritus of the Institute of Classical Architecture and Art.

== Books ==
- Peter Pennoyer Architects: Apartments, Townhouses, Country Houses, The Vendome Press, 2010.
- The Finest Rooms in America, Rizzoli, 2010, with Thomas Jayne.
- The Ford Plantation Architectural Pattern Book, 1999, co-author, with Donald M. Rattner.
- The Architecture of Delano & Aldrich, W. W. Norton, 2003, co-author, with Peter Pennoyer.
- The Architecture of Warren & Wetmore, W. W. Norton, 2006, co-author, with Peter Pennoyer.
- Frank M. Snyder’s Building Details, W. W. Norton, 2007, co-author, with Peter Pennoyer, of an introduction.
- The Architecture of Grosvenor Atterbury, W. W. Norton, 2009, co-author, with Peter Pennoyer.

== Awards ==
- Winner, Victorian Society in America's Metropolitan Chapter Annual Publication Award, 2010.
- Winner, Victorian Society in America's Metropolitan Chapter Annual Publication Award, 2007.
- Honorable Mention, American Society of Interior Designers Educational Foundation/Joel Polsky Prize, 2003.
