= Society for the Lying-In Hospital =

- U.S. National Register of Historic Places
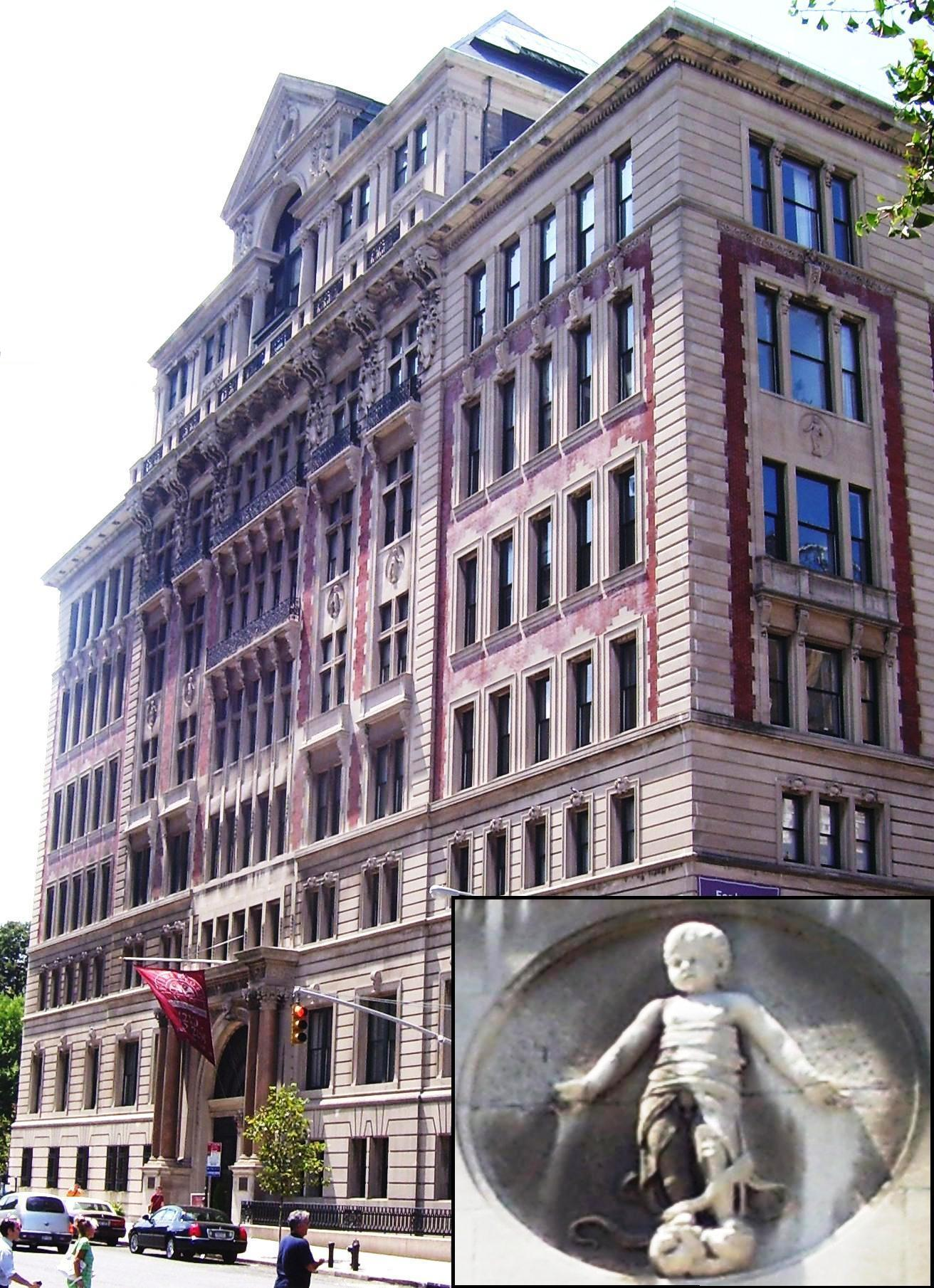
- The building with a detail of a swaddled baby from the facade (2010)

- Location within New York City Location within New York Location within the United States
- Location: 305 2nd Avenue; Manhattan, New York City
- Coordinates: 40°44′5″N 73°59′1″W
- Built: 1902
- Architect: R. H. Robertson
- Architectural style: Renaissance Revival
- NRHP reference No.: 83001746
- Added to NRHP: September 1, 1983

The Society for the Lying-In Hospital was a maternity hospital situated at 305 Second Avenue between East 17th and 18th Streets in the Stuyvesant Square neighborhood of Manhattan, New York City, United States. Now known as Rutherford Place, the building was added to the National Register of Historic Places in 1983. Lying-in is an archaic term for childbirth (referring to the month-long bed rest prescribed for postpartum confinement).

It was built in 1902 and designed by architect R. H. Robertson in the Renaissance Revival style, with a Palladian crown at the top. Swaddled babies decorate the windows of the 5th floor and the spandrels of the building, which was converted to offices and apartments in 1985 by Beyer Blinder Belle.

As the years passed, John Pierpont Morgan Jr. was concerned about the long-term stability of the hospital his father had so generously provided for. He recruited John D. Rockefeller Jr.; George F. Baker, Sr.; and George F. Baker Jr. to join forces in establishing an association with New York Hospital. Upon the subsequent opening of the New York Hospital-Cornell Medical Center in 1932, the Lying-In Hospital moved out of the Second Avenue building. It became the more modern-sounding Obstetrics and Gynecology Department of New York Hospital, which is still part of New York–Presbyterian Hospital.

This hospital was "said to account for 60 percent of all births in Manhattan." Some of their staff did medical research.

== See also ==
- National Register of Historic Places listings in Manhattan from 14th to 59th Streets
