= Robert Morgan Pennoyer =

American lawyer and author (1925–2023)

- Born: Robert Morgan Pennoyer; April 9, 1925; New York City, New York
- Died: August 13, 2023 (aged 98); South Dartmouth, Massachusetts
- Education: Harvard University (A.B.); Columbia Law School (LL.B.)
- Spouse: Victoria Parsons (m. 1948; died 2013)
- Children: 4, including Peter
- Parent(s): Frances Tracy Morgan; Paul Geddes Pennoyer
- Relatives: J. P. Morgan Jr. (grandfather), Paul Pennoyer Jr. (brother), Albert Pennoyer (uncle)

Robert Morgan Pennoyer (April 9, 1925 – August 13, 2023) was an American lawyer and author who was a member of the Morgan family.

== Early life ==
Pennoyer was born on April 9, 1925 at his grandfather's home on Madison Avenue. He was the son of Frances Tracy (née Morgan) Pennoyer (1897–1989) and Paul Geddes Pennoyer (1890–1970), a prominent lawyer who headed up the White & Case office in Paris. The family lived in an English-Norman styled home on an estate called "Round Bush" in Locust Valley, New York.

His maternal grandparents were John Pierpont Morgan, Jr. and Jane Norton Morgan. Among his extended family was uncle Junius Spencer Morgan III. Through another uncle, Henry Sturgis Morgan, co-founder of Morgan Stanley (who married Adams family descendant Catherine Adams), he was a first cousin of Henry Sturgis Morgan Jr. and John Adams Morgan. On his paternal side, his great, great uncle was Sylvester Pennoyer, the 8th governor of Oregon and of note for the seminal U.S. Supreme Court case, Pennoyer v. Neff.

Pennoyer was educated at a boarding school in Switzerland and St. Paul's School in New Hampshire before attending Harvard College. After returning from World War II, he attended Columbia Law School on the G.I. Bill, alongside Harold R. Tyler Jr., and Robert P. Patterson Jr., graduating in 1950.

== Career ==
After the attack on Pearl Harbor, he finished his education at Harvard in eighteen months so he could join the U.S. Navy at the age of 19. He served aboard the USS Pensacola, seeing action in the Pacific theater, where the Pensacola was involved in the Battle of Iwo Jima and was extensively damaged by enemy fire. "At the end of the war, he was part of a unit that helped occupy Japan’s northern island of Hokkaido and was the first American to set foot on the island."

After law school, he served as assistant U.S. attorney for the Southern District of New York under J. Edward Lumbard with Tyler and Patterson. From 1954 to 1958, he served in the Office of the Secretary of Defense, as assistant to the general counsel and as special assistant to the assistant secretary of defense for international security affairs. While there, he defended the U.S. Army during the Army–McCarthy hearings.

Pennoyer joined Patterson Belknap as an associate in 1958. He became a partner 1962, becoming chairman, and practiced law there until his retirement in 1995.

At age 90, he wrote his memoir entitled As It Was.

=== Philanthropy and volunteer work ===
Pennoyer was a founder of Exodus House, a "halfway house for addiction rehabilitation in East Harlem" for which he was also a trustee. In addition, he supported Human Rights First (formerly known as the Lawyers Committee for International Human Rights), where he established the Pennoyer Fellowship Program. He was also a supporter of women's rights and a champion of the Alliance for Justice, a progressive judicial advocacy group.

== Personal life ==
In 1948, Pennoyer was married to Victoria Parsons (1928–2013), a daughter of James Russell Parsons of West Orange, NJ, a partner in Chubb & Son, and granddaughter of Hendon Chubb, founding partner of Chubb & Son. Together, they were the parents of:

- Russell Parsons Pennoyer, who married Helen Elliot Bearn, a daughter of Dr. Alexander Gordon Bearn, in 1978.
- Christina Lee Pennoyer, who married R. Scott Greathead, a son of Edwin Burton Greathead, in 1982. They divorced in 1997.
- Tracy Pennoyer, a doctor who married Peter Sims Lowe, a son of William H. Lowe Jr., in 1979. They divorced and she married John Winthrop Auchincloss II, a son of author Louis Auchincloss, in 1988.
- Peter Pennoyer (b. 1957), an architect who married Katherine Lee "Katie" Ridder, a granddaughter of Bernard J. Ridder, in 1988.

Pennoyer died at his summer home in South Dartmouth, Massachusetts, on August 13, 2023.
