= Albert Pennoyer =

Artist and United States Army soldier

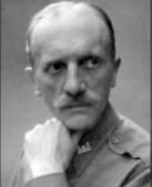
- Born: Albert Sheldon Pennoyer; April 5, 1888; Oakland, California
- Died: August 17, 1957 (aged 69); Madrid, Spain
- Relatives: Paul Pennoyer Sr. (brother); Paul Pennoyer Jr. (nephew); Robert Morgan Pennoyer (nephew)
- Military career
- Allegiance: United States of America
- Branch: United States Army, United States Air Force U.S. Army Corps of Engineers
- Rank: Captain
- Unit: Monuments, Fine Arts, and Archives (MFAA)
- Conflicts: World War I World War II

Captain Albert Sheldon Pennoyer (April 5, 1888 – August 17, 1957) was a renowned American artist and member of the Monuments Men in World War II.

== Early life and education ==
Pennoyer was born in 1888 in Oakland, California to Albert Adams Pennoyer and Virginia Vanderbilt Geddes Edmunds.

He received his early education as a boy in Geneva, Switzerland. He then studied at the Lawrenceville School in Lawrenceville, New Jersey.

Pennoyer initially went to college at the University of California, Berkeley, but was only there for one year before moving to Paris to study architecture at the École des Beaux-Arts. He later studied at the Académie de la Grande Chaumière, the Académie Julian, and the Pennsylvania Academy of the Fine Arts in Philadelphia. He studied throughout Europe and was mentored by various artists.

== Military career ==
=== World War I ===
As World War I began, Pennoyer returned to the United States. He was drafted in 1917 and became an active duty soldier. He served with the American Camouflage Corps of the United States Army Corps of Engineers until 1920, at which time he joined the Officers Reserve Corps.

=== World War II ===
During World War II, Pennoyer served in both the United States Army Air Forces and the U.S. Army Corps of Engineers before being assigned as a Monuments, Fine Arts, and Archives program (MFAA) Officer, where he worked to save art and was stationed in North Africa and Italy. The MFAA were also known as the Monuments Men.

==== Monuments Men ====
As a "Monuments Man," he helped to secure, repair, and recover art and Italy's many relics and cultural monuments, which faced destruction from the war and its collateral effects. He worked alongside other famous members of the Monuments Men including Captain Basil Marriott and Lt. Col. John Bryan Ward-Perkins in Rome. He also worked with Captain Roderick Enthoven and Lt. Frederick Hartt in Florence; and with Captain Deane Keller (portraitist) in Pisa.

He participated in the recovery effort in the Tuscan countryside, where Florentine officials had saved art from such museums as the Uffizi Gallery, Palazzo Pitti, and Bargello.

The efforts of the Monuments Men were memorialized in photographs largely thanks to Pennoyer, using his Leica Camera.

== Career as an artist ==
In 1921, Pennoyer opened his own studio on Manhattan's Upper East Side. The studio remained open for nearly forty years. His paintings have been exhibited at the Panama–Pacific International Exposition, Los Angeles County Museum of Art, and many other galleries in New York and California.

Pennoyer returned to the United States after World War II. His most recognized work are his paintings depicting railroad scenes, which are noted for their accuracy to real-life mechanics of locomotion. His paintings were so realistic that the Union Pacific Railroad commissioned some art from him. He founded the “Railroadians of America” Club.

== Memberships ==
Pennoyer was a member many art related organizations, including the American Federation of Arts; American Watercolor Society; Allied Artists of America; and the American Artists Professional League.

== Legacy and death ==
To this day, Pennoyer's paintings are included in prominent collections, including the California Palace of the Legion of Honor, Henry Ford Museum, Metropolitan Museum of Art, Smithsonian Institution, United States Military Academy, and the De Young Museum. His photographs are also in various galleries.

In 1957, Pennoyer went to Spain in preparation for a book, and on August 17, 1957, he was killed in a car accident in Madrid.

== Publications ==
- "This Was California" (1938)
- "Locomotives in Our Lives" (1954).
