= William Pennoyer =

British merchant and philanthropist (1603–1670)

- Born: 1603
- Died: February 1670; London
- Occupation: Merchant
- Known for: Bequests to found Pennoyer's School, Pulham St Mary & Hay-on-Wye; endowments at Harvard University

William Pennoyer was an English puritan merchant born in Bristol in 1603. In 1657 he was elected as Master of the Clothworkers' Company and he became a Governor of Christ's Hospital in 1659. As a successful merchant, he was involved in trading of cloth, tobacco, livestock and gunpowder, and he had interests in sugar plantations and fishing. He was involved in business ventures with the East India Company.

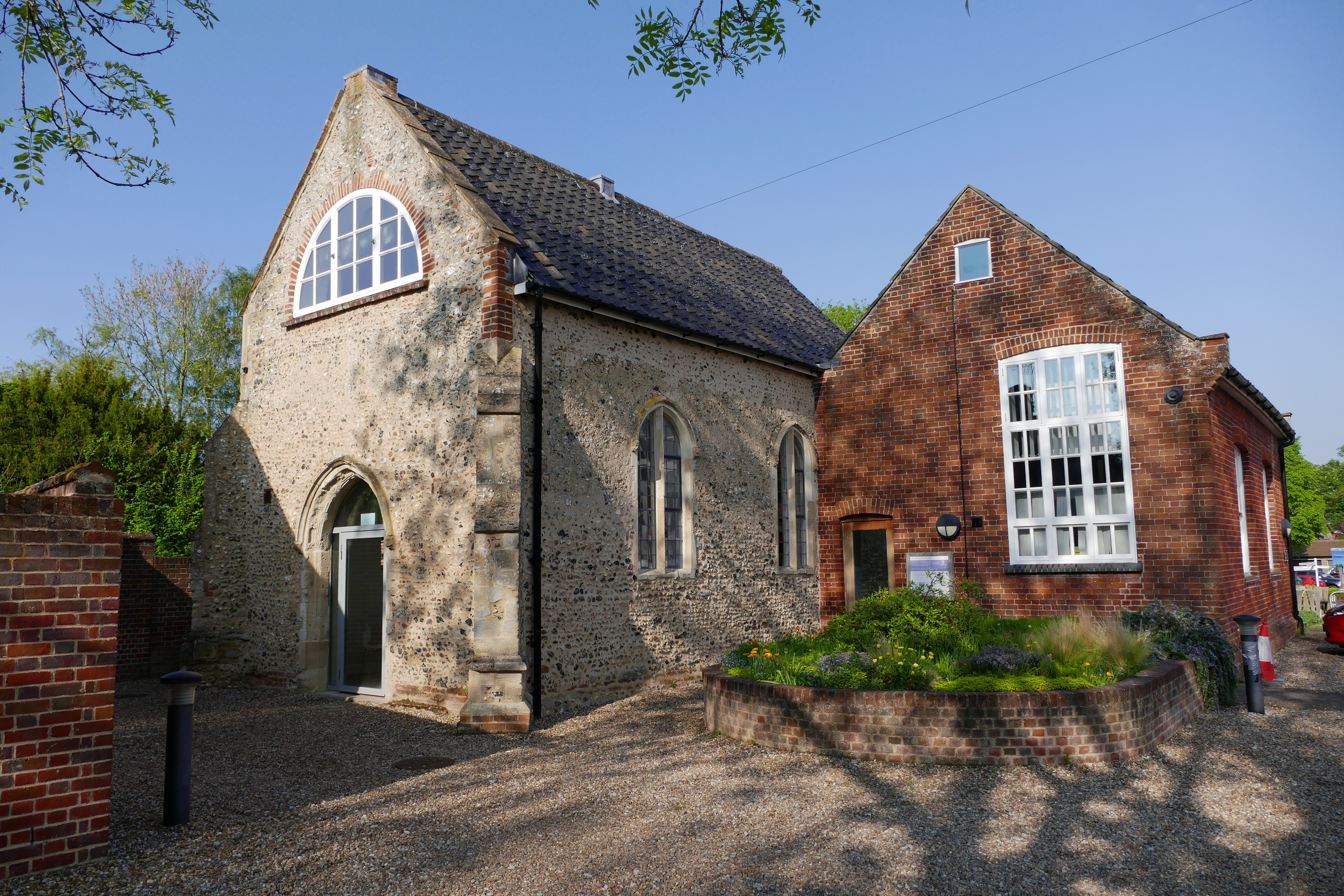
The chapel that became the Pennoyer School in Pulham St Mary, Norfolk

William Pennoyer was involved in the foundation of free "Pennoyer's Schools" in the village of Pulham St Mary, Norfolk and at Hay-on-Wye, Brecknockshire (now Powys). He made extensive charitable provisions in his will in connection with Christ's Hospital, Harvard College (now University) in Massachusetts and local charities in Pulham St Mary.

== Harvard University ==
In his will, Pennoyer left a 92 acres (37 ha; 0.144 sq mi) farm in Pulham St Mary to provide, from its income, funds for stipends for two Fellows and two Scholars at Harvard College. Preference was to go to descendants of his younger brother Robert, who lived in Massachusetts, and to candidates from New Haven Colony. By the late 19th century, agricultural depression in England had reduced the annual income and steps were taken to sell "Asten's Farm", as it had become known. In 1903 US$4,030 was realised and added to the Pennoyer Scholarship Fund. The scholarship continues to be available to qualifying applicants.

Among the recipients of Pennoyer scholarships have been historians Jared Sparks and John G. Palfrey and theologian George R. Noyes.
