= Providence Lying-In Hospital =

- U.S. National Register of Historic Places
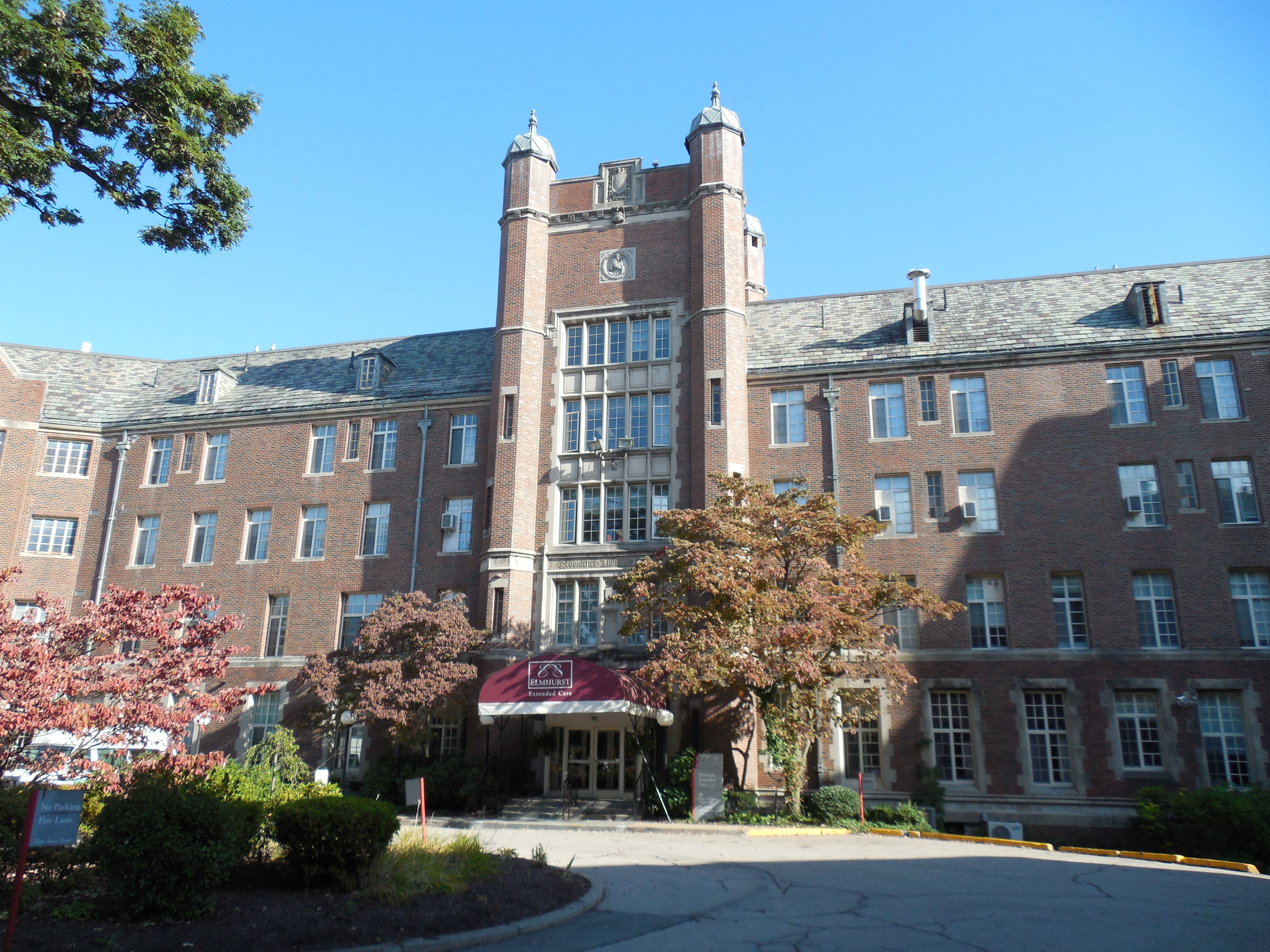
- Providence Lying-In Hospital

- Location within Rhode Island Location within the United States
- Location: 50 Maude Street, Providence, Rhode Island
- Coordinates: 41°50′8″N 71°25′47″W
- Built: 1922
- Architect: Stevens & Lee
- Architectural style: Late Gothic Revival
- NRHP reference No.: 86001512
- Added to NRHP: August 13, 1986

The Providence Lying-In Hospital (later known as Women & Infants Hospital) is a historic hospital building in Providence, Rhode Island. The main building is a 4 1/2-story Gothic Revival structure which was designed in 1922 by Edward Stevens of Stevens and Lee and completed in 1926. It was the city's fourth hospital. To the west of this building is the Nurses' Home, designed by Wallis E. Howe and completed in 1933, following the general architectural style of the first building. The hospital was the first in the state to specialize in obstetrical services and the first to offer specialized nurse training.

The building was listed on the National Register of Historic Places in 1986 and now houses a rehabilitation center and a hospice center.

== See also ==
- National Register of Historic Places listings in Providence, Rhode Island
- General Lying-In Hospital
