= Paul Pennoyer Jr. =

Lawyer and United States Navy officer

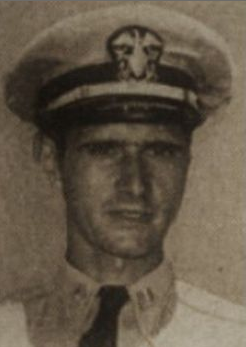
- Born: Paul Geddes Pennoyer Jr. February 11, 1920; New York City, US
- Died: January 7, 2010 (aged 89); Locust Valley, New York, US
- Alma mater: Harvard University (A.B.); Harvard Law School (LL.B.)
- Spouse: Cecily Henderson
- Children: 5
- Relatives: J. P. Morgan Jr. (grandfather); Robert Morgan Pennoyer (brother); Albert Pennoyer (uncle); Sylvester Pennoyer (great great uncle)
- Military career
- Allegiance: United States of America
- Branch: United States Navy
- Rank: Lieutenant Junior Grade
- Unit: Naval Air Squadron
- Commands: Air Group 28
- Conflicts: World War II: Battle of the Philippine Sea; Battle of the Solomon Islands
- Awards: Navy Cross; Air Cross; NMHS Distinguished Service Award

Paul Geddes Pennoyer Jr. (February 11, 1920 – January 7, 2010) was an American lawyer and Naval hero who was a member of the Morgan family. He is the grandson of J. P. Morgan Jr.

== Early life and education ==
Pennoyer was born on February 11, 1920, in Manhattan, New York City, to Frances Morgan Pennoyer and Paul Pennoyer Sr. His mother was the daughter of J. P. Morgan Jr. He grew up in Locust Valley, New York, with his parents, his brother, Robert Morgan Pennoyer, and four sisters.

His maternal grandparents were John Pierpont Morgan Jr. and Jane Norton Morgan. Among his extended family was uncle Junius Spencer Morgan III. Through another uncle, Henry Sturgis Morgan, co-founder of Morgan Stanley (who married Adams family descendant Catherine Adams), he was a first cousin of Henry Sturgis Morgan Jr. and John Adams Morgan. His great, great uncle was Sylvester Pennoyer, the 8th governor of Oregon.

He attended St. Paul's School in New Hampshire. He then attended Harvard University and graduated in 1942 with a Bachelors of Science degree. He was a varsity oarsman on the undefeated Harvard crew team in 1941.

== Naval career ==
Pennoyer was a World War II pilot for Air Group 28 attached to the USS Monterey aircraft carrier during the first Battle of the Philippine Sea on June 20, 1944. He achieved the rank of Lieutenant Junior Grade. He battled major units of the Japanese fleet and was awarded the Navy Cross for extraordinary heroism.

Pennoyer was also involved in air strikes in the Solomon Islands in June and July 1943. As a result of that battle, he received the Air Medal. He was also awarded the Gold Star by Secretary of the Navy James Forrestal in September 1944.

He received a second Gold Star as a pilot of the Torpedo Bombers.

He was presented a third Gold Star again for his achievement piloting a Torpedo Bomber in the Philippines from May through December 1944.

While in the Navy, he spent a month on a supply ship and became lifelong friends with John F. Kennedy.

== Post-Navy legal career ==
Upon leaving the Navy, Pennoyer graduated from Harvard Law School in 1948. Following his graduation and passing the bar, he was hired by Law Firm of Bigham, Englar Jones & Houston, and he started their Aviation Legal Department. He was at that firm from 1949 to 1963, having become a Partner in 1955.

After leaving that firm, he would become a partner and principal litigator at the Law Firm of Chadbourne, Parke, Whiteside & Wolf, where he specialized in Anti-Trust, Securities, and Federal Agency cases. He was at that firm for the next 30 years.

In 1976, he argued the case, Piper v. Chris-Craft Industries, Inc., before the United States Supreme Court.

He retired in 1992.

== Personal life ==
He was married to Cecily Henderson Pennoyer, on February 5, 1949, and they had five children.

Prior to his death, he published his memoirs, entitled A Descendant, But Not an Heir. In the memoir, he stated,

“The one thought I leave with my children, grandchildren and down the ages is that the legal profession, possibly more than any other, gives you a clear picture and understanding of what makes our society work and, in some cases not work. And it gives you also a view of the good side and of the ugly side of human nature in all its shadings of the good and the bad.”

He died on January 7, 2010, at the age of 89, in Locust Valley, New York.

== Awards ==
- Navy Cross
- Air Medal
- Gold Star (2)
- National Maritime Historical Society (NMHS) - Distinguished Service Award.

== Citations ==
The citation on his Navy Cross stated:

“The President of the United States of America takes pleasure in presenting the Navy Cross to Lieutenant, Junior Grade Paul Geddes Pennoyer, Jr., United States Naval Reserve … for extraordinary heroism in operations against the enemy. The attack was pressed under intense anti-aircraft fire from many heavily armed units of the enemy Fleet and was prosecuted with cool deliberation and disregard of extreme personal danger. His attack was carried to a low level to insure definite damage to the enemy and resulted in three hits and a near miss on an enemy carrier. After the attack he successfully flew his plane after dark through unfavorable weather, a distance of 300 miles, to his parent carrier whereupon he made a safe landing. His skill and display of courage were in keeping with the highest traditions of the United States Naval Service.”

== Memberships ==
Pennoyer was Trustee of the Frick Collection since 1975 and Trustee of Long Island University from 1975 to 1985. He was a member of several committees of the Frick Collection and served as vice president and Secretary of the board of trustees.

He was a Member of the American Bar Association; New York State Bar Association; New York City Bar Association; the New York Bar Foundation; and the American College of Trial Lawyers. He was also a member of the New York Yacht Club.

He was barred in the following jurisdictions: New York (1942); United States District Court (southern and eastern districts) New York (1952); United States Court 2nd District Court of Appeal circuit (1964); Supreme Court of the United States Court (1972); United States Court Appeals (4th circuit) 1986; and the United States Court Appeals (11th circuit) (1987).

== Gallery ==
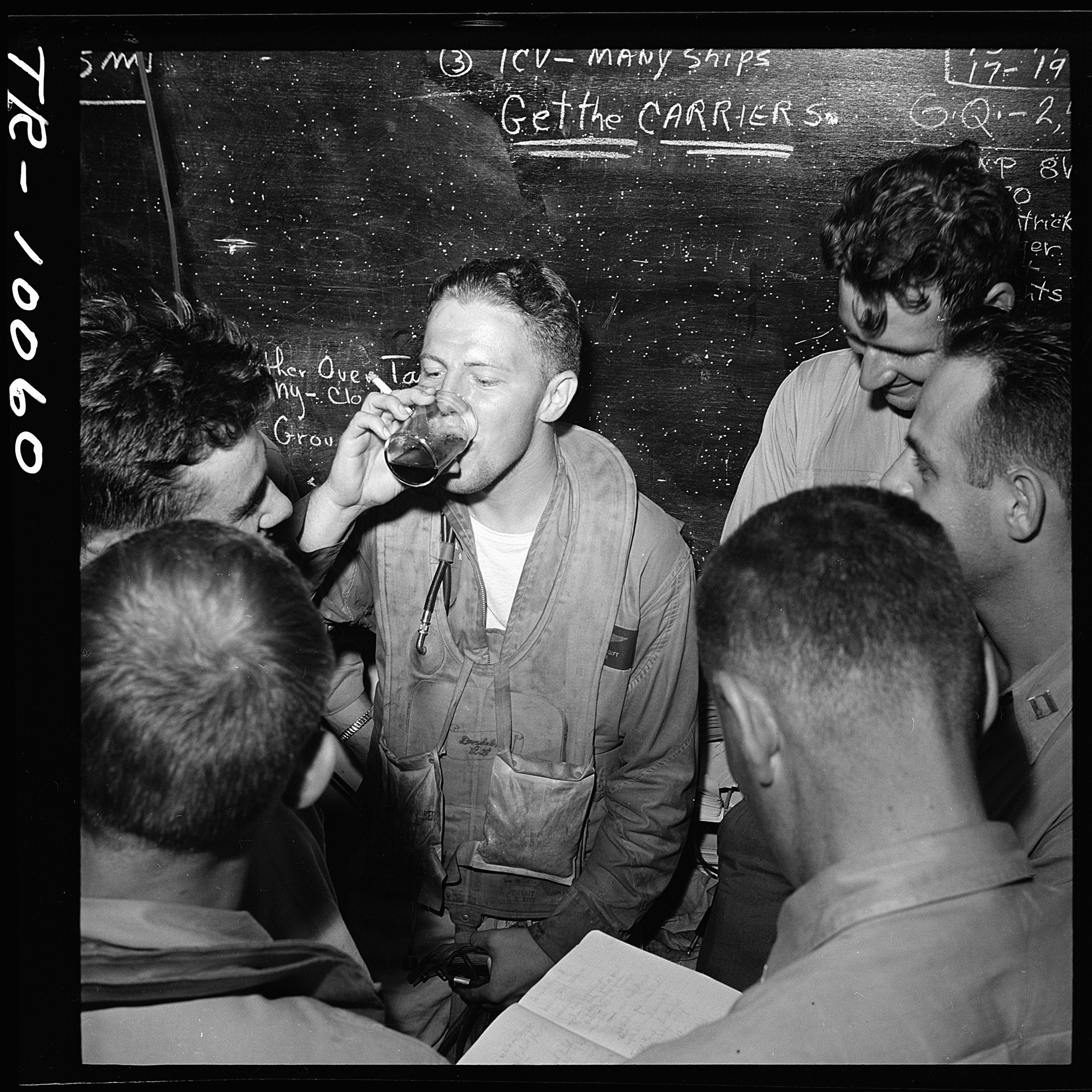
Paul Pennoyer with his back against the board on the USS Monterey in 1944.

== Publications ==
- A Descendant, But Not an Heir. Paul Pennoyer Jr. 2008.
