= J. P. Morgan Jr. =

American banker (1867–1943)

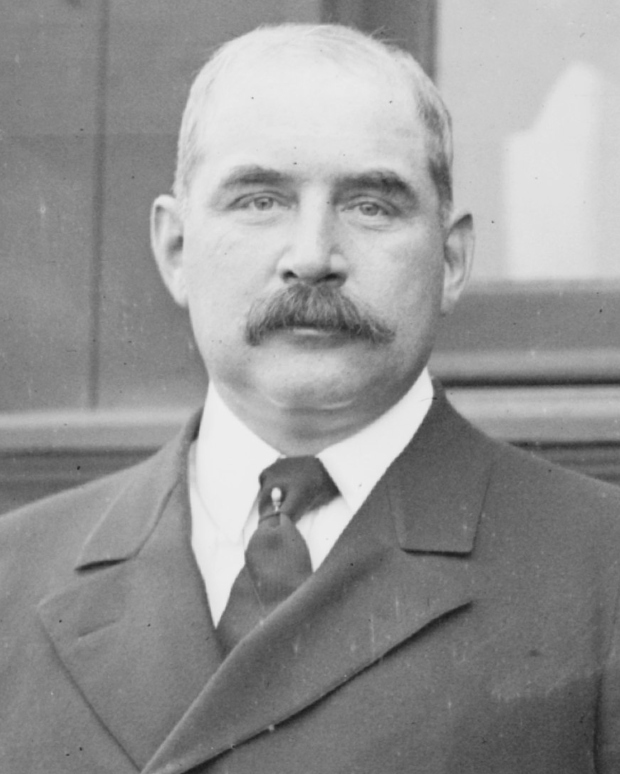
- Morgan in 1913
- Born: John Pierpont Morgan Jr. September 7, 1867; Irvington, New York, U.S.
- Died: March 13, 1943 (aged 75); Boca Grande, Florida, U.S.
- Education: Harvard University (BA)
- Spouse: Jane Norton Grew (m. 1890; died 1925)
- Children: 4, including Junius and Henry
- Father: J. P. Morgan
- Relatives: See Morgan family

John Pierpont Morgan Jr. (September 7, 1867 – March 13, 1943) was an American banker and finance executive. He inherited the family fortune and took over the business interests including J.P. Morgan & Co. after his father, J. P. Morgan, died in 1913.

After graduating from St. Paul's School and Harvard College, Morgan trained as a finance executive working for his father and grandfather. He became a banking financier, a lending leader, and a director of several companies. He supported New York's Society for the Lying-In Hospital, the Red Cross, the Episcopal Church, and endowed the creation of a rare book and manuscript collection at the Morgan Library.

Morgan brokered a deal that positioned his company as the sole munitions and supplies purchaser during World War I for the British and French governments, bringing his company a 1% commission on $3 billion ($30 million). He was also a banking broker for financing to foreign governments both during and after the war.

== Early life ==
John Pierpont Morgan Jr, nicknamed Jack, was born on September 7, 1867, in Irvington, New York, to J. P. Morgan and Frances Louisa Tracy. He graduated from St. Paul's School, and later in 1886 from Harvard College, where he was a member of the Alpha chapter of Delta Kappa Epsilon.

His siblings included Louisa Pierpont Morgan (1866–1946), who married Herbert L. Satterlee (1863–1947), Juliet Pierpont Morgan (1870–1952) who married William Pierson Hamilton (1869–1950), and Anne Tracy Morgan (1873–1952), a philanthropist. His paternal grandparents were Junius Spencer Morgan (1813–1890) and Juliet Pierpont (1816–1884), the daughter of John Pierpont.

== Career ==
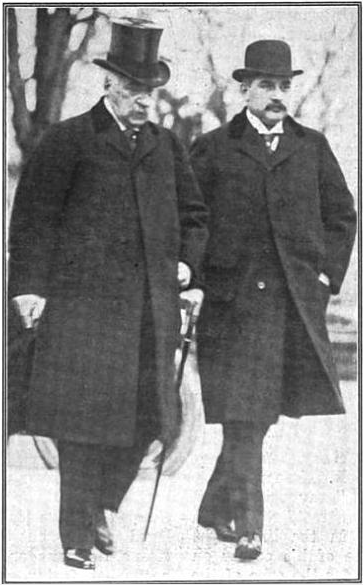
Morgan with his father in the last known photograph of the two together (c. 1913)

The younger Morgan emulated his father in his dislike for publicity, and he continued his father's philanthropic policy. In 1905, Morgan's father acquired the Guaranty Trust bank as part of his efforts to consolidate banking in New York City. After his father died in 1913, the bank became Morgan's base.

=== World War I ===
Morgan played a prominent part in financing World War I. Following its outbreak, he made the first loan of $12,000,000 to Russia. In 1915, a loan of $500,000,000 was made to France and Britain following negotiations by the Anglo-French Financial Commission. The firm's involvement with British and French interests fueled charges the bank was conspiring to maneuver the United States into supporting the Allies in order to rescue its loans. By 1915, when it became apparent the war was not going to end quickly, the company decided to forge formal relationships with France. Those dealings became strained over the course of the war as a result of poor personal relations with French emissaries, relationships that were heightened in importance by the unexpected duration of the conflict, its costs, and the complications flowing from American neutrality. Contributing to the tensions was the favoritism displayed by Morgan officials to British interests. His personal friendship with Cecil Spring Rice ensured that from 1915 until sometime after the United States entered the war, his firm was the official purchasing agent for the British government, buying cotton, steel, chemicals and food, receiving a 1% commission on all purchases. Morgan organized a syndicate of about 2200 banks and floated a loan of $500,000,000 to the Allies. The British sold off their holdings of American securities and by late 1916 were dependent on unsecured loans for further purchases.

At the beginning of World War I, US Treasury Secretary William McAdoo and others in the Wilson administration were very suspicious of J. P. Morgan & Co.'s enthusiastic role as British agent for purchasing and banking. When the United States entered the war, this gave way to close collaboration, in the course of which Morgan received financial concessions. From 1914 to 1919, he was a member of the advisory council for the Federal Reserve Bank of New York.

On July 3, 1915, an assassin, Eric Muenter, entered Morgan's mansion, known as Matinecock Point, on East Island in Glen Cove, Long Island, and shot him twice. This was ostensibly to bring about an embargo on arms, and in protest of his profiteering from war. Morgan, however, quickly recovered from his wounds.

=== Postwar ===
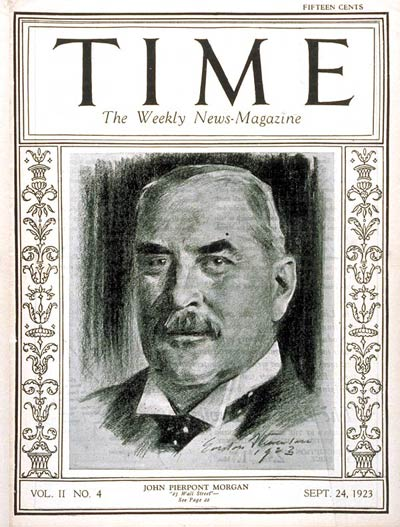
Time cover (September 24, 1923)

After World War I and the Versailles Treaty, Morgan Guaranty managed Germany's reparation payments. After the war, Morgan made several trips to Europe to investigate and report on financial conditions there. In 1919, he was for a time chairman of the international committee – composed of American, British and French bankers – for the protection of the holders of Mexican securities. In November 1919, he was made a director of the Foreign Finance Corporation, which was organized to engage in the investment of funds chiefly in foreign enterprises.

By the 1920s, Morgan Guaranty had become one of the world's most important banking institutions, as a leading lender to Germany and Europe. During the Great Depression, however, he took heavy financial losses. The assets of the House of Morgan fell 40% from $704 million to $425 million. American banking came under heavy attack. Morgan personified banking, and he drew attacks from politicians, especially in the U.S. Senate's Pecora hearings of 1932, which "created a tidal wave of anger against Wall Street".

In 1933, Morgan, Jr. was allegedly one of the conspirators behind the Business Plot, an attempt to install a fascist dictatorship in the United States. He also supported Benito Mussolini in Fascist Italy with a loan of US$100 million.

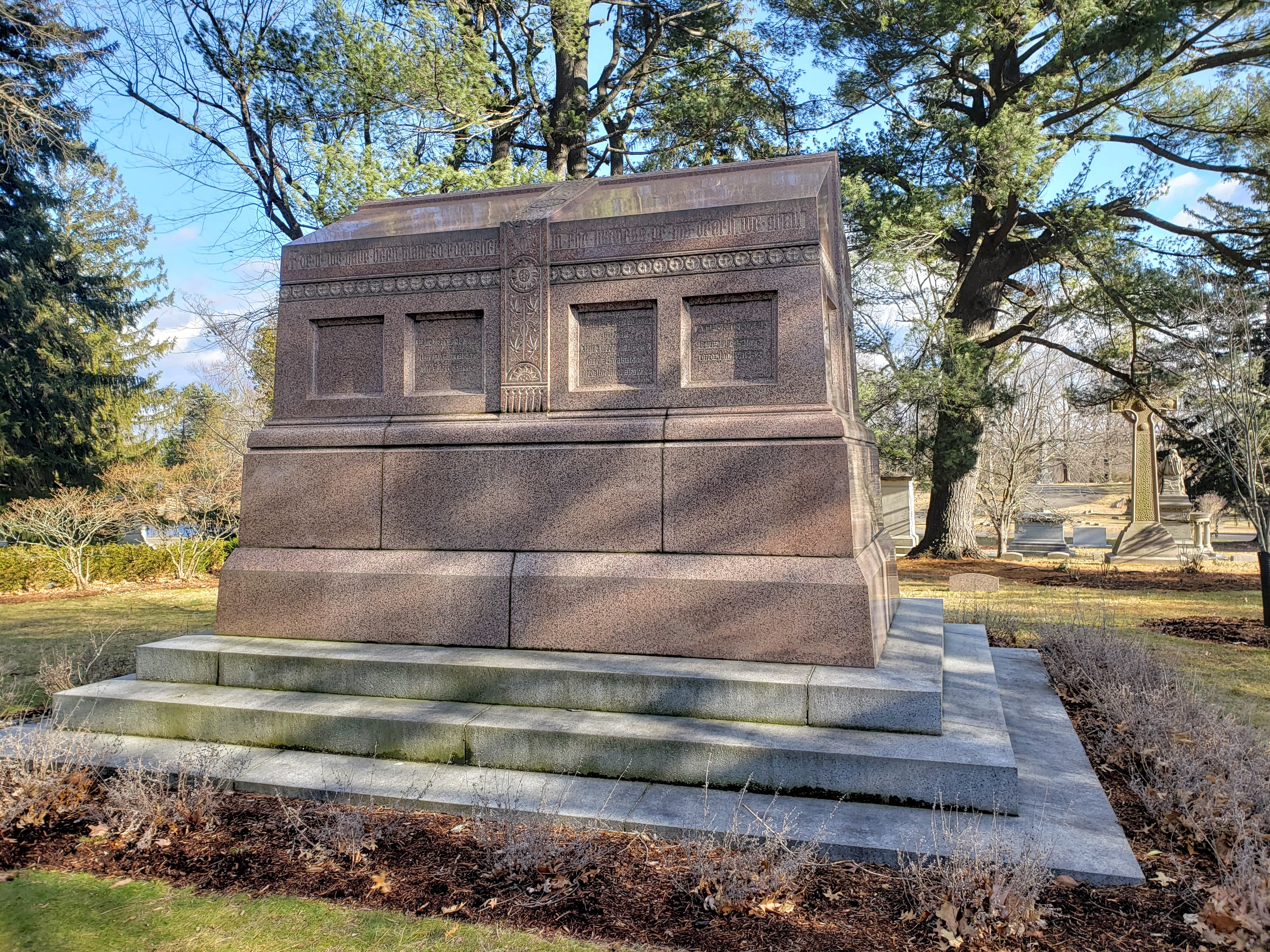
Morgan family monument at Cedar Hill Cemetery in Hartford, Connecticut

Morgan was a director of numerous corporations, including the U.S. Steel Corp., the Pullman Co., the Aetna Insurance Co., and the Northern Pacific Railway Co. He died of a stroke on March 13, 1943, in Boca Grande, Florida.

== Personal life ==
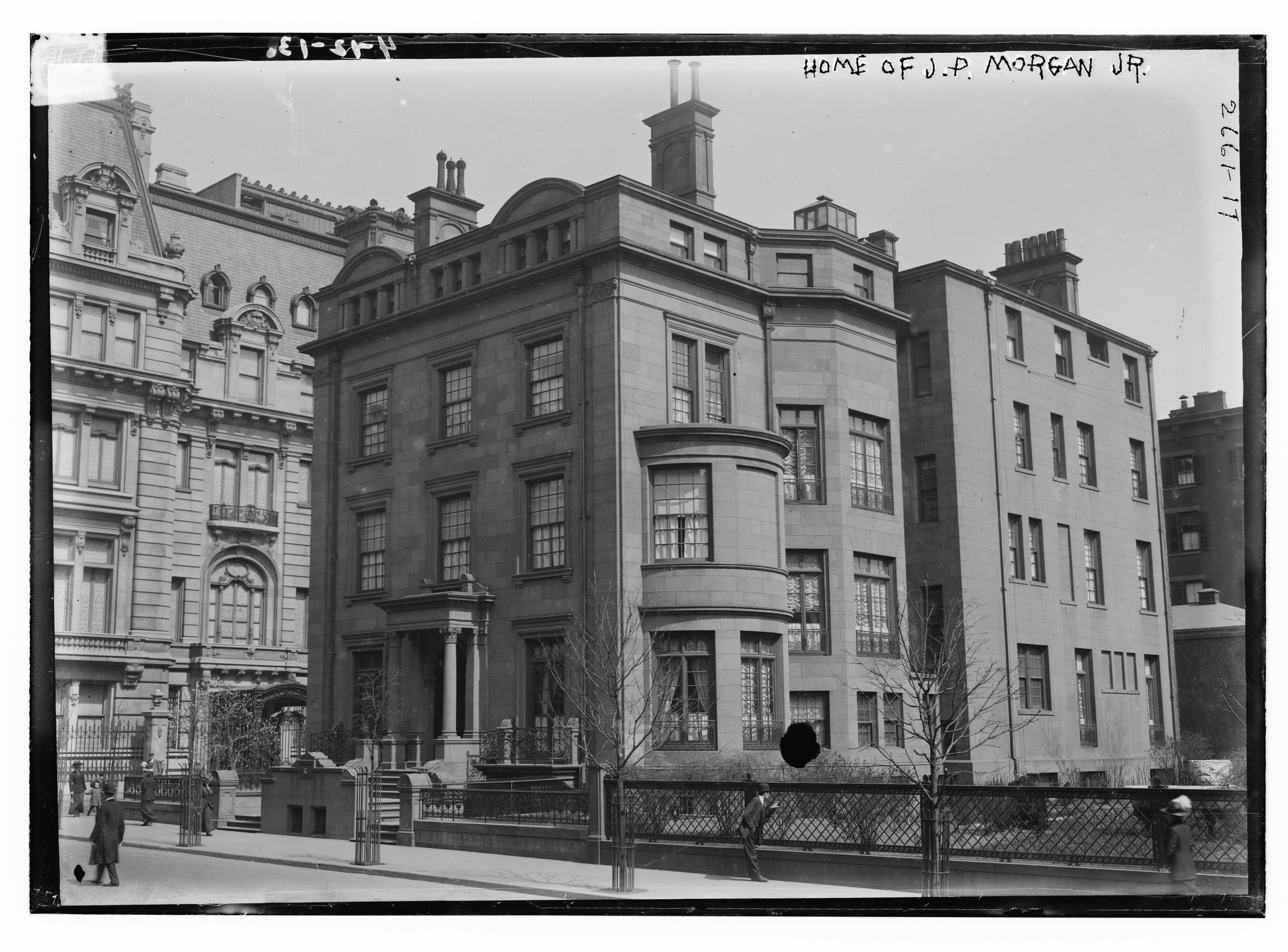
Morgan's brownstone mansion on Madison Avenue, which is now part of the Morgan Library & Museum

In 1890, Morgan married Jane Norton Grew (1868–1925), daughter of Boston banker and mill owner Henry Sturgis Grew. She was the aunt of Henry Grew Crosby. The couple had four children:

- Junius Spencer Morgan III (1892–1960), who married Louise Converse (1895–1974), daughter of Frederick Shepherd Converse, in 1915.
- Jane Norton Morgan Nichols (1893–1981), who married George Nichols (1878–1950), a brother of John Treadwell Nichols.
- Frances Tracy Pennoyer (1897–1989), who married Paul Geddes Pennoyer (1890–1970), a lawyer, in 1917.
- Henry Sturgis Morgan (1900–1982), a founding partner of Morgan Stanley who married Catherine Lovering Adams (1902–1988), daughter of Charles Francis Adams III, descendants of the 2nd U.S. President, John Adams.

=== Philanthropy ===
In 1920, Morgan gave his London residence, 14 Prince's Gate (near Imperial College London), to the U.S. government for use as its embassy.

In 1924, Morgan created the Pierpont Morgan Library as a public institution as a memorial to his father. Belle da Costa Greene, Morgan's personal librarian, became the first director and continued the aggressive acquisition and expansion of the collections of illuminated manuscripts, authors' original manuscripts, incunabula, prints, and drawings, early printed Bibles, and many examples of fine bookbinding. Today the library is a complex of buildings which serve as a museum and scholarly research center.

Morgan Jr. donated a very substantial portion of his father's collection to the Metropolitan Museum of Art.

=== Social ===
J. Pierpont Morgan, jun., was elected a Fellow of the Zoological Society of London (FZS) in 1903.

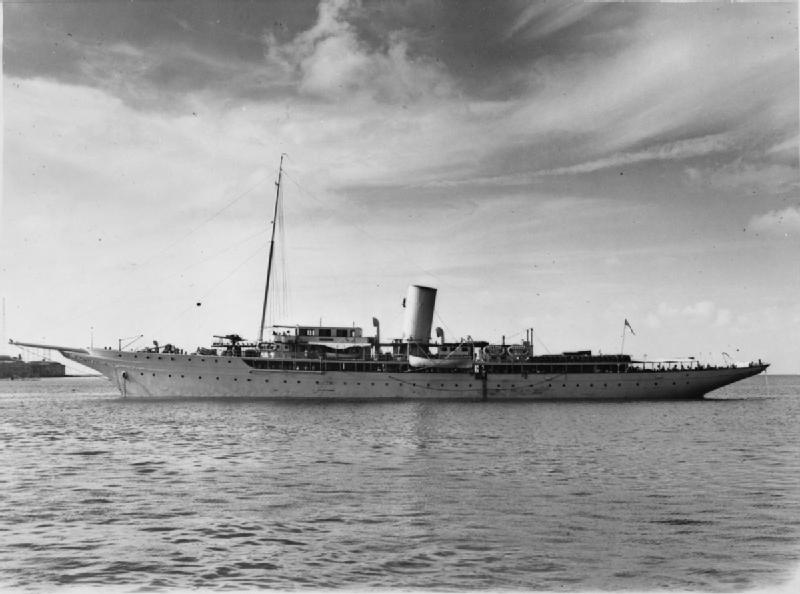
The Corsair IV was Morgan's yacht from 1930 to 1940.

A yachtsman like his father, Morgan served from 1919 to 1921 as commodore of the New York Yacht Club. In 1930, he built the turbo electric driven yacht Corsair IV at Bath Iron Works in Maine. The Corsair IV, launched on April 10, 1930, was one of the most opulent yachts of its day and the largest built in the United States, with an overall length of 343 feet (104.5 m), 42 feet (12.8 m) beam and 2,142 GRT. Legend at the shipyard credits the phrase "If you have to ask, you can't afford it" to Morgan, when asked what the yacht cost. However, this quote is most often attributed to his father in connection with the yacht Corsair, which was launched in 1891.

Morgan sold the Corsair IV to the British Admiralty in 1940 for one dollar to assist with Britain's war effort. After the war, the Corsair IV was sold to Pacific Cruise Lines and, on September 29, 1947, began service as a luxury cruise ship operating between Long Beach, California, and Acapulco, Mexico. On November 12, 1949, the yacht struck a rock near the beach in Acapulco and, although all passengers and crew were rescued, it was deemed a total loss.

Morgan was a member of the Jekyll Island Club (a.k.a. "The Millionaires' Club") on Jekyll Island, Georgia, as was his father.

Business positions
Preceded by position created	Chairman of J.P. Morgan & Co. January 31, 1943 – March 13, 1943	Succeeded by Thomas W. Lamont
Preceded by Elbert H. Gary	Chairman of U.S. Steel; August 15, 1927 – March 29, 1932	Succeeded by Myron C. Taylor
Awards and achievements
Preceded by Israel Zangwill	Cover of Time Magazine; September 24, 1923	Succeeded by Samuel Gompers
