= Paul Pennoyer Sr. =

American diplomat and attorney

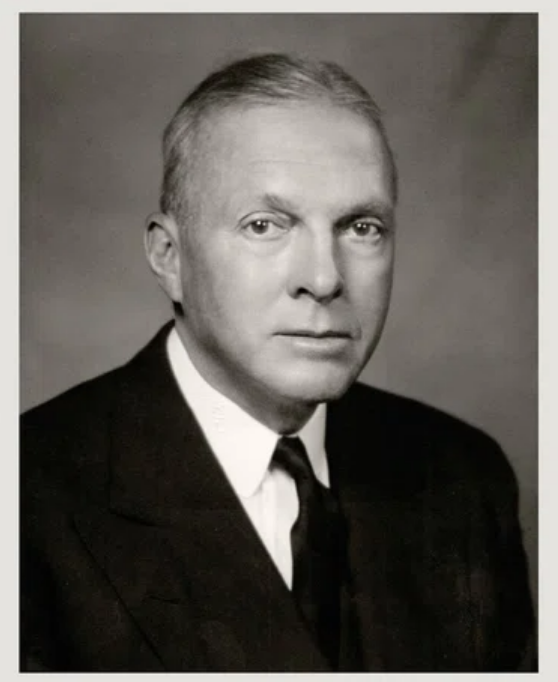
- Born: Paul Geddes Pennoyer Sr. October 30, 1890; Oakland, California
- Died: June 30, 1971 (aged 80); Locust Valley, New York
- Alma mater: Harvard University (A.B.); Harvard Law School (LL.B.)
- Spouse: Frances Morgan
- Children: 6 - Paul Pennoyer Jr., Robert Morgan Pennoyer
- Relatives: J. P. Morgan Jr. (father-in-law); Albert Pennoyer (brother)
- Military career
- Allegiance: United States of America
- Branch: United States Army, United States Air Force
- Rank: Colonel
- Units: 305th Field Artillery, 77th Division (WWI)
- Conflicts: World War I World War II
- Awards: Legion of Merit; Chevalier of the Légion d'honneur (Legion of Honor, France)
- Other work: Lawyer, Diplomat, Statesman

Paul Geddes Pennoyer Sr. LH (30 Oct 1890 – June 30, 1971) was an American lawyer, diplomat, and military veteran who was a member of the Morgan family. He is the son-in-law of J. P. Morgan Jr.

== Early life and education ==
Pennoyer was born on October 30, 1890 in Oakland, California to Albert Adams Pennoyer and Virginia Vanderbilt Geddes Edmunds.

He received his early education as a boy in Geneva, Switzerland. He then studied at the Lawrenceville School in New Jersey. He first enrolled in college at the University of California, Berkeley, before transferring to Harvard.

He graduated from Harvard College in 1914, with an A.B. degree, and received his Juris Doctor from Harvard Law School in 1917. In 1913, during his junior year at Harvard, he served as private secretary to John W. Garrett, the American Minister to Argentina, in Buenos Aires.

== Military career ==
=== World War I ===
During World War I, he was called into active duty on November 27, 1917. Pennoyer served overseas in Europe with the 305th Field Artillery, 77th Division, in the Artillery Intelligence Service, and as liaison officer with units of the French Army on the Western Front. He fought in the Battle of Saint-Mihiel and the Meuse–Argonne offensive. He served overseas from April 26, 1918 to May 5, 1919.

Pennoyer was a Captain of field artillery at his dischargeon May 15, 1919. After the Armistice, he served as Aide-de-camp to Maj. Gen. William S. McNair, Chief of Artillery of the First Army of the American Expeditionary Forces.

=== World War II ===
During World War II, in 1942, he spent some months with the United States Air Force and then transferred to the operations division of the War Department General Staff, where he worked until 1945. From 1943 and 1944, he had two tours of duty as observer for the General Staff in the China Burma India theater. Upon his discharge, he had achieved the rank of Colonel, General Staff Corps.

=== United Nations ===
In 1945, while still in the United States Armed Forces, Pennoyer served on the staff of the State-War-Navy Coordinating Committee in Washington, D.C. Later in 1945, he was sent to San Francisco by the United States Department of State to serve in the United Nations Secretariat of the United Nations Conference on International Organization. He was at the San Francisco conference for the formation of the United Nations.

== Legal career ==
He was a member of the New York law firm of White & Case since 1920, having only taken a three year hiatus to work as an investment banker. After the end of his military career, Pennoyer restarted his career as a lawyer. From 1937 to 1939, Pennoyer worked out of the law firm's Paris office. He was Managing Partner of the law firm for 19 years.

== Awards and honors ==
In 1945, the U.S. Army awarded him the Legion of Merit. In 1962, the French Government made him a Chevalier of the Légion d'honneur (Legion of Honor), the highest award given by the French government.

== Memberships ==
Pennoyer served as a member, officer, or trustee of many organizations. These included: Board of Managers of the Harvard Club of New York City; Trustee and Secretary of the Pierpont Morgan Library; Treasurer and trustee of the Spence School in New York; director, trustee and secretary of the Philharmonic-Symphony Society of New York; director of the executive committee and secretary of the France America Society; the Society of Mayflower Descendants; and the Council on Foreign Relations.

He was also a governor of New York Hospital; a trustee and former chairman of the Police Relief Association of Nassau County; and a fellow of the Frick Collection.

He was also a member of several clubs, including the Bohemian Club in San Francisco; the Piping Rock Club; and the Century Association.

== Houses ==
=== Round Bush ===
J. P. Morgan Jr. purchased Round Bush for his daughter, Frances Morgan and his son-in-law, Paul Pennoyer. The Tudor-style house was designed in 1917 by architect, Roger Bullard of the architectural firm, Goodwin, Bullard & Woolsey. The estate originally comprised 72 acres and was located in Locust Valley, New York.

=== Lake Tahoe ===
In 1936, Pennoyer and his wife commissioned Berkeley architect, Roland I. Stringham, to design a mountain home in Lake Tahoe. Frances Pennoyer sold a large Cartier Ruby Pendant to her brother, Harry S. Morgan, to fund the purchase of the home. Stringham designed the home in what he dubbed, "mountain craftsman." Paul's youngest brother, Albert Pennoyer, a noted artist and Monuments Man of World War II, oversaw the final stages of the project.

== Family and death ==
On June 16, 1917, Pennoyer was married to Frances Tracy Morgan, the daughter of J. P. Morgan Jr. of the Morgan family, known as "America's Greatest Banker". They had six children together, including Robert Morgan Pennoyer and Paul Pennoyer Jr. His great uncle was Sylvester Pennoyer, the 8th governor of Oregon.

His brother, Richard Edmunds Pennoyer, was married to the Dowager Countess of Shrewsbury, Winifed Hester Constance Paget.

He died on June 30, 1971 in Locust Valley, New York.
