= Artisan Partners =

American asset management company

Artisan Partners Asset Management Inc.
- Type: Public
- Traded as: NYSE: APAM; S&P 600 component
- Industry: Investment management
- Founded: December 1994; 31 years ago
- Founders: Andrew Ziegler; Carlene Ziegler
- Headquarters: Milwaukee, Wisconsin, United States
- Key people: Jason Gottlieb (CEO)
- Products: Mutual funds; Separately managed accounts; Collective Investment Trusts
- Revenue: ▲US$1.20 billion (2025)
- Net income: ▲US$290 million (2025)
- AUM: US$146.4 billion (July 2023)
- Total assets: ▼US$1.58 billion (2025)
- Total equity: ▲US$439 million (2025)
- Number of employees: ▲549 (2022)
- Website: www.artisanpartners.com

Artisan Partners is an American asset management company headquartered in Milwaukee, Wisconsin. Outside the United States, the company has offices in Dublin, Hong Kong, London, Singapore and Sydney.

== History ==
In 1994, Andrew Ziegler, the President of Strong Capital Management left the firm to found Artisan Partners with his wife Carlene who also worked at the firm as a portfolio manager.

In 1995, Artisan partners started its first fund strategy in small-cap growth equity for American companies.

In 2002, Artisan partners added a global value team to focus on markets outside the United States.

In 2006, Hellman & Friedman took a minority stake in Artisan Partners. In the same year, Artisan Partners added an emerging markets team via a liftout from DuPont Capital Management.

In 2008, Carlene Ziegler retired from the company to focus on her family's charitable foundation.

In 2010, Andrew Ziegler stepped down from his role as CEO to take the new role of executive chairman and was succeeded by Eric Colson.

In April 2011, Artisan Partners filed for an initial public offering (IPO). However, in December, it withdrew its IPO plans citing unfavourable market conditions .

In November 2012, Artisan Partners made a second attempt to go public. On March 7, 2013, it successfully listed on the New York Stock Exchange (NYSE) opening at $35.20 per share which was 17% above its $40 offer price and raised a total of $332 million. The company planned to the proceeds to repay debt, buy back shares from early investors and pay a distribution to pre-IPO partners

In 2014, Artisan Partners which up to this point only handled equity investments, added a credit team to invest in high-yield debt. In the same year Andrew Ziegler stepped down as executive chairman after selling 1.4 million shares during a secondary market offering.

In September 2018, Artisan Partners restructured its Global Value team into two groups. One will invest outside of American markets while the other will focus on American markets.

In June 2023, Artisan Partners became a member of the S&P 600 index.

== Shareholder activism ==
In May 2015, Artisan Partners called for The Adecco Group to reconsider appointing Alain Dehaze as its CEO.

In January 2016, Artisan Partners called for Johnson & Johnson to consider separating its three divisions, consumer products, pharmaceuticals and medical devices into standalone companies. It also suggested replacing board members and reviewing standards for executive pay and financial reporting. The consumer health division of Johnson & Johnson was later spun off as Kenvue and listed on the NYSE in May 2023.

In February 2021, Artisan Partners urged the board of directors of Danone to oust its chairman and CEO, Emmanuel Faber. On March 15, 2023, the board ousted Faber with 10 out of 15 members voting against him.

In December 2021, Artisan backed Toshiba's plan to split into three companies.

In January 2022, Artisan Partners called for Seven & I Holdings to split up the company.

In May 2022, Artisan Partners called for Credit Suisse to replace its CEO, Thomas Gottstein. In July 2022, Gottstein resigned and was replaced by Ulrich Körner.
