= Ulrich Körner =

German-Swiss business executive (born 1962)

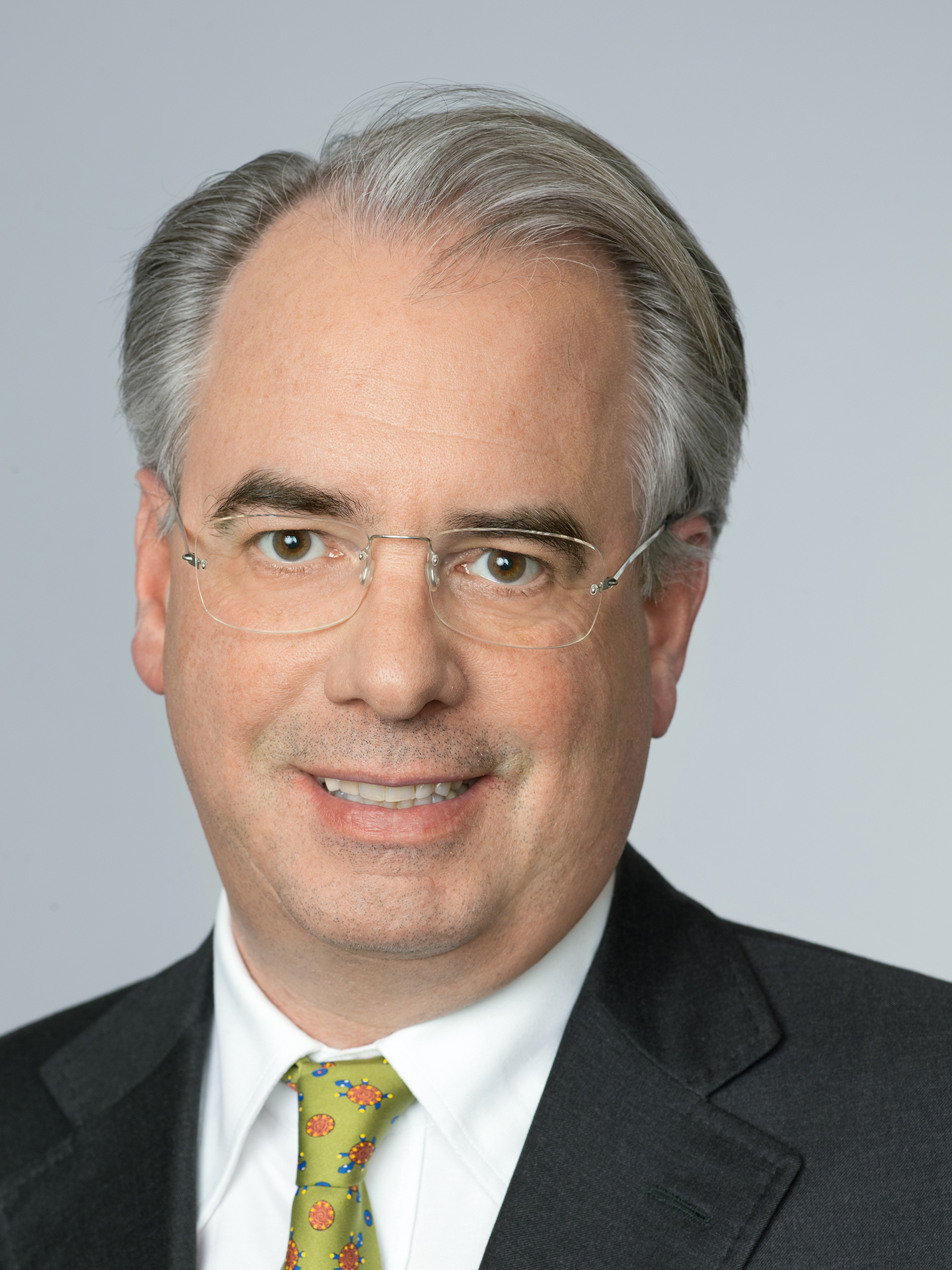
- Born: October 25, 1962 (age 63); Germany
- Education: University of St. Gallen (MA, PhD)
- Occupation: Business executive
- Title: CEO Credit Suisse Group AG
- Term: 2022–2024
- Predecessor: Thomas Gottstein
- Board member of: UBS (Group Executive Board), Lyceum Alpinum Zuoz, Swiss-American Chamber of Commerce (Financial Service Chapter Board), University of Zurich (Advisory Board of the Department of Banking and Finance)
- Children: 3

Ulrich Körner (born October 25, 1962) is a German-Swiss business executive. In March 2021, he was named CEO Asset Management of Credit Suisse until July 2022, when he was appointed CEO of Credit Suisse AG.

== Education ==
From 1980 to 1983, Körner attended the Lyceum Alpinum in Zuoz, Switzerland, and acquired a Swiss school-leaving certificate (Matura, type B), after having received a German school-leaving certificate (Abitur) from the Staatliches Ludwigsgymnasium in Saarbrücken, Germany, which he attended from 1973 to 1980.

Körner holds a Master of Arts and a Ph.D. in business administration from the University of St. Gallen, Switzerland.

Körner majored in Banking and Finance from 1983 to 1988 and graduated with a degree in Business Administration (lic.oec.) from the University of St. Gallen. Thereafter, he completed his doctoral studies (from 1988 to 1993) and received a Ph.D. in Business Administration (Dr.oec) from the University of St. Gallen for Business Administration, Economics, Law and Social Sciences.

== Career ==
In 1989, Körner began his professional career as an auditor with Price Waterhouse, Zurich. From 1993 to 1998, he was a management consultant with McKinsey & Company in Zurich.

Körner joined Credit Suisse as chief financial officer (CFO) for Switzerland in 1998. He then became head of technology and services in 2000, before assuming the role of CFO at Credit Suisse in 2002. In to this role, he was appointed chief operating officer (COO) in 2004. In 2006, he became chief executive officer of Credit Suisse Switzerland. Körner was a member of the executive board at Credit Suisse until he moved to UBS.

In April 2009, Körner joined UBS as group COO and member of the executive board under Oswald Grübel. Until 2013, he was responsible for the Corporate Center at UBS. It consisted of 25,000 people and included Group Strategy, Human Resources, Group Technology, Group Operations, Communications and Branding, Corporate Real Estate and Administrative Services and Supply and Demand Management during his time as group COO.

Körner has been president of UBS Group Europe, Middle East and Africa, comprising 29 countries, since December 2011. Together with the divisional CEOs, he is responsible for the implementation of regional strategy and the collaboration of businesses across all divisions.

In January 2014, Körner succeeded John A. Fraser to become president of asset management in addition to his regional leadership. CFO Tom Naratil (born 1961) took on the role of COO on top of his then current duties.

== Mandates ==
Ulrich Körner is chairman of the Widder Hotel in Zurich and vice president of the board of Lyceum Alpinum Zuoz. He is also deputy chairman of the supervisory board of UBS Deutschland AG, a member of the Board of Directors of OOO UBS Bank Russia, chairman of the Foundation Board of the UBS Pension Fund, a member of the Financial Service Chapter Board of the Swiss-American Chamber of Commerce, a member of the advisory board of the Department of Banking and Finance at the University of Zurich and a member of the business advisory council of the Laureus Foundation Switzerland. He formerly served on the board of Winterthur Group, AXA Leben AG, and AXA Versicherungen AG and as a member of the Board of Clariden Leu AG as well as of the Bank Leu AG. He is also the former vice-chairman of the committee of the governing board of the Swiss Bankers Association. As a UBS representative in the Swiss Expert Commission, he advised Swiss politicians on both the resolvability of the large banks and the future strategy of Switzerland's financial industry. He has been appointed as the CEO of Credit Suisse in July 2022 after Thomas Gottstein resigned from the position.

== Personal life ==
Körner was born in Germany in 1962 and has both German and Swiss citizenship. He is married with two daughters and a son.
