= Robert L. Genillard =

Swiss businessman (1929–2016)

Robert L. Genillard (15 June 1929 – 18 September 2016) was a Swiss businessman. His activities spanned both the fields of finance and industry. After graduate studies in economics and finance, he started a financial career in New York City. In 1954, he joined White Weld & Co., one of the oldest and leading American investment banking firms, acquired by Merrill Lynch in 1977. He became a general partner of White, Weld & Co. in 1958 and a member of its management committee in 1964. He moved to Europe to establish in the early 1960s, as chairman and chief executive, the firm of Credit Suisse White Weld which was to become Credit Suisse First Boston.

Genillard was born in Lausanne in 1929. He is regarded as one of the main architects and developers of the Eurocapital market (Eurobond) in which the firm he led played a dominant role. His professional writings and accomplishments have been widely published.

He forecast that the Eurobond market would become the supranational capital market. This was again demonstrated in 2016 when an international syndicate of banks floated a $42 billion issue of bonds for Anheuser-Bush InBev.

During the last twenty years, Genillard has also been quite active in industry, notably with ties to the Thyssen-Bornemisza Group, an industrial employing some 20,000 people worldwide at the time, having led the parent company, TBG Holdings N.V. as its chief executive from 1977 to 1983, and having served as deputy chairman of its supervisory board between 1971 and 1994.

Since 1983, his principal activity has been as an independent corporate director and investor. He has served as a director or advisor on the boards of various companies of international significance, among which Alusuisse (vice-chairman), American Express Company, Cabot Corporation International Board, Clariden Bank (later Clariden Leu) (founder-chairman – honorary chairman), Compagnie des Machines Bull, Credit Suisse Group (vice-chairman), Credit Suisse[2] (vice-chairman), Credit Suisse First Boston (vice-chairman), Corning Inc. (now director emeritus), Honeywell International, Novartis, and Société des bains de mer de Monaco (SBM).

Geinllard died on 18 September 2016 at the age of 87.

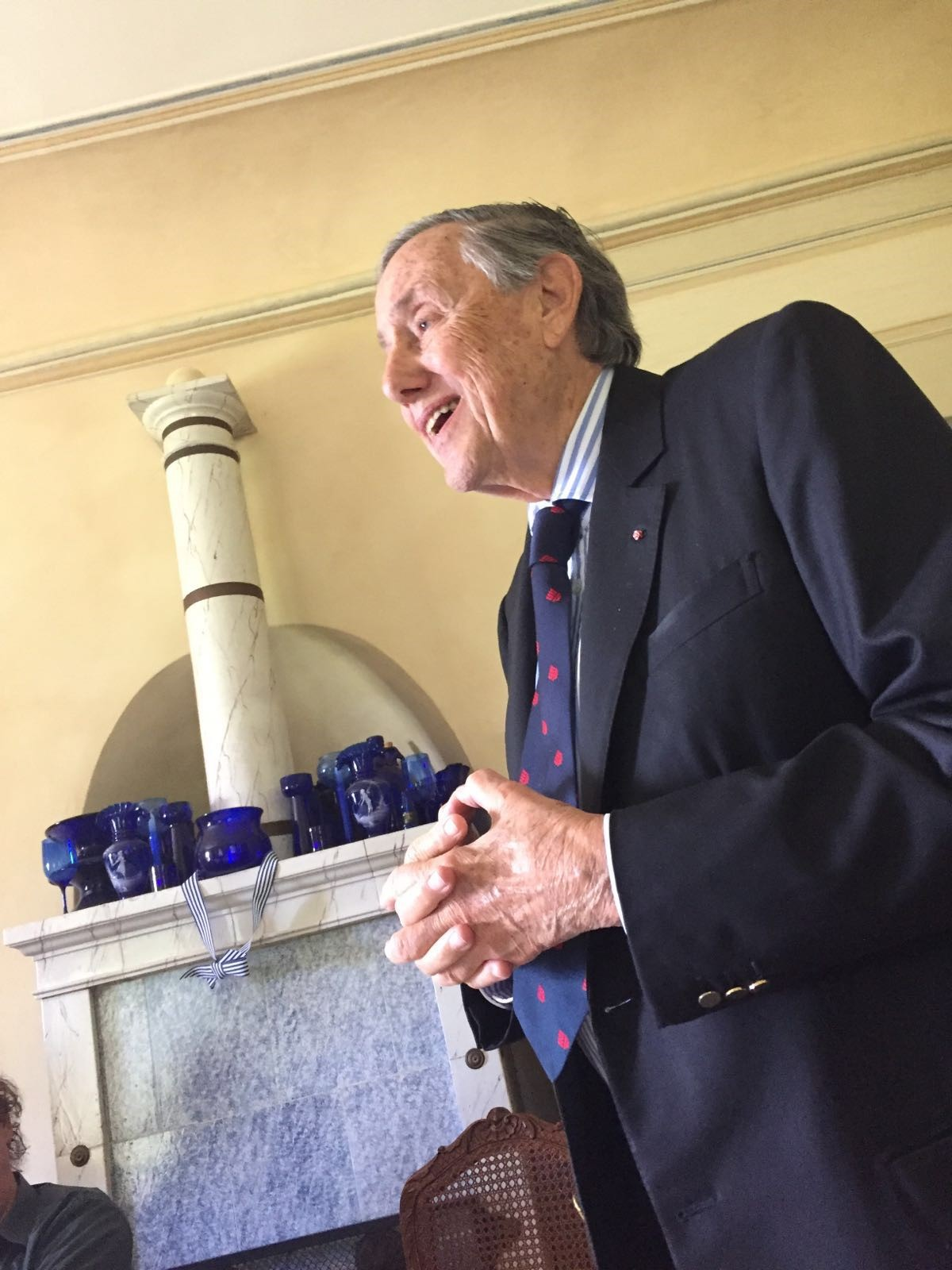
Delivering a speech, photo S. Genillard
