= White Weld & Co. =

Privately held global financial services firm engaged in asset management

White, Weld & Co.
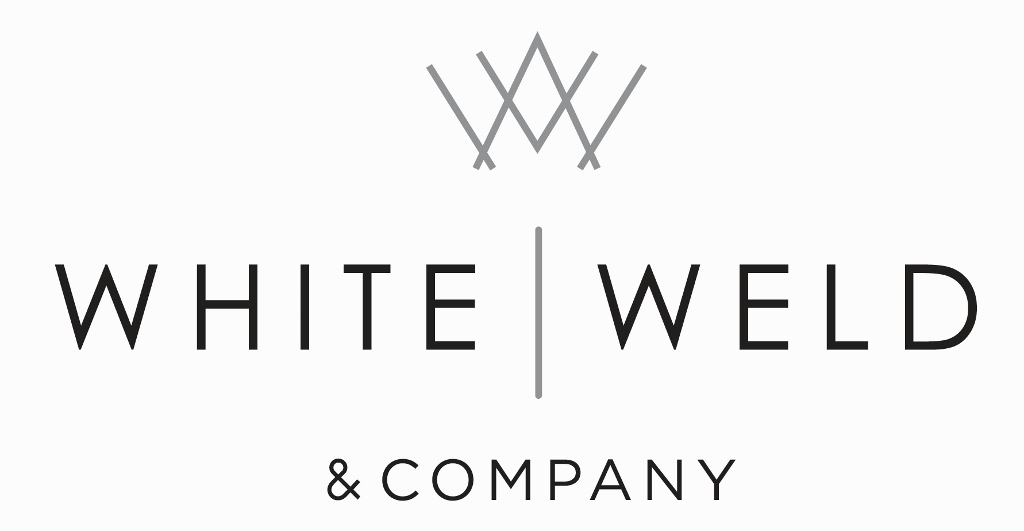
- Type: Privately held company
- Industry: Diversified Financial Services
- Founded: 1895; 131 years ago; 1978; 48 years ago, sold to Merrill Lynch; 2012; 14 years ago, Relaunched
- Headquarters: Chicago, Illinois, U.S.
- Area served: Worldwide
- Services: Investment management, Investment banking, Capital markets
- Website: www.whiteweldco.com

White, Weld & Co. is a privately held global financial services firm engaged in asset management, investment advisory, investment banking and other capital market activities. Relaunched in 2012, the business is headquartered in Chicago. Previously, White, Weld & Co. was a Boston-based investment bank, historically managed by Boston Brahmins until its sale to Merrill Lynch in 1978. The Weld family name can be traced back to the founding of Massachusetts in the 1630s.

== History ==
White, Weld & Co. was founded in Boston in the nineteenth century, originally to finance overseas trade. In 1929 it managed Airstocks, a short-lived venture but important because it was an early financial concern exclusively pertaining to airlines and aviation. It developed into a small, well-connected New York investment bank by the twentieth century and a bastion of the WASP establishment. For example, George Herbert Walker Jr., uncle of the first President Bush, became an executive of White, Weld when his firm G. H. Walker & Co. was bought by them in 1974. Paul Hallingby was CEO, Nigel S. MacEwan was President, and Charles J. Fuhrmann II, Steve Hammerman, Harold Janeway, Charles C. Lee, Roberts W. Brokaw III, and George G. Montgomery Jr. were Senior Vice Presidents when the company was sold to Merrill Lynch. As stock markets became more retail-oriented and investment banking became more capital intensive, the firm decided it could not compete and put itself up for sale. One of the firm's most prominent transactions in its final period was the IPO of Walmart in 1970 with Stephens Inc.

=== Relationship with Credit Suisse ===
One of its most successful ventures was an international investment banking partnership founded in 1970 by Robert L. Genillard as a Managing Partner of White, Weld & Co, with Credit Suisse, called Société Anonyme du Credit Suisse et de White Weld – or Credit Suisse White Weld. Sir John Craven, later head of Morgan Grenfell, led Credit Suisse White Weld from 1975 to 1978. Furthermore, Oswald Gruebel, Credit Suisse chief from 2004 to 2007, began his career in 1970 at Credit Suisse White Weld. When White Weld was purchased by Merrill Lynch, it left the partnership with Credit Suisse and was replaced by First Boston thus creating the Credit Suisse First Boston business in London. The Swiss private banking division of White Weld, founded in 1954 as White Weld & Co. AG, became Clariden Leu. In 1962, SKA takes over White, Weld and Co AG in Zurich from U.S. investment bank White Weld, and renames it Clariden Finanz AG.
