= Albert Dufour-Féronce =

German businessman (1798–1861)

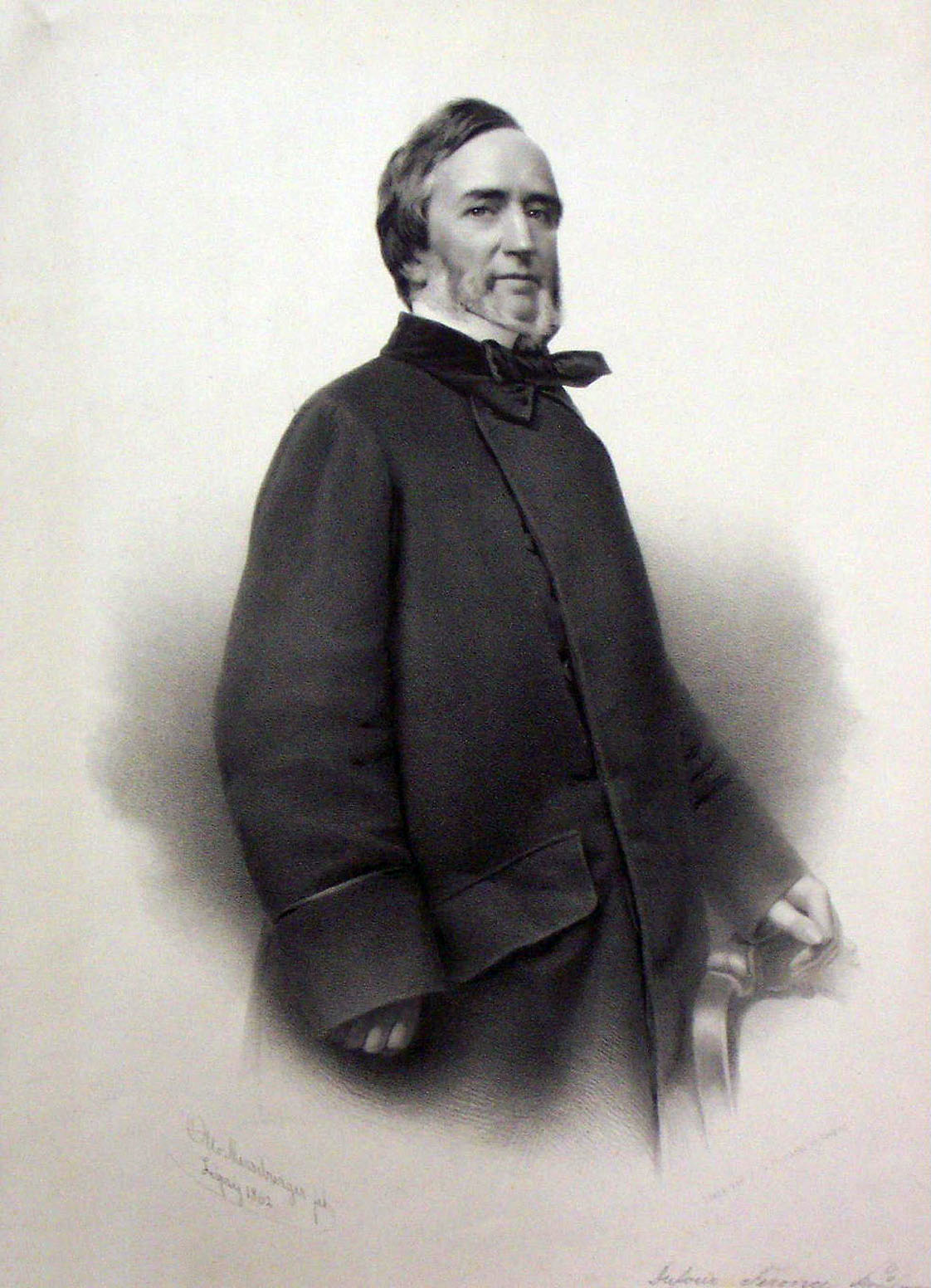

Personal details
- Born: Jean Marc Albert Dufour-Féronce

Freiherr Albert Johann Markus Dufour-Féronce also Jean Marc Albert Dufour-Feroncé (20 December 1798 – 12 November 1861) was a German businessman, banker, railway pioneer and politician.

Born into an affluent silk merchant family in Leipzig of Huguenot descent, Dufour-Féronce was involved in the founding of several notable companies, such as the Leipzig-Dresden Railway Company and Credit Suisse, and held participations in the Suez Company and served as an agent to Österreichischer Lloyd.

From 1848 to 1850, Dufour-Féronce served on the Landtag of Saxony for the Leipzig districts 22, 23 and 24 constituency. He also served as General Consul of Portugal and previously as member of the city council from 1840 to 1846.

== Personal life ==
In 1831, Dufour-Féronce married firstly Johanna Maria Caroline von Lindemann (1815–1888), with whom he had two sons and two daughters;

- Pauline Louise Helene Dufour-Feroncé (1831–1833)
- Pauline Armgard Gertrud Dufour-Feroncé (1834–1913), married Johann Heinrich Demiani, a Leipzig merchant, two children including Hans Demiani.
- Ferdinand Albert Dufour-Feroncé (1835–1889), married Maria Victoria Lampe (1844–1896), established himself as a merchant in London with his brother. They had four children, including Albert Dufour von Féronce.
- Paul Oswald Dufour-Feroncé (1836–1908), married Sophie Adolphine Demiani (1842–1921), established himself as merchant in London with his brother. They had three children.
- Maria Anna Elisabeth Dufour-Feroncé (1839–)

Dufour-Féronce died in London, England on 12 November 1861 aged 62.

Since 1794, the primary residence of the family was Romanus House in Leipzig.
