= Airstocks =

Aviation investment firm, 1929–1930

Airstocks, Inc. (1929 - 1930) was an aviation investment firm which was short-lived because of poor financial conditions during the Great Depression. Founded in New York City in 1929, the business liquidated its assets in February 1930. It is important because it was an early financial concern exclusively pertaining to airlines and aviation.

The company was managed by White, Weld & Company, investment bankers, who were located in the tower of the Manhattan Company Building, 40 Wall Street (Manhattan). White, Weld & Company leased two and one-half floors in the edifice which was nearly completed in January 1930. Before mid April 1930 they were located in offices at 14 Wall Street.

Major Leslie MacDill, formerly head of the procurement section of the material division of the air corps, and commanding officer of Wright Field, in Dayton, Ohio, joined the staff of Airstocks, Inc., on August 1, 1929.

In December 1929 the corporation had assets of $4,235,598. The liquidating value of its capital stock was $46.34 per share. The trust directors voted a final liquidating dividend of $47.17, payable after March 3, 1930. Remaining cash which amounted to $4,045,358, was distributed pro rata among stockholders.
