= Dennis Levine =

American investor and white-collar criminal

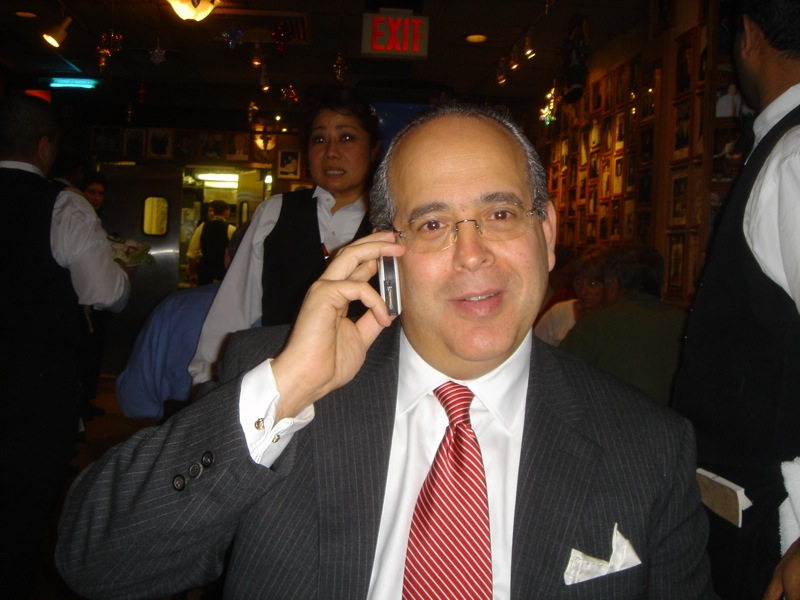
- Born: August 5, 1952 (age 74); Bayside, Queens, New York
- Education: Baruch College
- Occupation: Investment banker

Dennis B. Levine (born August 5, 1952) is a corporate consultant and former investment banker. He was a managing director at the investment banking firm Drexel Burnham Lambert in the 1980s. Levine was one of the first of several high-profile insider trading defendants in the Wall Street insider trading investigations of the mid-1980s. As a result of the investigation by and subsequent proceedings, Levine pleaded guilty.

== Early life ==
Levine grew up in a middle-class Jewish family in Bayside in eastern Queens. He graduated from CUNY's Baruch College, obtaining an MBA from the same college in 1976.

== Career ==
After being hired away from his career at Citibank in 1978, he joined Smith Barney's corporate finance department and worked in its Paris office specializing in mergers and acquisitions. He moved to Lehman Brothers in 1981. Shortly after Lehman was bought by American Express in 1985, Levine moved to Drexel as a managing director.

Levine spent most of his career as a specialist in mergers and acquisitions. It was very common to see him on a telephone with an extra-long cord while hunched over a Quotron, checking out signs of possible deals. He participated in many transactions throughout his career, three of which were among the more notable hostile takeovers of the 1980s — James Goldsmith's takeover of Crown Zellerbach, Coastal Corporation's takeover of American Natural Resources, and Ron Perelman's takeover of Revlon.

In 1991, CBS 60 Minutes reported that Levine was involved in advanced fee scams. This was further investigated by The New York Times' and Los Angeles Times. Levine was working with people that he had met in prison and alleged members of the New York Mafia to con real estate developers out of their money by providing "introductions" to phony overseas banks and other con men. Information about these further crimes and his original conviction has resulted in various Wikipedia wars in the past, as anonymous edits routinely try to scrub Levine's Wikipedia page, only to have the more accurate information reinserted and the page locked for vandalism.

== Insider trading ==
Over the years, Levine built a network of professionals at various Wall Street firms. Participants exchanged and traded on information that they obtained through their work. Levine placed his trades through an account maintained under an assumed name at Bahamian subsidiaries of Swiss banks, using pay phones to prevent his calls from being traced. After briefly doing business with Pictet & Cie, he moved his business to Bank Leu in May 1980, eventually earning $10.6 million in profits. Like most Swiss banks, Bank Leu had a long tradition of secrecy. Additionally, the Bahamas had some of the strictest bank secrecy laws in the world; with few exceptions, Bahamian banks were barred from disclosing any information about a customer's banking relationship to a third party.

Some Bank Leu officials soon began to copy, or "piggyback", Levine's trades for their own accounts. In the process, they too profited from Levine's trades. To cover the trail, they broke up Levine's trades among several brokers. Unfortunately for Levine, they steered a large number of his trades through a broker at Merrill Lynch, who also began piggybacking the trades for himself.

In May 1985, Merrill Lynch detected suspicious activity in that and two other brokers' personal trading accounts. An internal investigation led to Bank Leu. Unable to pierce the veil of secrecy, Merrill Lynch forwarded the affair to the U.S. Securities and Exchange Commission (SEC). Bank officials suggested that Levine come up with reasons to justify the trades. However, they also forged or destroyed many documents related to Levine's activity — thus opening themselves to charges of obstruction of justice. Their story fell apart when the noted attorney Harvey Pitt, whom the bank had retained, noticed a huge gap between the actual statements of the bank's managed accounts and the omnibus records. At that point, the bank decided to co-operate with the SEC.

The Bahamian Attorney General, Paul Adderly, issued an opinion that stock trading was separate from banking. Therefore, since Bank Leu did not have a "banking relationship" with Levine, any disclosure about him would not violate Bahamian banking law. The bank was thus free to reveal Levine's name and he was arrested soon afterward. At the same time, he was sued by the SEC.

On June 5, 1986, Levine was forced to plead guilty to securities fraud, tax evasion and perjury. Like all of the defendants charged, he agreed to co-operate with the government investigation to expose the other members of his group. Levine also settled the SEC's charges, agreeing to disgorge $11.5 million—at the time, the largest such penalty in SEC history. He also agreed to a lifetime ban from the securities industry. Levine also agreed to pay $2 million in back taxes out of the amount he disgorged to the SEC.

Subsequently, Levine directly implicated powerful arbitrageur Ivan Boesky, and information from the Boesky case also implicated another prominent player in the mergers and acquisitions circle, Martin Siegel. Both Boesky and Siegel subsequently pleaded guilty. Due in part to this co-operation, federal judge Gerald Goettel imposed a lenient sentence of two years in prison and a $362,000 fine. However, since Levine had been stripped of nearly all of his liquid assets by the SEC and IRS, Goettel did not "commit" the fines, meaning that he would not be held in contempt of court if he left prison without paying them. At sentencing, Goettel said that Levine had helped expose "a nest of vipers on Wall Street", of which Levine himself had been a part.

Levine said that after his arrest, he seriously considered fighting the charges. He claimed that the government circumvented Bahamian law in order to obtain most of the evidence against him (even though he was guilty), including records of his phone calls. However, he said, the possibility of additional charges in a superseding indictment—possibly including the powerful Racketeer Influenced and Corrupt Organizations Act — and concern about the effects on his family led him to conclude this was a battle he could not win. Levine recalled that his lawyer, Arthur Liman, told him that if he went to trial, he faced up to 20 years in prison if found guilty and the loss of everything he owned.

The SEC and the US Attorney's office conducted investigations that soon extended well beyond Levine's trading group. There seemed to be an entire web of relationships among Wall Street professionals exchanging information and other favors, including the parking of stock, the accumulation of stock to pressure a firm's management and stock price, all unrelated to Levine. Well known market participants were soon caught up in the investigations, including Siegel, Boesky and the powerful Goldman Sachs senior partner and head of arbitrage Robert Freeman. The investigations also indirectly led to Michael Milken who was highly influential in the junk bond market at the time. In 1991, Levine wrote the book Inside Out—an Insiders Account of Wall Street..
