= Swiss Volksbank =

Former Swiss bank

- Native name: Schweizerische Volksbank
- Formerly: Volksbank in Bern
- Type: Cooperative
- Industry: Banking
- Founded: 1869
- Fate: Taken over by CS Holding (1993)
- Headquarters: Bern, Switzerland
- Net income: CHF 110.8 million (1990)
- Total assets: CHF 44.606 billion (1990)
- Number of employees: 6,355 (1990)

Swiss Volksbank (German: Schweizerische Volksbank, SVB; French: Banque populaire suisse, BPS; Italian: Banca popolare svizzera) was a Swiss cooperative bank. Founded in Bern in 1869 as the Volksbank in Bern, it had become the second-largest bank in Switzerland by 1930. It nearly collapsed in 1933, recovered slowly after 1945, and was taken over in 1993 by CS Holding, later the Credit Suisse Group.

== History ==
The SVB was founded in 1869 under the name Volksbank in Bern ("People's Bank in Bern") by representatives of workers, civil servants and tradespeople. Following the model of the German Vorschuss- und Kreditvereine (loan and credit associations), the statutory purpose of the cooperative was to promote general prosperity, and that of its members in particular. The SVB was originally intended to grant loans only to its members, but soon after its founding it also lent to non-members and extended its activities to all kinds of banking business. It grew rapidly in the 1870s and opened several branches inside and outside the canton of Bern. In 1881 it changed its name to Schweizerische Volksbank.

After setbacks during the growth crisis of the 1880s, its business expanded strongly from the mid-1890s. The SVB came through World War I without significant difficulties. By 1930 it had become the second-largest bank in Switzerland, with total assets of 1.684 billion francs, a net profit of 10.6 million francs and 1,639 employees in that year. During the Great Depression, however, it got into difficulties, and in the autumn of 1933 it was on the verge of collapse. The Swiss Confederation then took a stake of 100 million francs in the cooperative capital, which subsequently had to be halved twice. In 1936 the bank wound up almost all of its foreign business at a loss.

Only after 1945 did the SVB begin a slow recovery. The 1960s were a period of strong growth; in 1970 the bank had total assets of 6.591 billion francs, a net profit of 34.1 million francs and 3,500 employees. From 1975 the SVB revived its foreign activities by founding a subsidiary in Luxembourg. In the early 1980s it made headlines with heavy losses on silver futures. The write-downs that the real estate crisis of the early 1990s forced on the SVB ate into its capital and led in 1993 to the takeover of the bank by CS Holding, later the Credit Suisse Group. In 1990 the SVB had total assets of 44.606 billion francs, a net profit of 110.8 million francs and 6,355 employees.

== Bibliography ==
- 100 Jahre Schweizerische Volksbank, 1969
- Handbook on the History of European Banks, 1994
