= Chiasso scandal =

1977 financial affair in Switzerland

The Chiasso scandal (German: Der Fall Chiasso) was a financial affair that broke out in the spring of 1977 in Switzerland against a branch of Credit Suisse.

== Background ==
In the 1960s, three executives of Credit Suisse (then Schweizerische Kreditanstalt), including the deputy manager of the Chiasso branch, Ernst Kuhrmeier, set up a Liechtenstein shell company called "Texon" without the knowledge of their management. The front was used for many years to illegally launder money from Italy.

It took several years for the bank's Zurich management to react, despite an initial alert in 1968 following a complaint by a UBS manager about the methods employed by Credit Suisse employees; not only was no action taken, but Ernst Kuhrmeier was even appointed Senior Director in January 1975.

It wasn't until 1977 that the scandal broke: in the wake of the first oil crisis, several companies managed by Texon became loss-making, and the whole financial package collapsed, revealing a debt of 2.2 billion Swiss francs for Credit Suisse. On 24 April 1977, Kuhrmeier and two bank directors were put under arrest. Faced with the risk of financial panic, the Swiss National Bank offered a bridge loan of three billion Swiss francs; this offer, however, was rejected by the bank's management.

== Consequences ==
Kuhrmeier died shortly before his first court appearance. On July 3, 1979, the defendants were sentenced to four and a half years in prison and a fine of 10,000 Swiss francs. In the wake of this scandal, Crédit Suisse would need several years to rebuild its reputation.

=== Banking regulation ===
On a national level, the scandal revealed the flaws in the Swiss banking system and forced banks to admit that they had to demand proof of their customers' identity; the tangible result was the 1977 signing, by members of the Swiss Bankers Association and the Swiss National Bank of the "Agreement on the Swiss banks' code of conduct with regard to the exercise of due diligence".

=== Popular initiative ===
On the political front, the Swiss Socialist Party launched a popular initiative "Against the abuse of banking secrecy and the power of the banks", aimed at combating tax fraud. The Federal Council admitted that foreign capital created issues but asserted that regular banking regulation was best suited to handle them rather than a constitutional amendment: it therefore recommended that the initiative be rejected. Willy Ritschard, one of the two Socialist Federal Councillors and acting minister of finance, was granted the right to abstain from defending the council's decision (the other socialist councillor, Pierre Aubert, could only abstain from television appearances). The initiative was rejected on May 20, 1984, by 73% of voters.

=== In Ticino ===
Fabio Vassalli, President of the Council of State of the Canton of Ticino, elected in 1975 on the Christian Democratic Party list, was forced to resign on June 19, 1977. Fabio Vassalli had previously been a partner in the Maspoli & Noseda law firm and was directly involved in Texon's business with Credit Suisse in Chiasso. National Councillor Jean Ziegler had intervened with the Federal Council a few days earlier to find out about Fabio Vassalli's involvement, who subsequently issued an official statement denying having had any dealings with Texon. A few days later, following a question from the socialist deputy Storelli on Fabio Vassalli's tax situation, the tax authorities discovered that Fabio Vassalli had allegedly received considerable sums from Texon without declaring them to the tax authorities.

On May 29, 1979, on the second day of the Credit Suisse trial, the Croci-Torti case came to the fore. Luigi Croci-Torti, a smuggler, had opened several accounts with Credit Suisse in Chiasso as early as the 1970s, and it turned out that Fabio Vassalli had been the director of many of Luigi Croci-Torti's companies and that a bond of friendship existed between them.
