= Bank Leu =

Swiss private bank

Bank Leu AG

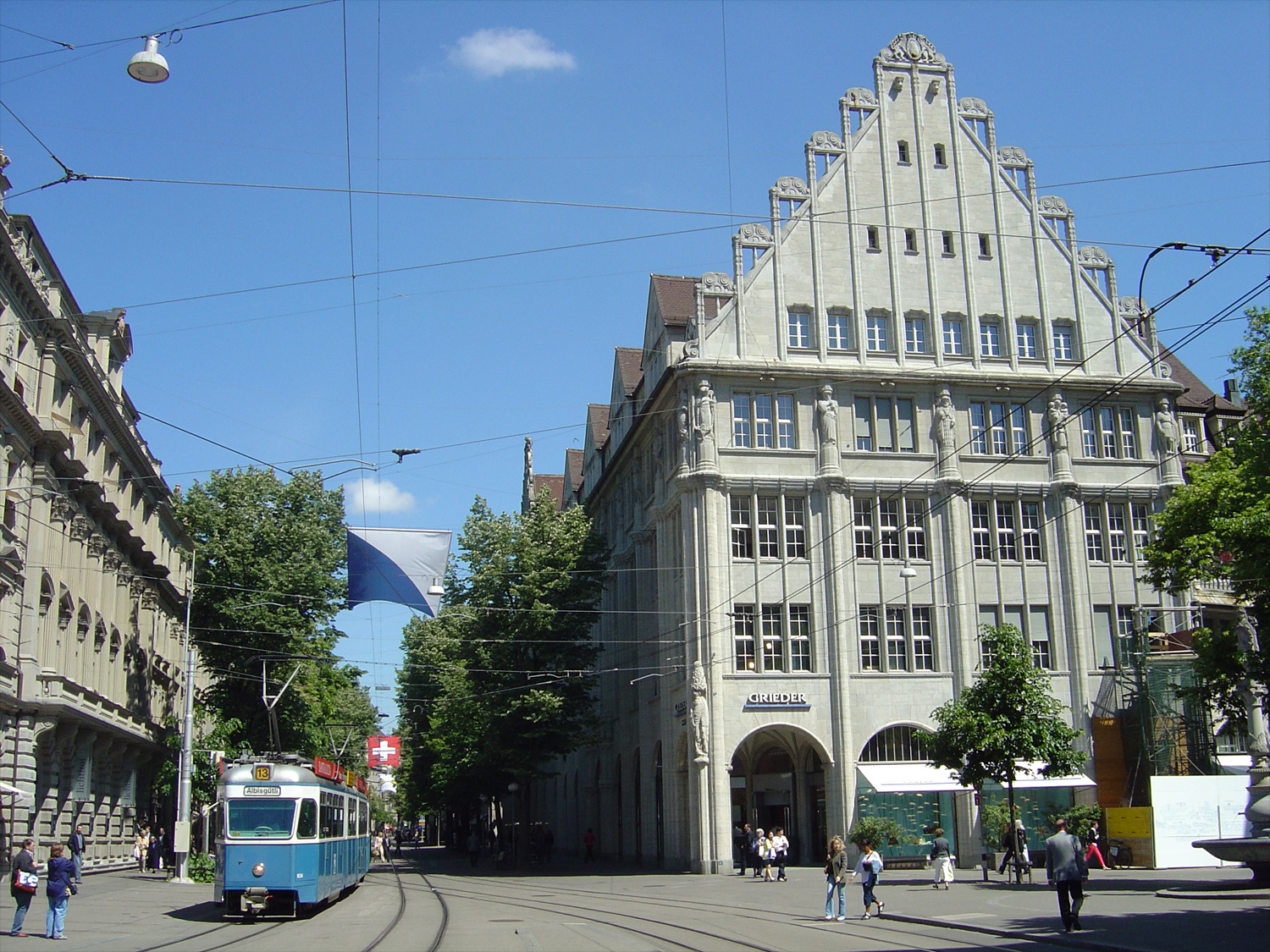
- Leu's former headquarters in Zürich, Switzerland
- Industry: Private banking
- Founded: 1755; 271 years ago
- Defunct: 2007
- Fate: Merged into Credit Suisse
- Successor: Clariden Leu
- Headquarters: Zürich, Switzerland
- Website: www.leu.com (defunct)

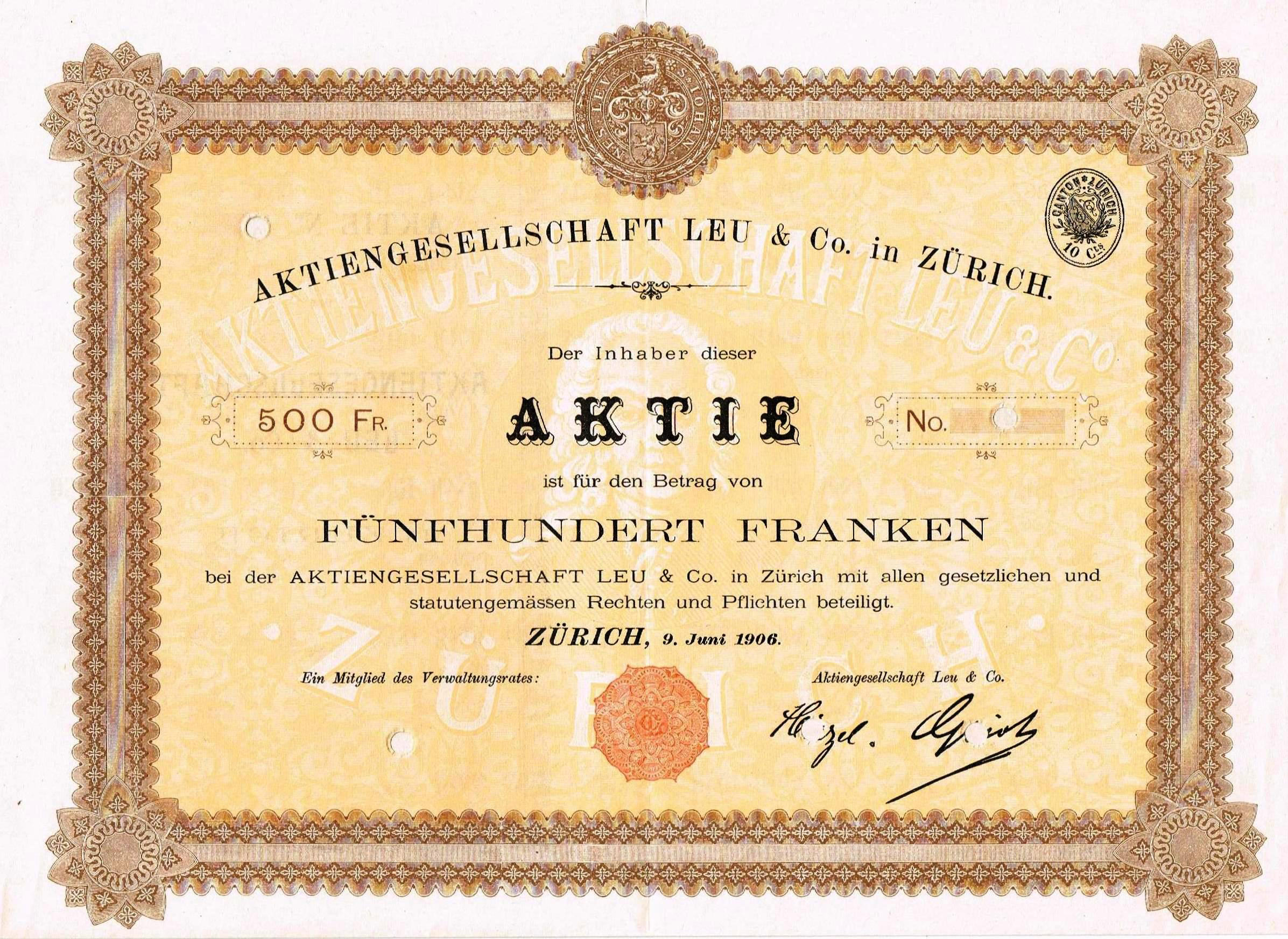
Share of the AG Leu & Co., issued 9. June 1906

Bank Leu AG (/lɔɪ/; LOY; formerly Leu et Compagnie respectively Leu & Co.) was a Swiss private bank which was headquartered in Zürich, Switzerland. Since 1990 it operated as subsidiary of Credit Suisse and has been the oldest Swiss bank. In 2007, Leu merged with other private banking units, to form Clariden Leu. The bank's reputation was damaged by its involvement in two major financial scandals in the 1980s, which ultimately led to its merger with Credit Suisse.

== History ==
The bank was founded in 1758 as Leu et Compagnie, named after its founder, Johann Jacob Leu, who later became mayor of Zürich. Originally a state-owned bank, it was privatized in 1798 after Napoleon conquered Switzerland; the bank's officials did not want its assets to be taken over by Napoleon's new client state, the Helvetic Republic. In 1854, it incorporated as Leu & Co. after more than a century as a limited partnership. It became a public limited company (German: Aktiengesellschaft) in 1969.

Despite having many distinguished customers over the years (at one point, it was Maria Theresa's banker), two major scandals in the 1980s eventually cost the bank its independence.

== U.S. insider trading scandal ==
Bank Leu's Bahamian subsidiary, Bank Leu International, was used by Dennis Levine to handle most of his insider trades. From 1981 to 1986, Levine built up his account to over $10 million USD, trading on information he acquired based on his work as an investment banker.

Levine took advantage of the Bahamas' strict bank secrecy laws (which forbid the disclosure of any information about a customer's banking relationship) to cloak his activities. Bank Leu itself had a long tradition of secrecy, and its Bahamian branch had a reputation for accepting deposits from anyone, no questions asked.

However, unknown to Levine, his account manager in Nassau and several bank employees (including the bank's manager) copied several of his trades in order to make their own profits off Levine's information. This practice, called "piggybacking," was not illegal in and of itself unless the piggybacker knows or has reason to know that the trader he is copying is acting on illegally obtained information. However, Bank Leu officials knew soon after Levine opened his account that he was trading almost entirely on inside information. Even without this to consider, the practice was contrary to Bank Leu policy. As a result of their piggybacking, Bank Leu employees made a tidy profit of their own off Levine's trades.

More seriously, Bank Leu steered a large number of trades through a broker at Merrill Lynch's office in Caracas. He himself piggybacked the trades for his own benefit, and the volume led one of his colleagues to get suspicious. The colleague wrote a letter to Merrill Lynch's compliance unit, whose internal investigation led to Bank Leu. Unfortunately, the broker had by this time moved onto another company, and there was no way for Merrill Lynch to pierce the offshore veil. The matter was thus passed on to the Securities and Exchange Commission.

Bank officials suggested that Levine come up with reasons to justify the trades. However, they also forged or destroyed many documents related to Levine's activity—thus opening them to charges of obstruction of justice. Their story fell apart when noted attorney Harvey Pitt, whom the bank had retained, noticed a huge gap between the actual statements of the bank's managed accounts and the omnibus records. At that point, the bank decided to cooperate with the SEC.

Bahamian Attorney General Paul Adderly issued an opinion that stock trading was separate from normal banking transactions, and thus was not subject to the bank secrecy laws. The bank was thus free to reveal Levine's name, and he was arrested soon afterward.

Despite the bank's cooperation, Bahamian regulators forced corporate headquarters in Zürich to fire the entire board of the Bahamian branch as a condition of being allowed to stay in business in the Bahamas.

== Involvement in Distillers Company deal ==
In 1986, Guinness PLC was in the midst of a bidding war for the much larger Distillers Company. In the closing stages, Guinness' stock rose 25 percent—which was unusual, since the stock of the acquiring company usually falls in a takeover situation. Guinness paid several people and institutions, most notably American arbitrageur Ivan Boesky, about US$38 million to buy US$300 million worth of Guinness stock. The effect was to increase the value of its offer for Distillers, whose management favored merging with Guinness.

In the course of the investigation, it emerged that Bank Leu was involved in half of the purchases. Two of Guinness' directors signed under-the-table agreements in which Bank Leu subsidiaries in Zug and Lucerne bought 41 million Guinness shares. Guinness secretly promised to redeem the shares at cost, including commissions. To fulfill its end of the bargain, Guinness deposited $76 million with Bank Leu's Luxembourg subsidiary.

== Merger with Credit Suisse ==
Bank Leu's involvement in two major financial scandals seriously hurt its reputation, and in September 1990, it agreed to merge with Credit Suisse. Shortly after the merger closed, it came out that the credit officer of its Duebendorf office made fake loans in the name of legitimate clients, and then shared the proceeds with what was called "the Zürich financial underworld." The scheme cost Bank Leu an estimated 63 million CHFs (roughly US$50 million).

Bank Leu was reorganized in 1997 as an "independent private bank," integrating its branch network in Zürich as well as its corporate banking business with Credit Suisse. In 2007, it merged with Credit Suisse Fides and Credit Suisse's other three private banks—Clariden, Bank Hofmann, and Banca di Gestione Patrimoniale—to form Clariden Leu. Bank Leu AG went into private investments.

== References/external links ==
- Archives of former Bank Leu corporate site
- Levine, Dennis; William Hoffer (1991). Inside Out. New York City: G.P. Putnam's Sons. ISBN 0-399-13655-X.
- Bank Leu in the swiss corporate registry
