= Albert Dufour von Féronce =

German diplomat

Albert Dufour-Feronce (1868–1945) was a German diplomat who served in the League of Nations as one of its permanent undersecretaries.
