= Thomas Gottstein =

Swiss banker and Credit Suisse executive and former elite amateur golfere

- Born: Thomas P. Gottstein; 1964 (age 61–62); Zürich, Switzerland
- Education: University of Zurich
- Occupation: Banker
- Title: CEO, Credit Suisse
- Term: February 2020-July 2022
- Predecessor: Tidjane Thiam
- Successor: Ulrich Körner

Thomas P. Gottstein (born 1964) is a Swiss former banker. He was a member of the group executive board of Credit Suisse from October 2015 to July 2022. From February 2020 to July 2022, he was chairman of the executive board (group CEO) of Credit Suisse.

== Biography ==
Gottstein was born in 1964 in Zürich. Growing up on the left bank of Lake Zurich, Gottstein first played junior football for FC Zürich before embarking on a successful amateur golf career. Thomas Gottstein became Swiss junior champion twice, Swiss amateur champion three times and won the European junior golf team. Gottstein was a member of the Swiss national team at five consecutive World Amateur Championships (Eisenhower Trophy) from 1984-1992 and was also a member of the continental European team at the 1988 St Andrews Trophy in St Andrews, Scotland. However, Thomas Gottstein decided against a career as a professional athlete and studied business administration and economics at the University of Zurich, graduating in 1989. In 1996, he was awarded a degree in finance and accounting at the same University of Zurich.

From 1990 to 1999 he worked for the UBS in Zürich and six years in investment banking in London. In 1999, he moved to Credit Suisse's investment banking division in London. From 2007 to the end of 2009, he was Co-Head of Equity Capital Markets for the EMEA region. After 17 years in London, he moved to Zürich in January 2010 and became Head of Investment Banking Switzerland Coverage. Between 2013 and 2015, Thomas Gottstein was part of the Global Wealth Management Operating Committee as Head of Premium Clients Switzerland and Global External Asset Management. In 2015, he was promoted to CEO of the Swiss Universal Bank Division and CEO of Credit Suisse (Switzerland) Ltd of the bank.

On 7 February 2020, it was announced that Gottstein, head of the bank's Swiss domestic operations since 2015, would succeed Tidjane Thiam on 14 February 2020.

In the March days of the first coronavirus pandemic in 2020, Gottstein used his network and, together with the then Federal Councillor Ueli Maurer, FINMA and the Swiss National Bank, set up the national Covid-19 loan programme, in which 120 Swiss banks participated. Due to a certified high risk of heart attack, Thomas Gottstein decided to step down as Group CEO in July 2022. In July 2022, Gottstein resigned from his position and was replaced by Ulrich Körner.

Gottstein was a board member of SIX Swiss Exchange, and the Zurich Opera House.

Gottstein is married and has two sons.
