= Clariden Leu =

Swiss private bank

Clariden Leu AG
- Industry: Financial services
- Founded: 2007 for Clariden Leu (1973 's for Clariden and 1755 for Leu)
- Founder: Dr Alex Hoffmann & Credit Suisse Holding
- Headquarters: Zurich, Switzerland
- Key people: Peter Eckert (Chairman)
- Products: Private banking
- Total assets: 23.7 billion CHF
- Number of employees: 1800

Clariden Leu was a Swiss private bank based in Zurich and Geneva Switzerland founded in 2007 by Clariden president Alex Hoffmann and Credit Suisse Group.

Until 2007 it was operating as Clariden Bank an independent Private Bank belonging both to Credit Suisse Group and management at the bank. It was then fully merged with Credit Suisse Group in 2007 when Hoffmann retired after running the bank for almost 40 years as subsequently co-founder, CEO and President.

== History ==
In 1974, Hoffmann married his first wife Theresa Braitenberg. They had two sons: Phillippe Buri who died of cancer in 1993, and Patrick Buri born in 1972 who is an investor, political science advisor, philanthropist, investment manager and board member on several subsidiaries and companies, former partner at Lion trust asset management and billionaire chairman at Bankset Group Holding and philanthropist and graduate from Columbia University New York;

J. P. Buri was the son of the General Partner at Bank Heusser Bernard Buri, and Clariden merged with Bank Heusser Buri based in Basel to gradually acquire the four Credit Suisse private banks: Bank Leu, Bank Hofmann, and BGP Banca di Gestione Patrimoniale together with the securities dealer Credit Suisse Fides on January 26, 2007, Clariden Leu was one of the largest private banks in Switzerland and ultimately managed more than 100 billion CHF.

Robert L. Genillard was also co founder at Clariden Bank representing Credit Suisse Group.

That compares with Credit Suisse’s targets for its private banking business as a whole to add at least 6 percent of assets under management in net new money annually. Clariden Leu posted pretax earnings of 260 million francs in 2006 on revenue of 1.07 billion francs.

On November 15, 2011, Credit Suisse Group AG announced its intent to integrate its subsidiary Clariden Leu fully into Credit Suisse.

== Merger with Credit Suisse ==
Credit Suisse merged with Clariden Leu on April 2, 2012, acquiring all of Clariden Leu's assets and liabilities and assuming all of its rights and obligations. The merger made Bank Leu AG and Clariden Leu Holding AG part of Credit Suisse Group AG.
