= Credit Suisse =

Defunct Swiss multinational bank

Coordinates: 47°22′12″N 08°32′19″E

Credit Suisse Group AG

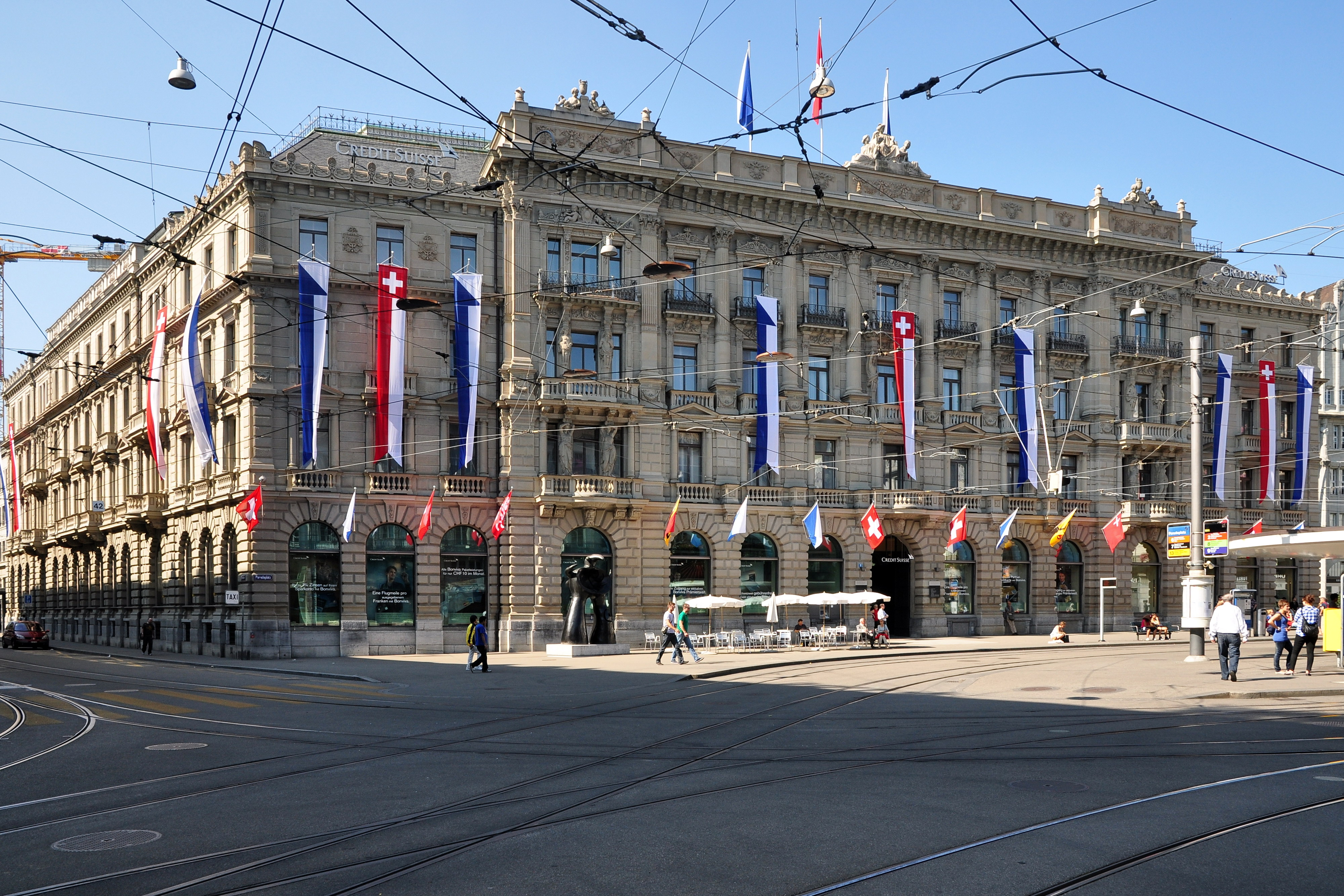
- Headquarters on Paradeplatz in Zürich, designed by architect Jakob Friedrich Wanner and inaugurated in 1876
- Formerly: Crédit Suisse/Schweizerische Kreditanstalt
- Type: Subsidiary
- ISIN: CH0012138530
- Industry: Financial services
- Founded: 5 July 1856; 170 years ago
- Founders: Albert Dufour-Féronce; Alfred Escher; Gustaf Harkort
- Defunct: 31 May 2024; 2 years ago
- Fate: Acquired by UBS to avoid bankruptcy in June 2023
- Headquarters: Zürich, Switzerland
- Area served: Worldwide
- Key people: Axel Lehmann (chairman from January 2022 to June 2023); Ulrich Körner (CEO)
- Products: Investment and private banking, asset management
- Revenue: ▼CHF 14.92 billion (2022)
- Operating income: ▼CHF −3.2 billion (2022)
- Net income: ▼CHF −7.3 billion (2022)
- AUM: ▼CHF 1.29 trillion (2022)
- Total assets: ▼CHF 531.4 billion (2022)
- Total equity: ▲CHF 45.13 billion (2022)
- Number of employees: ▲50,480 (end 2022)
- Parent: UBS Group AG
- Capital ratio: ▲14.1% (end 2022, CET1)
- Rating: S&P: BBB− Fitch: BBB; Moody's: Baa2
- Website: credit-suisse.com

Credit Suisse Group AG (French pronunciation: [kʁe.di sɥis], lit. 'Swiss Credit') was a Swiss investment bank and financial services firm founded and based in Switzerland. Headquartered in Zürich, it had offices in all major financial centres around the world and provided services in investment banking, private banking, asset management, and shared services. It was known for strict bank–client confidentiality and banking secrecy. The Financial Stability Board considered it to be a global systemically important bank. Credit Suisse was also a primary dealer and Forex counterparty of the Federal Reserve in the United States.

Credit Suisse was founded in 1856 to fund the development of Switzerland's rail system. It issued loans that helped create Switzerland's electrical grid and the European rail system. In the 1900s, it began shifting to retail banking in response to the elevation of the middle class and competition from fellow Swiss banks UBS and Julius Bär. Credit Suisse partnered with First Boston in 1978 before buying a controlling share of the bank in 1988. From 1990 to 2000, the company purchased institutions such as Winterthur Group, Swiss Volksbank, Swiss American Securities Inc. (SASI), and Bank Leu.

The company was one of the least affected banks during the 2008 financial crisis but afterwards began shrinking its investment business, executing layoffs and cutting costs. The bank was at the center of multiple international investigations for tax avoidance (such as the famous "Suisse Secrets" scandal) which culminated in a guilty plea and the forfeiture of US$2.6 billion in fines from 2008 to 2012. By the end of 2022, Credit Suisse had approximately CHF 1.3 trillion in assets under management.

On 19 March 2023, following negotiations with the Swiss government, UBS announced its intent to acquire Credit Suisse for $3.25 billion (CHF 3 billion) in order to prevent the bank's collapse. UBS completed the acquisition in June 2023. UBS intended for Credit Suisse to eventually be fully integrated, and by 31 May 2024 it was announced that Credit Suisse ceased to exist.

== History ==
=== Early history ===
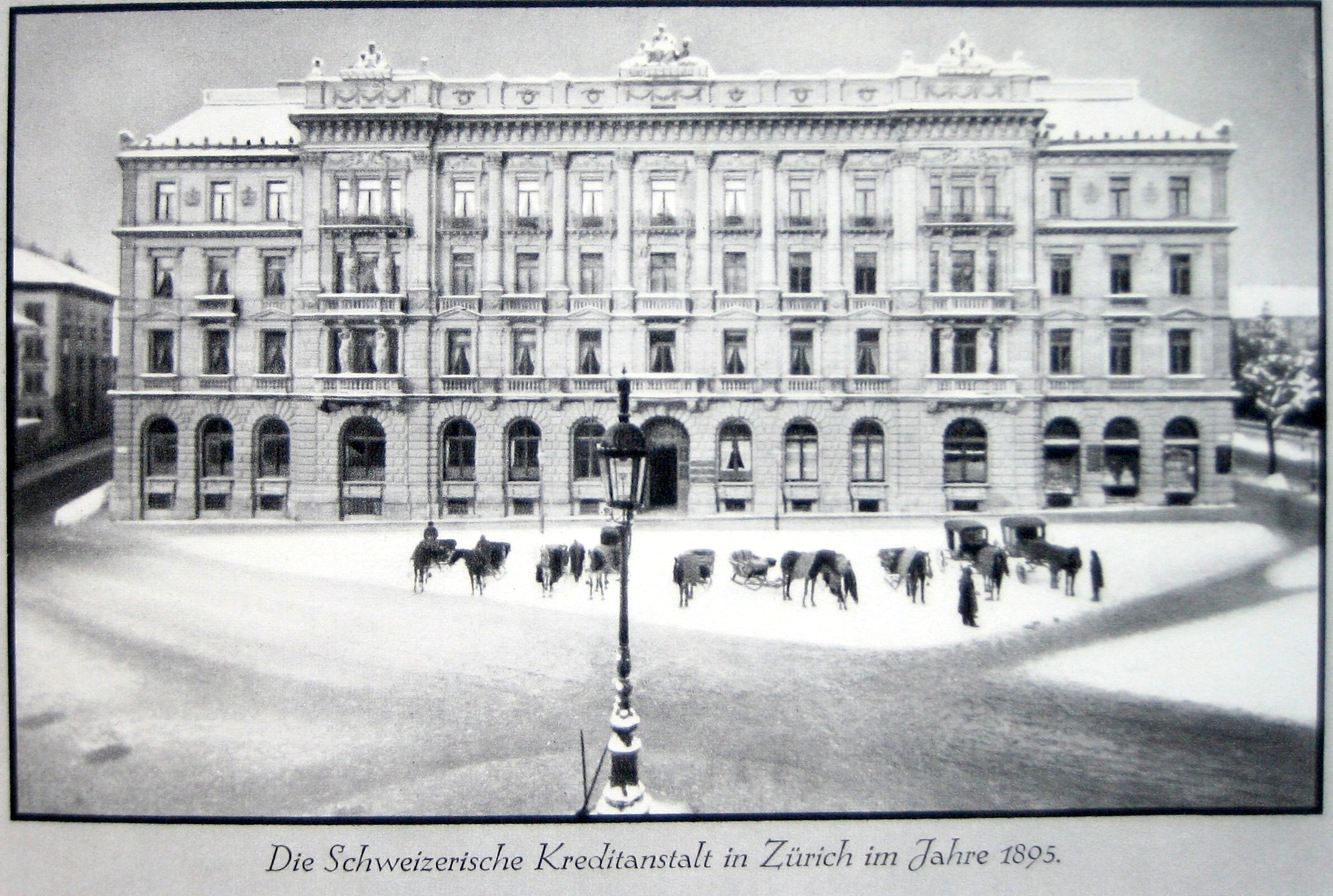
Schweizerische Kreditanstalt headquarters in 1895

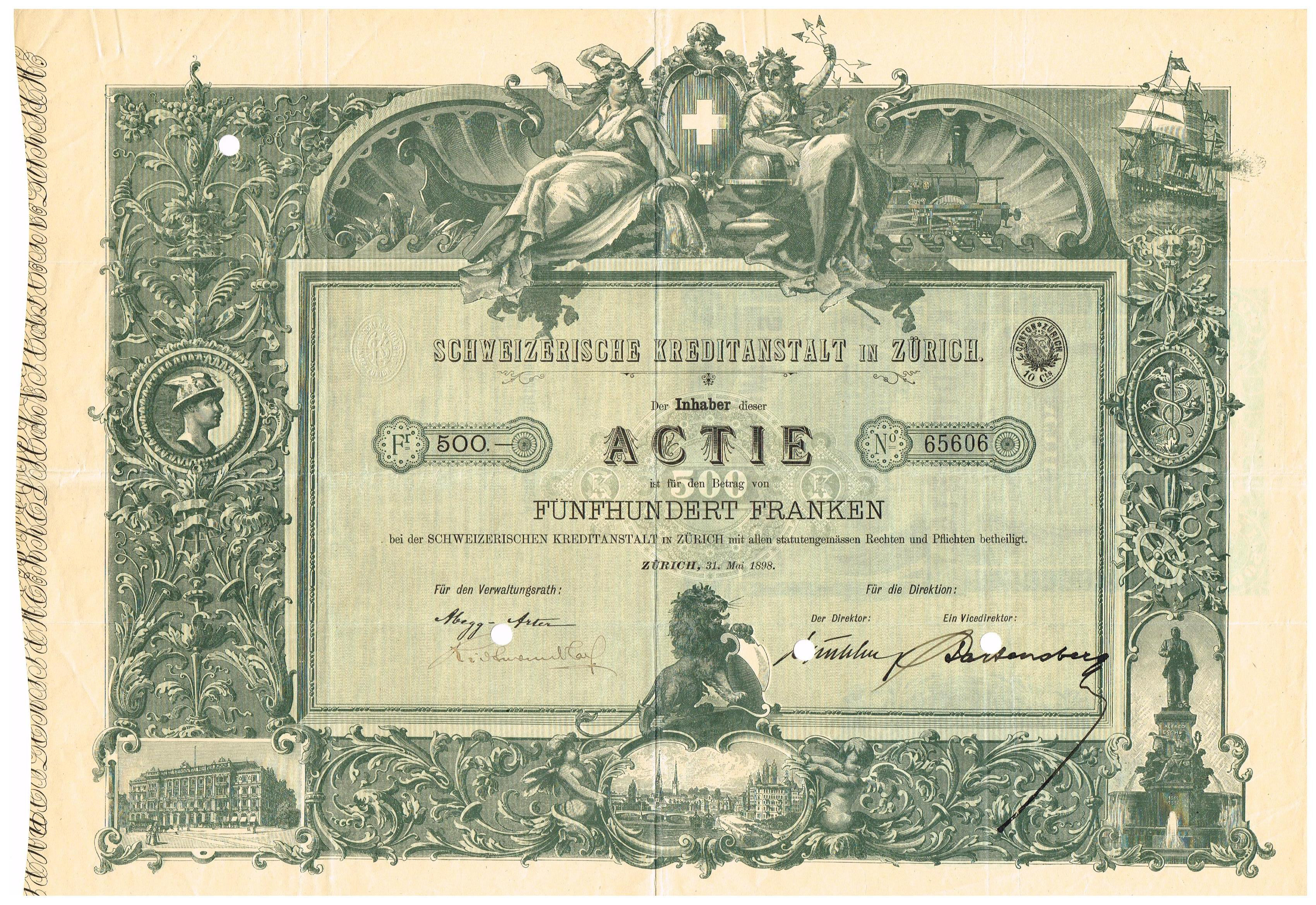
Share of the Schweizerische Kreditanstalt in Zurich, issued 31 May 1898

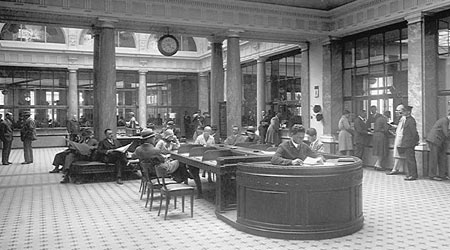
The inside of a Credit Suisse building in the 1930s

Logo in 1972

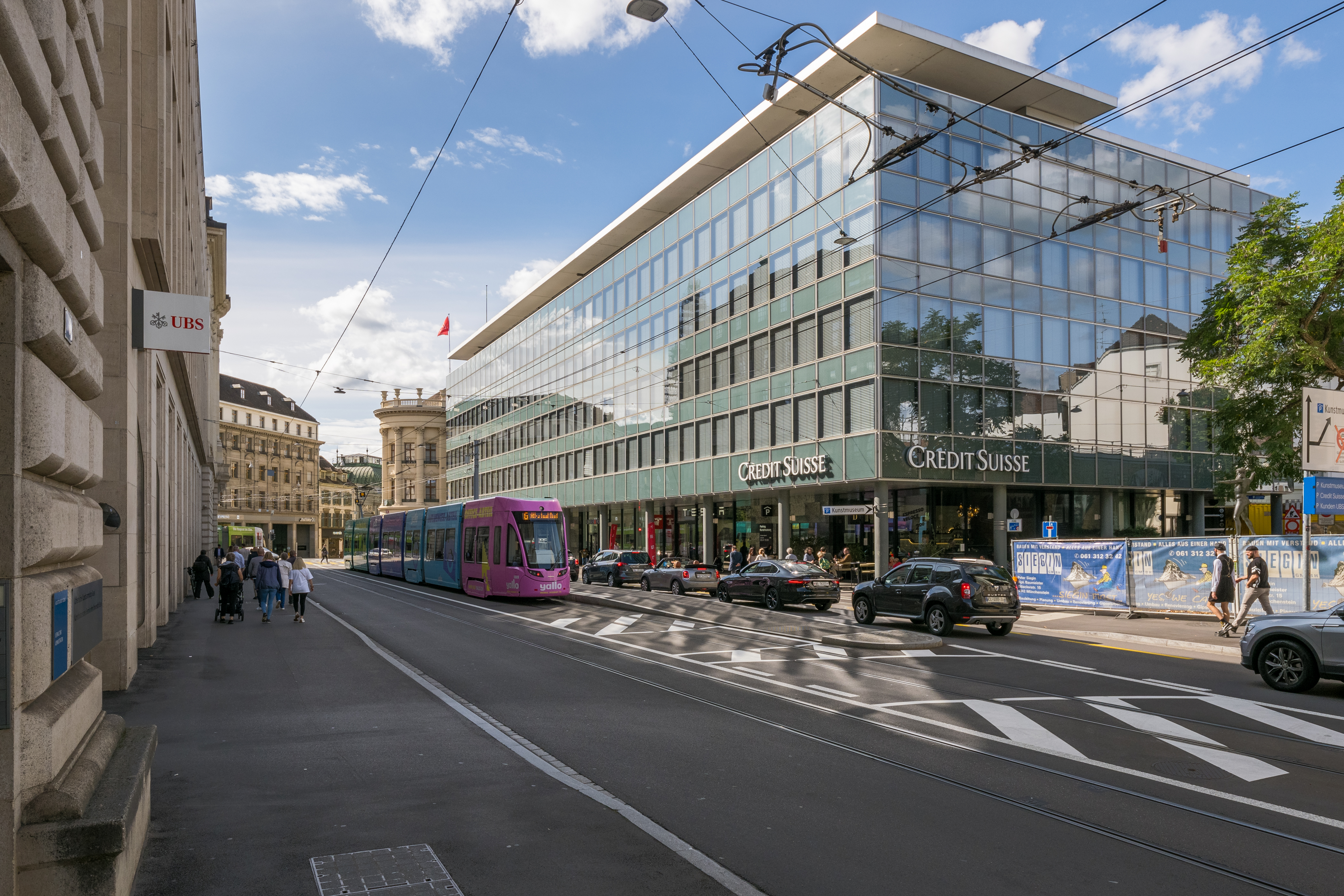
UBS and Credit Suisse at St.-Alban-Graben in Basel

Credit Suisse's founder, Alfred Escher, was called "the spiritual father of the railway law of 1852" for his work defeating the idea of a state-run railway system in Switzerland in favor of privatization. Escher founded Credit Suisse (originally called the Swiss Credit Institution, i.e., Schweizerische Kreditanstalt) jointly with Allgemeine Deutsche Credit-Anstalt on 5 July in 1856 primarily to provide domestic funding to railway projects, avoiding French banks that wanted to exert influence over the railway system. Escher aimed to start the company with three million shares and instead sold 218 million shares in three days. The bank opened on 16 July 1856 and was modeled after Crédit Mobilier, a bank funding railway projects in France that was founded two years prior, except Credit Suisse had a more conservative lending policy focused on short-to-medium-term loans. In its first year of operation, 25% of the bank's revenues were from the Swiss Northeastern Railway, which was being built by Bruno Hildebrand and Escher's company, Nordostbahn.

Credit Suisse played a substantial role in the economic development of Switzerland, helping the country develop its currency system, funding entrepreneurs and investing in the Gotthard railway, which connected Switzerland to the European rail system in 1882. Credit Suisse helped fund the creation of Switzerland's electrical grid through its participation with Elektrobank (now called Elektrowatt), a coalition of organizations that co-financed Switzerland's electrical grid. According to The Handbook on the History of European Banks, "Switzerland's young electricity industry came to assume the same importance as support for railway construction 40 years earlier." The bank also helped fund the effort to disarm and imprison French troops that crossed into Swiss borders in the 1870 Franco-Prussian War. By the end of the war, Credit Suisse had become the largest bank in Switzerland.

Throughout the late 1800s, Credit Suisse set up banking and insurance companies in Germany, Brussels, Geneva, and others (as SKA International) with the bank as a shareholder of each company. It created insurance companies like Swiss RE, Swiss Life (aka Rentenanstalt), and Schweiz. Credit Suisse had its first unprofitable year in 1886, due to losses in agriculture, venture investments, commodities, and international trade. The bank created its own sugar beet factory, bought 25,000 shares in animal breeding ventures, and supported an export business, Schweizerische Exportgesellschaft, that experienced heavy losses for over-speculative investing.

In the early 1900s Credit Suisse began catering to consumers and the middle class with deposit counters, currency exchanges, and savings accounts. The first branch outside of Zürich was opened in 1905 in Basel. The bank helped companies affected by World War I restructuring and extended loans for reconstruction efforts. During the 1920s depression, net profits and dividends were halved, and employees took salary cuts. After World War II, a substantial portion of Credit Suisse's business was in foreign reconstruction efforts. Banks subsequently acquired by Credit Suisse have been linked to bank accounts used by members of the NSDAP in the 1930s. Holocaust survivors had problems trying to retrieve assets from relatives that died in concentration camps without death certificates. This led to a class action lawsuit in 1996 that settled in 2000 for $1.25 billion. The Agreement on the Swiss Banks' Code of Conduct with Regard to the Exercise of Due Diligence was created in the 1970s, after a Credit Suisse branch in Chiasso was exposed for illegally funneling $900 million in Italian deposits to speculative investments.

=== Acquisitions, growth and First Boston ===
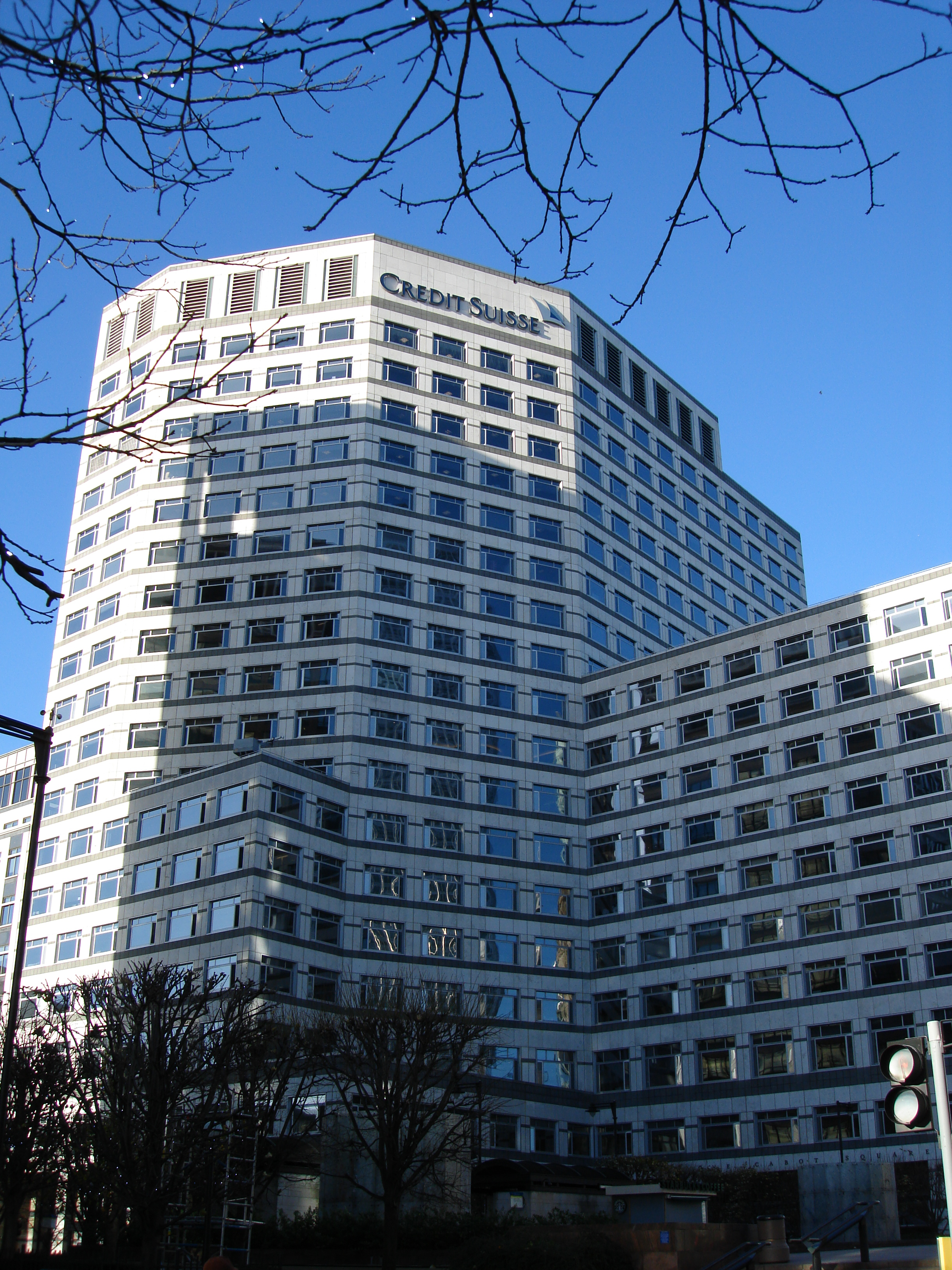
Building at 1 Cabot Square on Canary Wharf, developed by Credit Suisse First Boston for its London head office in the 1980s and inaugurated in 1991

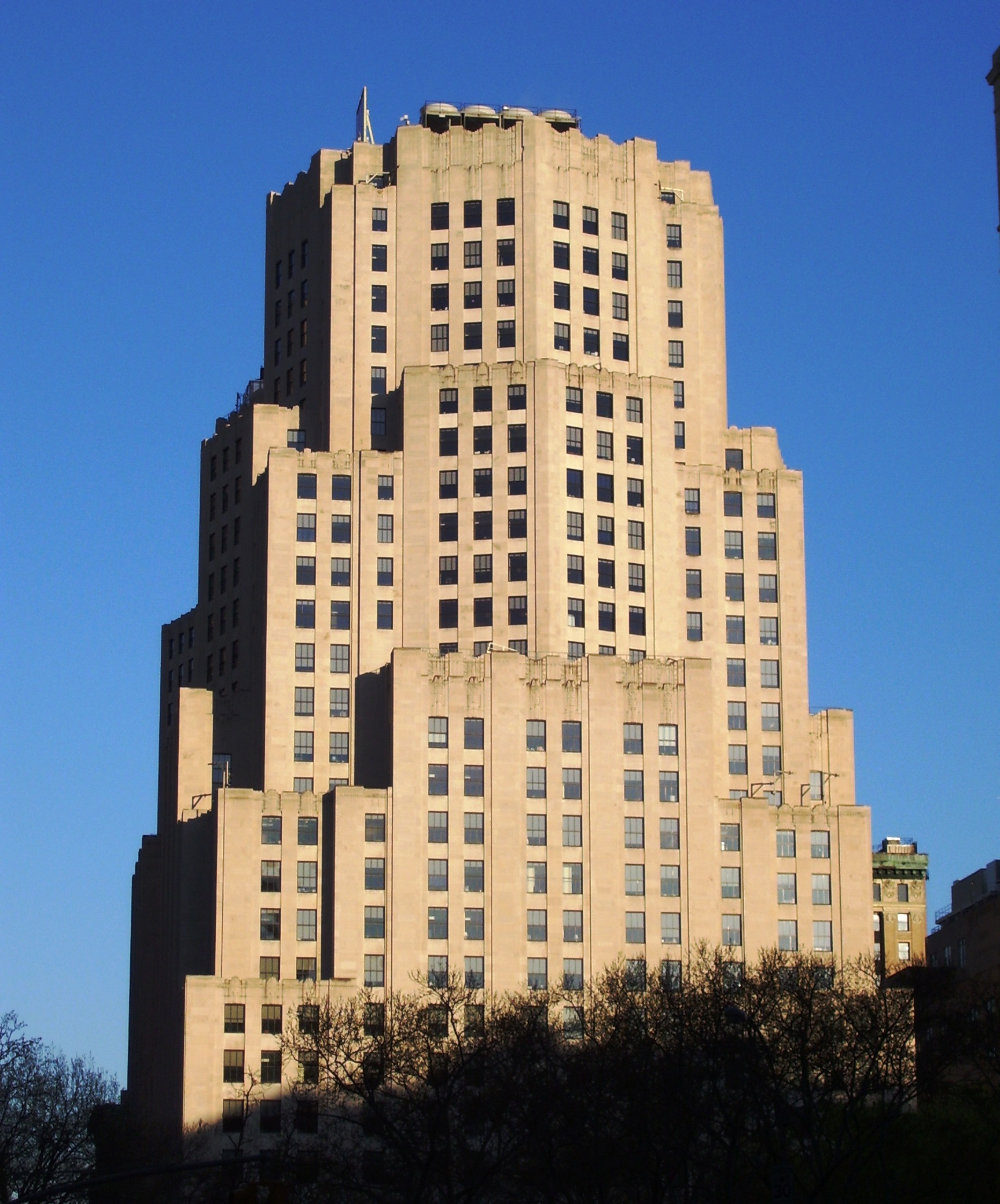
Metropolitan Life North Building on Madison Square, Credit Suisse First Boston's New York head office from the late 1990s

In 1978, White, Weld & Company dropped its partnership with Credit Suisse after it was bought by Merrill Lynch. To replace the partnership with White, Credit Suisse partnered with First Boston to create Credit Suisse First Boston in Europe and bought a 44% stake in First Boston's US operations.

In 1987, the Group acquired the blue-chip London stockbrokers Buckmaster & Moore, originally established by aristocrat Charles Armytage-Moore and sportsman Walter Buckmaster, who had met at Repton School. As stockbrokers they were very well connected and had developed a good private client business, which at one time included John Maynard Keynes.

Other Credit Suisse First Boston brands were later created in Switzerland, Asia, London, New York, and Tokyo. According to an article in The New York Times, First Boston became "the superstar of the Euromarkets" by buying stakes in American companies that wanted to issue bonds. In 1988, First Boston loaned $487 million to Gibbons and Green for the purchase of the Ohio Mattress Company, which was purchased at twenty times its annual revenue. Gibbons had also borrowed $475 million in junk bonds. When the junk bond market crashed the following year, Gibbons couldn't repay First Boston. Credit Suisse injected $725 million to keep First Boston in business, which ultimately led to the company being taken over by Credit Suisse. This became known as the "burning bed" deal, because the Federal Reserve overlooked the Glass–Steagall Act that requires separation between commercial and investment banks in order to preserve the stability of the financial markets.

In the 1990s, Credit Suisse investigated Jewish-held accounts that had been stolen by Nazis or orphaned by victims of the Holocaust. In 1996 and 1997, both the Bergier Commission and the Volcker Committee made similar inquiries. Credit Suisse, UBS, and other Swiss banks paid US$1.288 billion in settlements to 458,400 Holocaust victims and 198,000 victims of the class action lawsuit. In the 2020s, the existence of hundreds of other Nazi-tied accounts was reported.

In 1996, Credit Suisse restructured as the Credit Suisse Group with four divisions: Credit Suisse Volksbank (later called Credit Suisse Bank) for domestic banking, Credit Suisse Private Banking, Credit Suisse Asset Management, and Credit Suisse First Boston for corporate and investment banking. The restructure was expected to cost the company $800 million and result in 7,000 lost jobs but save $560 million a year. While Credit Suisse First Boston had been struggling, Credit Suisse's overall profits had grown 20% over the prior year, reaching $664 million. In 1999 Japan's Financial Supervisory Agency temporarily suspended the financial-products division's license to operate in Japan for "window dressing," the practice of selling derivatives that are often used by bank clients to hide losses.

In the late 1990s, Credit Suisse executed an aggressive acquisition strategy. The bank acquired Bank Leu, known as Switzerland's oldest bank, in 1990. In 1993 Credit Suisse outbid UBS for a controlling stake in Switzerland's fifth-largest bank, Swiss Volksbank, in a $1.1 billion deal. It also merged with Winterthur Group in 1997 for about $9 billion and acquired the asset management division of Warburg, Pincus & Co. in 1999 for $650 million. Donaldson, Lufkin & Jenrette was purchased for $11.5 billion in 2000.

In the 2000s, Credit Suisse executed a series of restructures. In 2002 the bank was consolidated into two entities: Credit Suisse First Boston for investments and Credit Suisse Financial Services. A third unit was added in 2004 for insurance. Credit Suisse restructured again in 2004 under what it calls the "one bank" model. Under the restructuring, every board had a mix of executives from all three divisions. It also changed the compensation and commission models to encourage cross-division referrals and created a "solution partners" group that functions between the investment and private banking divisions. Following the restructure, Credit Suisse's private banking division grew 19% per year despite the economic crisis. The firm bumped long-time rival UBS off the number one position in Euromoney's private banking poll. In 2006, Credit Suisse acknowledged misconduct for helping Iran and other countries hide transactions from US authorities and paid a $536 million settlement. The same year it merged Bank Leu AG, Clariden Holding AG, Bank Hofmann AG and BGP Banca di Gestione Patrimoniale into a new company called Clariden Leu.

Credit Suisse claims to operate a process which since 2007 uses RepRisk, a Swiss provider of ESG Risk analytics and metrics, to screen and evaluate environmental and social risks of risky transactions and due diligence.

In 2009, Yellowstone Club founder Tim Blixseth sued Credit Suisse when the bank attempted to collect on $286 million in loan debt during Yellowstone's bankruptcy proceedings. The debtor had borrowed more than $300 million for the business, but used a large portion of it for personal use before eventually filing for bankruptcy. Four lawsuits were filed from other resorts seeking $24 billion in damages alleging Credit Suisse created loans with the intention of taking over their properties upon default.

=== 2009–2024 ===
According to The Wall Street Journal in 2008, "Credit Suisse survived the credit crisis better than many competitors." Credit Suisse had $902 million in write-downs for subprime holdings and the same amount for leveraged loans, but it did not have to borrow from the government. Along with other banks, Credit Suisse was investigated and sued by US authorities in 2012 for bundling mortgage loans with securities and misrepresenting the risks of underlying mortgages during the housing price boom. Following the crisis, Credit Suisse cut more than one-trillion in assets and made plans to cut its investment banking arm 37% by 2014. It reduced emphasis on investment banking and focused on private banking and wealth management. In July 2011, Credit Suisse cut 2,000 jobs in response to a weaker-than-expected economic recovery and later merged its asset management with the private bank group to cut additional costs.

We sell [bank] safety not bank secrecy. Being a safe haven in a world that is becoming increasingly dangerous and volatile is no bad place to be.

— Tidjane Thiam, chief executive of Credit Suisse, in a 2018 interview with the Bloomberg Markets

A series of international investigations took place in the early 2000s regarding the use of banking secrecy in Credit Suisse accounts for tax evasion. In 2008, the Brazilian government investigated 13 former and current Credit Suisse employees. The investigation led to arrests that year and in 2009 as part of a larger crackdown in Brazil. Four Credit Suisse bankers were accused of fraud by the US Justice Department in 2011 for helping wealthy Americans avoid taxes. In 2012, German authorities found that citizens were using insurance policies of a Bermuda-based Credit Suisse subsidiary to earn tax-free interest.

In November 2012, Credit Suisse's asset management division was merged with the private banking arm. In September 2012, the Swiss government gave banks like Credit Suisse permission to provide information to the US Justice Department for tax evasion probes. In February 2014, it agreed to pay a fine of $197 million after one of its businesses served 8,500 US clients without registering its activities, leading to suspicion as to whether it was helping Americans evade taxes. It was one of 14 Swiss banks under investigation. Separately, in 2013, German authorities began to probe Credit Suisse, its private bank subsidiary Clariden Leu, and its regional subsidiary Neue Aargauer Bank for helping German citizens evade taxes. In 2012, the bank eventually entered into a €150 million settlement with the government.

In March 2014, Credit Suisse denied claims it had been drawn into a Swiss competition probe investigating potential collusion to manipulate foreign exchange rates (Forex scandal) by various Swiss and foreign banks. In May 2014, Credit Suisse pleaded guilty to conspiring to aid tax evasion. It was the most prominent bank to plead guilty in the United States since Drexel Burnham Lambert in 1989 and the largest to do so since the Bankers Trust in 1999. "Credit Suisse conspired to help US citizens hide assets in offshore accounts to evade paying taxes. When a bank engages in misconduct this brazen, it should expect that the Justice Department will pursue criminal prosecution to the fullest extent possible, as has happened here," Attorney General Eric Holder said at the time. Holder also said, "This case shows that no financial institution, no matter its size or global reach, is above the law."

In March 2015, it was announced that Tidjane Thiam, the CEO of Prudential would leave to become the next CEO of Credit Suisse. In September 2016, Brian Chin was appointed Chief Executive of Global Markets and joined the executive board of the bank. At this time, it was also announced that Eric M. Varvel was appointed president and CEO of Credit Suisse Holdings (USA).

The collapse of Lehman Brothers resulted in a significant decline in trust and confidence among consumers and market participants in the banking industry. The loss in confidence is reflected in the large loss of share prices across the Swiss banking sector after 2008.

In August 2019, Credit Suisse announced the formation of a new "direct banking" business unit under its Switzerland division (Swiss Universal Bank, SUB), focusing on digital retail products. The step is seen as a reaction to the emergence of FinTech competitors such as N26 or Revolut in Switzerland and shall help to better attract young clients. In July 2020, Thomas Gottstein, the new CEO of the company, announced restructuring; it was influenced as a result of the trading surge in Q2 of 2020, amid the COVID-19 pandemic. The planned restructuring is set "to reduce costs and improve efficiencies" and features some reverts of alterations brought by the previous CEO, Thiam. According to Gottstein, "These initiatives should also help to provide resilience in uncertain markets and deliver further upside when more positive economic conditions prevail."

In November 2022, Credit Suisse announced that it was selling the majority of its Securitized Products Group to Apollo Global Management. Credit Suisse cited a reduction in Risk-weighted assets as the primary factor driving the sale. The deal was expected to close in the first half of 2023. The spin-off was branded Atlas SP, and the deal was ultimately finalized in March 2024.

In December 2022, Credit Suisse completed a CHF 4.00 bn capital increase by way of a CHF 2.24 bn rights issue and a CHF 1.80 bn private placing.

On 9 February 2023, the bank reported an annual loss of CHF 7.3bn, the biggest loss since the 2008 financial crisis. On 14 March of that same year, Credit Suisse published its annual report for 2022, saying it had identified "material weaknesses" in controls over financial reporting.

=== Collapse ===
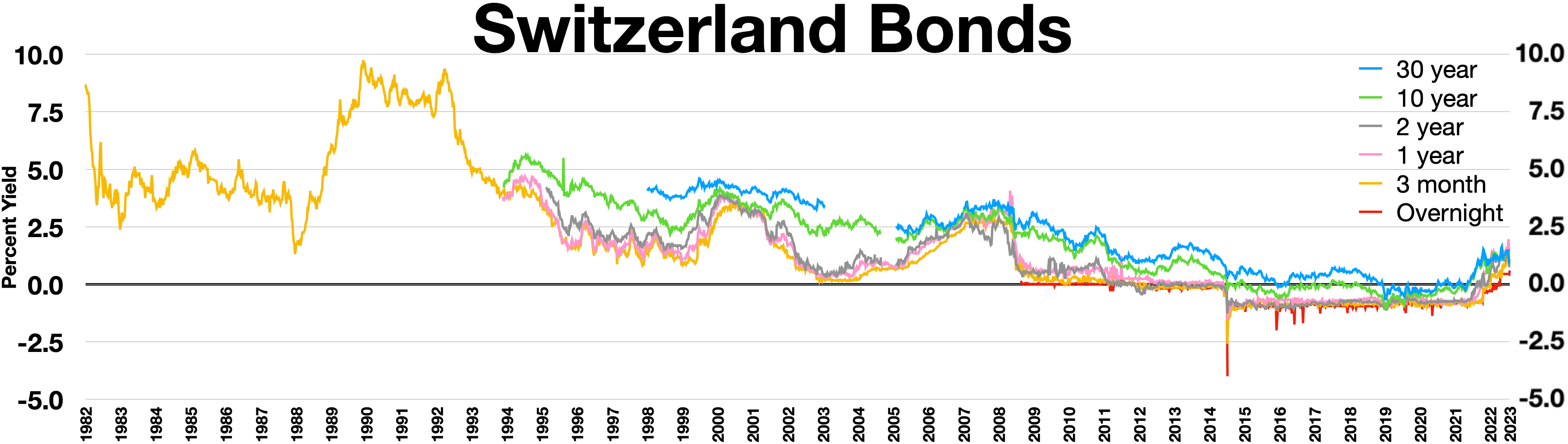
Switzerland bonds Inverted yield curve in 2023 30 year 10 year 2 year 1 year 3 month Overnight

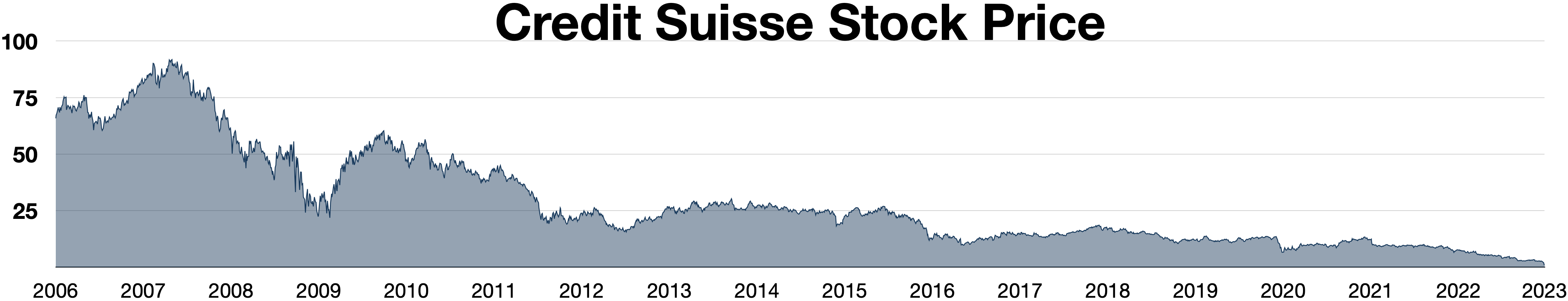
Credit Suisse stock price

On 15 March 2023, Credit Suisse' share price dropped nearly 25% after Saudi National Bank, its largest investor, said it could not provide more financial assistance. The market price of the bank's unsecured bonds set for maturity in 2027 dropped to a low of 33% of their par value on that day, down from being valued at 90% of their par value at the beginning of the month.

Later in the same week, Credit Suisse sought to shore up its finances by taking a loan of 50 billion Swiss francs from the Swiss National Bank (SNB); the bank later proceeded to buy three billion Swiss francs of its own debt and to put the Baur en Ville hotel in Zürich for sale. However, this intervention did not stop investors and customers from pulling their money out of Credit Suisse, with outflows topping 10 billion Swiss francs during the week, and almost $69 billion (approximately 61 billion Swiss francs) in withdrawals during the first calendar quarter. The situation was so compromised that the SNB and the Swiss government started discussions to fast-track the bank's acquisition by UBS. On 19 March 2023, UBS announced a deal had been reached to acquire Credit Suisse for US$3.25 billion (CHF 3 billion) in an all-stock deal.

In the course of the takeover negotiations, the Swiss Financial Market Supervisory Authority (FINMA) issued an order requiring that the Additional Tier 1 (AT1) instruments classified as Tier 1 capital issued by Credit Suisse be fully written down, thereby rendering them worthless. European regulators have criticized the moral hazard of the AT1 bondholders suffering in the loss of their capital rather than the shareholders of the bank. Shortly after the write-off, various bondholders, represented by Quinn Emanuel Urquhuart & Sullivan and its Managing Partner Prof. Dr. Thomas Werlen, have handed in an official complaint against FINMA's administrative order in front of the Federal Administrative Court of Switzerland. In June 2024, a group of Credit Suisse bondholders holding $82 million worth of the bank's AT1 debt filed a lawsuit against Switzerland seeking compensation. They were also represented by the law firm Quinn Emanuel Urquhart & Sullivan and its partner, Dennis Hranitzky. On 14 October 2025, in a partial ruling, the Federal Administrative Court in St. Gallen fully upheld the appeal brought by the plaintiffs represented by attorney Prof. Dr. Thomas Werlen and held that FINMA had lacked any legal basis for ordering the write-down. FINMA and UBS (as the universal legal successor to Credit Suisse) subsequently filed an appeal, which means that the AT1 matter will now proceed before the Federal Supreme Court.

According to financial analysts, economic sanctions imposed by Switzerland on Russian individuals and businesses had a significant impact on the demise of the bank. According to Bloomberg News, Credit Suisse held about $33 billion for Russian clients, 50% more than UBS.

In late April 2023, the political and economic fallout had been evaluated by a number of economic analysts, particularly the resulting lack of banking competition in Switzerland's economy. The takeover by UBS had limited the choice of lenders, particularly for small and medium-sized companies. Credit Suisse's international reach had affected the employment situation in Europe as well as other regions. The Swiss economy as such also relies on a number of heavily capitalised state banks that have been a significant lender to those smaller enterprises, particularly after the demise of CS.

=== Post-acquisition ===
On 27 June 2023, UBS announced its intention to cut more than half of Credit Suisse's workforce. In July 2024, Credit Suisse (Schweiz) ceased to exist as a separate legal entity after fully being integrated into UBS Switzerland.

In 2023, the Credit Suisse unit in Singapore was ordered to pay $743 million to Georgian billionaire Bidzina Ivanishvili for fraud.

== Corporate structure ==
1 Macquarie Place skyscraper in Sydney with the Credit Suisse logo, 2023

Credit Suisse Group AG is organised as a joint-stock company registered in Zürich that operates as a holding company. It owns the Credit Suisse bank and other interests in the financial services business. Credit Suisse is governed by a board of directors, its shareholders, and independent auditors. The Board of Directors organise the annual General Meeting of Shareholders while investors with large stakes in the company determine the agenda. Shareholders elect auditors for one-year terms, approve the annual report and other financial statements, and have other powers granted by law. Shareholders elect members of the board of directors to serve a three-year term based on candidates nominated by the chairman's and Governance Committee and the Board of Directors meet six times a year to vote on company resolutions. The Board sets Credit Suisse's business strategies and approves its compensation (remuneration) principles based on guidance from the compensation committee. It also has the authority to create committees that delegate specific management functions.

Credit Suisse has the following operational divisions:

- Private Banking & Wealth Management has wealth management, corporate and institutional businesses.
- Investment Banking handles securities, investment research, trading, prime brokerage, and capital procurement.
- Credit Suisse Asset Management sells investment classes, alternative investments, real-estate, equities, fixed income products, and other financial products.
- Shared Services department provides support functions like risk management, legal, IT, and marketing to all areas.

Operations are divided into four regions: Switzerland, Europe, the Middle East, and Africa, the Americas, and the Asian Pacific.

On 9 May 2023, Credit Suisse announced that it would continue its banking operations but under the hospice of UBS in order to fulfill its financial obligations towards existing clients as well as employees of both banks. CEO Ulrich Körner will join UBS's executive board.

== Ownership ==
In August 2022, it was revealed that the largest shareholder of Credit Suisse was in fact American, namely Harris Associates, holding over 10% of the shares of the group. Harris Associates itself is owned by French bank Natixis.

As of 25 January 2023, Saudi National Bank, an anchor investor, held a 10% stake; Qatar Investment Authority (QIA) boosted its stake in the Credit Suisse Group to 6.87%; and Harris Associates reported a holding of below 3%. Harris Associates reported having exited all its Credit Suisse positions by March 2023. Credit Suisse stock (CS) in the NYSE fell from $2.50 to $1.88 a share on 15 March 2023.

On 19 March 2023, fellow Swiss bank group UBS agreed to buy Credit Suisse for more than US$3 billion. The purchase of Credit Suisse by UBS has reportedly averted a greater crisis, according to SNB.

== Financial products ==
Wealth management services at Credit Suisse include estate planning, insurance, tax planning, philanthropy, investment products, foreign exchange, lending, managed accounts, and real estate. Investment banking services include securities, equity products, mergers and acquisitions, fixed income, mutual funds, hedge funds, and investment advice.

Credit Suisse endorses a strategy called bancassurance of trying to be a single company that offers every common financial services product. The investment bank is intended for companies and wealthy individuals with more than 50,000 euro.

Credit Suisse developed the CreditRisk+ model of risk assessment in loans, which is focused exclusively on the chance of default based on the exogenous Poisson method. As of 2002, about 20% of Credit Suisse's revenue was from its insurance business, which it gained through the 1997 acquisition of Winterthur. The investment bank's insurance products are primarily popular in the domestic market and include auto, fire, property, life, disability, pension, and retirement products, among others. Historically, 20–40% of the bank's revenue has been from private banking services, one of its higher profit-margin divisions.

Credit Suisse produces one of the six hedge funds following European stock indices that are used to evaluate the performance of the markets. The investment bank also has a 30% ownership stake in hedge fund investment firm York Capital Management. York sells hedge funds independently to its own clients, while Credit Suisse also offers them to private banking clients. Credit Suisse manages the financial instruments of the Dow Jones Credit Suisse long/short equity index (originally called Credit Suisse/Tremont Hedge Fund Indexes).

According to a 2011 article in Seeking Alpha, Credit Suisse's investment managers favor financial, technology and energy sector stocks. The bank's head of equity investments in Europe said the team focuses on "value with an emphasis on free cash flow." She also has an interest in companies undergoing management changes that may influence the stock price. According to a story in The Wall Street Journal, the head of Credit Suisse's International Focus Fund keeps a portfolio of only 40–50 stocks, instead of the industry-norm of more than 100. Credit Suisse publishes its investment advice in four publications: Compass, Viewpoints, Research, and the Credit Suisse Investment Committee Report.

On 5 May 2023, Credit Suisse announced it would buy Ecuadorian bonds worth $1.6 billion in a debt-for-nature swap that costs the Swiss bank only $644 million. As a result, the government of Ecuador pledged to spend about $18 million annually for two decades on conservation in the Galapagos islands, a UNESCO World Heritage Site. The bond purchase was below 55% of the purchase value and below 35.5% for the consecutive 5-year intervals after 2025. The underwriters for that deal are the Inter-American Development Bank (IDB) and the U.S. International Development Finance Cooperation, therefore limiting the risk for Credit Suisse. The deal effectively saves Ecuador from liquidity shortages due to an estimated public debt of $66.8 billion. In April 2020, Ecuador repaid $1 billion of loans made two years earlier by Goldman Sachs and Credit Suisse.

== Reputation and rankings ==
The reputation of the bank is controversial. From the 1940s until into the 2010s, besides regular customers, Credit Suisse offered criminals, corrupt politicians, and controversial secret service chiefs a safe haven for their assets, despite all public declarations of a "white money" strategy.

Until its acquisition by UBS in 2023, Credit Suisse was a member of Wall Street's bulge bracket, a list of the largest and most profitable banks. The company was one of the world's most important banks, upon which international financial stability depends. The bank was also one of Fortune Magazine's most admired companies.

As of 2004, Credit Suisse was first in volume of high-yield transactions, second for corporate high-yield bond insurance, and third for IPO underwriting. As of 2012, Credit Suisse was recognised as the world's best private bank by Euromoney's Global Private Banking Survey and as the best European Equity Manager by Global Investors. In polls by Euromoney, it has been ranked as the top private bank and the best bank in Switzerland. In 1995, the Securities Data Company ranked Credit Suisse as the fourth best place for financial advice for mergers and acquisitions in the US and sixth for domestic equity issues. Credit Suisse was recognized by the Asset Triple A Awards, and in 2005 it was ranked as the second-best prime broker by Institutional Investor.

An investigation in February 2022 by The Guardian following the Suisse Secrets leaks revealed that Credit Suisse was holding bank accounts for many criminals, fraudsters, and corrupt politicians.

In early September 2023, UBS had clearly profited from the takeover, as its stocks were increasingly valuable. From April to July, UBS made a record profit of 29.2 billion CHF, and its stocks, which were initially depressed after the fusion, were traded at much higher prices. The record profit was based on the difference between the purchase price of Credit Suisse stocks and the apparently higher value of its assets. In March 2025, investigations uncovered that Credit Suisse allegedly concealed Nazi-linked bank accounts by placing them under a secret "American blacklist" file to evade detection. This revelation suggests that the bank maintained accounts connected to known Nazis and entities involved in seizing Jewish-owned assets during World War II. The company has received criticism for the financial services it provided to Nazi Germany during World War 2, such as laundering stolen gold to help Nazi Germany purchase war materials.

== Controversies ==
=== Mismarking, 2007 ===
In 2007, two Credit Suisse traders pleaded guilty to mismarking their securities positions to overvalue them by $3 billion, avoid losses, and increase their year-end bonuses. Federal prosecutors and the Securities and Exchange Commission charged that the traders' goal was to obtain lavish year-end bonuses that the mismarking would lead to. The traders engaged in what The New York Times called "a brazen scheme to artificially increase the price of bonds on their books to create fictitious profits". A team of traders, facing an inquiry from Credit Suisse's internal controls price testing group, justified their bond portfolio's inflated value by obtaining "independent" marks from other banks' dealing departments.

The traders secured sham "independent" marks for illiquid securities that they held positions in from friends who worked at other financial firms. Their friends generated prices that valued a number of bonds at the prices that the traders requested, which the traders then recorded as the true value of the bonds. The bank was not charged in the case. Credit Suisse's outside auditor discovered the mismarkings during an audit. Credit Suisse took a $2.65 billion write-down after discovering its traders' mismarking.

=== Japan limited income tax case, 2008 ===
In November 2008, 300 current and former Credit Suisse employees had understated or completely failed to declare stock-based compensation. Among all these cases one individual, Takashi Hatta was prosecuted from the investigation done by the Tokyo Regional Taxation Bureau. He insisted that he did not intend tax evasion, not realizing Credit Suisse had not withheld income tax, as is usual in Japan. After years of investigation and trials, Hatta was acquitted.

=== International Emergency Economic Powers Act and New York State Law violations, 2009 ===
On 16 December 2009, it was announced that the US Department of Justice (DOJ) reached a settlement with Credit Suisse over accusations that the bank assisted residents of International Emergency Economic Powers Act-sanctioned countries to wire money in violation of the Act as well as New York law from 1995 to 2006. The settlement resulted in Credit Suisse forfeiting $536 million.

=== US tax fraud conspiracy, 2014, 2023 ===
In 2014, Credit Suisse pleaded guilty to conspiring with Americans to file false tax returns. Credit Suisse subsequently paid $2.6 billion in fines and restitution. It was reported in 2022 that the US DOJ had opened an investigation into whether the bank continued to assist clients hide assets from tax authorities despite the terms of the 2014 settlement. According to the DOJ in 2023, Credit Suisse violated a plea agreement with US authorities by failing to report secret offshore accounts that wealthy Americans used to avoid paying taxes.

=== Malaysia Development Berhad scandal, 2015 ===
In September 2015 Hong Kong police began investigations regarding $250 million in Credit Suisse branch deposits in Hong Kong linked to former Malaysia's Prime Minister Najib Razak and Malaysian sovereign wealth fund, 1Malaysia Development Berhad (1MDB). In 2017, Singapore fined Credit Suisse a total of S$0.7m (£0.4m, $0.5m, €0.45m). In May 2017, Reuters reported that "Swiss financial watchdog FINMA ... had conducted "extensive investigations" into Credit Suisse's dealings surrounding 1MDB". In 2019 FINMA issued a complaint to Credit Suisse.

=== Mozambique secret loans scandal, 2017 ===
Between 2012 and 2016, Credit Suisse brokered US$1.3 billion of loans with Mozambican finance minister Manuel Chang, to develop the country's tuna fishing industry. The loans were issued as bonds to be paid off by the income from tuna fishing as well as the country's nascent natural gas industry. Chang lied to investors, his own government, the IMF and the banks issuing the loans, including Credit Suisse. Credit Suisse was fined almost US$500 million by UK, US, and European regulators for a lack of transparency in the issuing of the bonds, for kickbacks benefitting Credit Suisse bankers, and for enabling loans likely to be embezzled by Mozambican officials, including Chang. In October 2021, Credit Suisse pled guilty to wire fraud and agreed to forgive US$200 million in debt owed by Mozambique to the bank. In March 2025, The UK's Financial Conduct Authority (FCA) prohibited Andrew Pearse and Surjan Singh, former managing directors at Credit Suisse, from working in the UK financial services industry.

=== US Foreign Corrupt Practices Act violation, 2018 ===
On 5 July 2018, Credit Suisse agreed to pay a $47 million fine to the US Department of Justice and $30 million to resolve charges of the US Securities and Exchange Commission (SEC). The SEC's investigation said that the banking group sought investment banking business in the Asia-Pacific region by hiring and promoting more than one hundred Chinese officials and related people in violation of the Foreign Corrupt Practices Act.

=== Climate controversy, 2018 ===
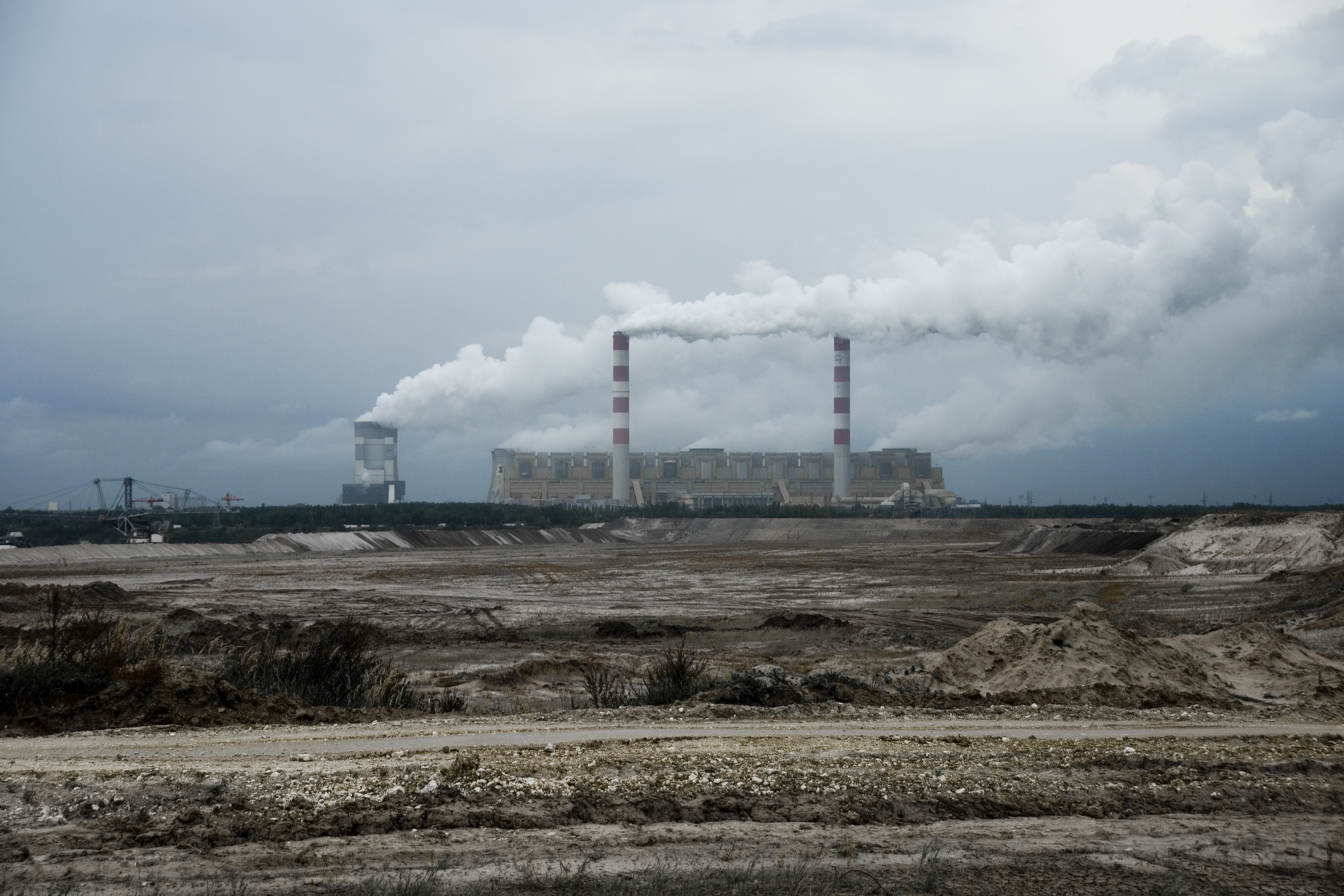
Credit Suisse invests in fossil fuels, including coal-fired power stations.

In November 2018, about a dozen climate activists played tennis inside Credit Suisse agencies (of Lausanne, Geneva and Basel simultaneously), disrupting operations as a protest against the bank's investments in fossil fuels. Credit Suisse lodged a complaint, and the activists from Lausanne were tried in January 2020 and fined 21,600 CHF. They were initially cleared of all charges in what a Swiss media outlet considered a 'historical decision'. Their acquittal was later overturned by an appeals court in September 2020, and the conviction was upheld by the Swiss Federal Tribunal in June 2021.

The tennis theme was chosen to urge Swiss tennis star Roger Federer to break his connection with Credit Suisse as a sponsor due to the company's participating in the climate crisis (notably by multiplying 16-fold its financing for coal from 2016 to 2017). On 11 January 2020, Federer published a statement saying, "[...] I have a great deal of respect and admiration for the youth climate movement, and I am grateful to young climate activists for pushing us all to examine our behaviours," and further committed to a dialogue with his sponsors on social issues.

On 24 January 2020, following the trial, the climate activist group issued a press statement requesting a transparent, televised debate with the CEO of Credit Suisse. With no answer from the bank, they created a website under the name "DiscreditSuisse" hosting content pertaining to Credit Suisse's record on climate issues.

=== Private spying scandal, 2019 ===
In 2019, a senior executive who was leaving the firm discovered that Pierre-Olivier Bouée, the chief operating officer (COO) of Credit Suisse at the time, had hired private detectives to follow him to see if he was wooing Credit Suisse clients. Bouée was fired, and a private investigator involved in the surveillance apparently killed himself.

=== Greensill Capital, 2021 ===
In March 2021, Credit Suisse closed and liquidated several supply-chain investment funds tied to the activities of Greensill Capital. The investors in the funds, which totalled assets of approximately $10 billion, were expected to lose $3 billion as of March 2021. Credit Suisse has returned around $7.4 billion to investors in its Greensill-linked funds.

=== Archegos Capital, 2021 ===
In April 2021, at least seven executives were removed from their posts after Credit Suisse reported losses of $4.7 billion linked to its prime brokerage services provided to Archegos Capital. The executives who departed included Lara Warner, the group's chief risk and compliance officer, and Brian Chin, head of the investment bank. Just prior to Credit Suisse's 2021 Annual General Meeting, Andreas Gottschling, head of the board's risk committee, also stepped down. In July 2023, Credit Suisse's parent UBS was fined $269 million by the Federal Reserve and $119 million by the Bank of England for its failure in risk management.

=== Forex manipulations conviction, 2021 ===
In 2021, Credit Suisse was fined €83.3 million for forex rates manipulation by the European Union Commission on Competition because of its participation in a cartel detrimental to EU consumers and involving several other large international banks. In October 2022, a US jury found that Credit Suisse did not collude with other banks to manipulate forex rates, in a class-action trial.

=== Drug money laundering scandal, 2022 ===
On 7 February 2022, it was announced that Credit Suisse would be tried in the first criminal trial of a major bank in Switzerland. Swiss prosecutors are seeking around 42 million Swiss francs ($45 million) in compensation from Credit Suisse for allowing a Bulgarian cocaine trafficking gang around Evelin Banev to launder millions of euros of cash between 2004 and 2008. On 27 June 2022, the bank, as well as one of its former employees, was found guilty by the Federal Criminal Court of Switzerland for not doing enough to prevent the crime from taking place. The court imposed a fine of CHF 2 million and ordered the confiscation of assets worth more than CHF 12 million that the drug gang held in accounts at the bank and the relinquishment of over CHF 19 million—the amount that could not be confiscated due to internal deficiencies at the bank. The bank said it would appeal against the verdict.

=== Suisse secrets leak, 2022 ===
In February 2022, details of 30,000 customers holding over 100bn Swiss francs (£80bn) in accounts at the bank were leaked to the Süddeutsche Zeitung and became known as "Suisse Secrets". Among those with accounts at the bank were a human trafficker, a torturer, drug traffickers, and a Vatican-run account that allegedly invested €350m fraudulently in London property. On 20 February, Credit Suisse said it "strongly rejects" allegations of wrongdoing.

=== Russian oligarch loans documents destruction after invasion of Ukraine, 2022 ===
Following Swiss sanctions on Russia during the 2022 Russian invasion of Ukraine, Credit Suisse issued legal requests asking hedge funds and other investors to destroy documents linking Russian oligarchs to yacht loans, a move for which it faced considerable criticism. The US House Oversight Committee launched a probe into the firm demanding documents linked to the bank's compliance with sanctions on Russian oligarchs.

=== Social media rumours, 2022 ===
In early October 2022, Credit Suisse stocks came under considerable pressure when rumours on social media projected the demise of the bank. According to financial analysts, the bank has a “strong capital base and liquidity position.” Nevertheless, the Swiss National Bank vowed to follow the situation closely. European finance experts in particular talked of a "self-fulfilling risk" since liquidity is not a problem for the Swiss bank. CS had suffered severe losses in 2021 from the Archegos and Greensill financial scandals that implicated former Archegos executives with racketeering conspiracy, securities fraud and wire fraud.

On 7 October 2022, the bank offered to buy back US$3 billion worth of debt and put Zurich's Savoy Hotel on sale, which was later purchased by wealthy Arab officials. The bank's current chairman, Axel Lehmann, also assured investors that the bank was stable after wealthy clients began moving their assets out of the bank. In the fallout from the falling stock prices, insiders believed that Saudi prince Mohammed bin Salman was looking to invest almost US$500 million into the bank but had to withdraw his offer due to regulatory concerns.

=== Nazi-linked accounts, 2023–2026 ===
In 2023, Credit Suisse stopped the internal investigation into its Nazi clients and other Nazi-linked accounts, facing much condemnation from the U.S. Senate Budget Committee and Holocaust survivors, among others. According to the most recent Senate report, at least 14 of these stayed open until the 2000s. In February 2026, amongst a U.S. Senate Judiciary Committee hearing, it emerged that 890 Nazi-linked accounts had been identified, some of which were related to the postwar Nazi escape routes, known as ratlines.

At the hearing, UBS defended its withholding of over 150 documents, arguing that if released the Simon Wiesenthal Center might bring further litigation related to Credit Suisse's 1990s probe, which had excluded most Nazi-held accounts. Special investigator Neil Barofsky noted that a blind search of these documents detected Nazis linked to his probe. Whether the 1990s omission was intentional is unclear and the language of the settlement covers all known and unknown claims. In March 2026, UBS requested an advisory opinion from U.S. District Court Judge Edward R. Korman to shield it from litigation if it shared the files, which the judge declined the following month. As result, UBS said it would not release the files. Barofsky accused the bank of withholding over 22,000 pages, in addition to a reported 388,000 pages being reviewed for redaction.

=== Evading taxes, 2025 ===
On May 5, 2025, Credit Suisse Services AG, a unit of Credit Suisse, pleaded guilty to U.S. charges of assisting ultra-wealthy Americans in evading taxes. The bank admitted to conspiring to hide more than $4 billion from the Internal Revenue Service (IRS) in at least 475 offshore accounts, including accounts maintained in Singapore. This conduct violated a 2014 plea agreement under which Credit Suisse had previously paid a $2.5 billion fine for similar offenses. As part of the new settlement, Credit Suisse agreed to pay over $510 million in fines and entered into a non-prosecution agreement requiring ongoing cooperation with U.S. authorities.

== Work environment ==
Credit Suisse was more internationally minded than most European banks.

Roles and responsibilities were less stringent, and the environment was pleasant despite hours being "the most grueling on Wall Street." Vault's Insider's Guide noted above-average training, executive access, and openness matched with reports of 80- to 100-hour workweeks.

In 2023, the bank made moves to pay bonuses to top executives and senior bankers upfront but included an added condition that they needed to stay with the bank for three years, or else they would need to pay the bonus, or some of the bonus, back to the company. Later the Swiss federal government, as well as the last General Assembly of Credit Suisse shareholders voted to withdraw or seriously reduce bonus payments to top management.

== See also ==
- Bank in Zürich – acquired by Credit Suisse in 1905
- Banco Garantia – Defunct Brazilian investment bank
- Banking in Switzerland
- First Boston Corporation – American investment bank
- World Jewish Congress lawsuit against Swiss banks – 1995
