= Jonathan Gil Harris =

New Zealand and Indian scholar (born 1963)

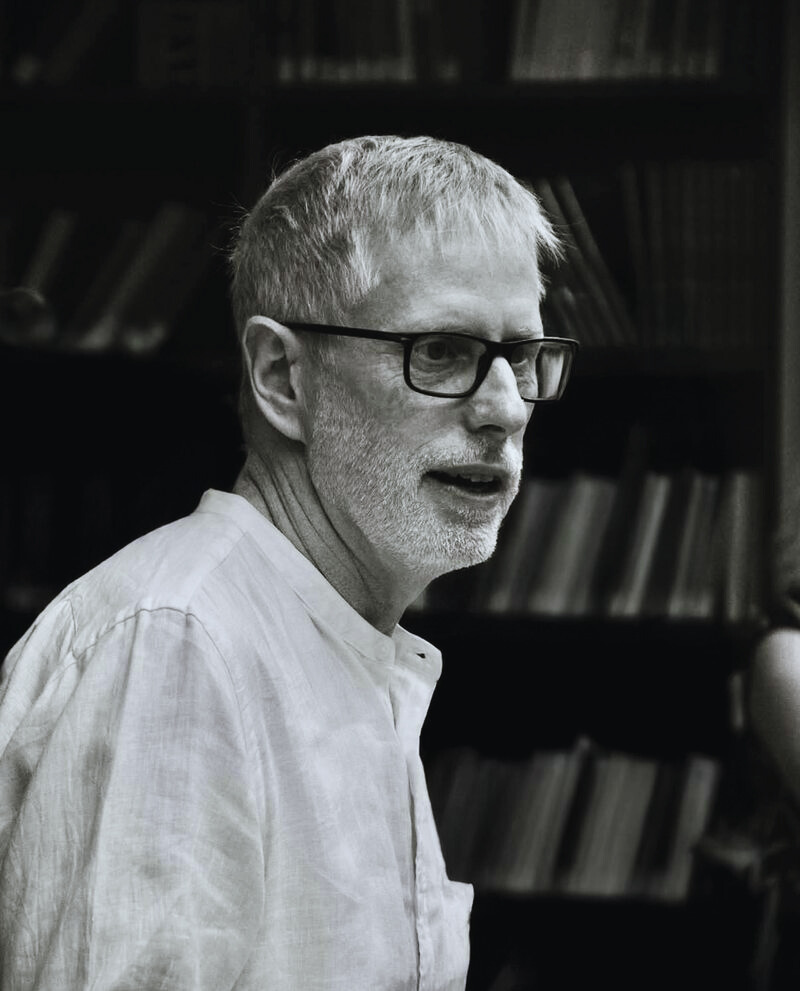
- Gil Harris in 2023
- Born: Jonathan Gil Harris; 1963 (age 62–63); New Zealand
- Education: University of Auckland, University of Sussex
- Occupations: Writer; professor
- Writing career
- Language: English
- Genres: Non-fiction, Hybrid memoir
- Subjects: Shakespeare, Renaissance, Cultural history, Migration studies, Cultural materialism
- Notable works: The First Firangis: Remarkable Stories of Heroes, Healers, Charlatans, Courtesans, and Other Foreigners Who Became Indian, The Girl from Fergana: Secrets of My Mother’s Chinese Tea Chest

Jonathan Gil Harris (born 1963) is a writer, critic, and professor of literature from New Zealand and based in India. He is the writer of non-fiction books of cultural history, The First Firangis: Remarkable Stories of Heroes, Healers, Charlatans, Courtesans, and Other Foreigners Who Became Indian (2015), Masala Shakespeare: How a Firangi Writer Became Indian (2018), and a hybrid memoir about his mother and the Silk Roads, The Girl from Fergana: Secrets of My Mother’s Chinese Tea Chest (2026). He is a renowned scholar of Shakespeare's drama, its Indian adaptations, early modern globalization and migration. He has been Professor of English at Ashoka University since its inception.

== Life and career ==
=== Education and career ===
Jonathan Gil Harris studied at the University of Auckland, and completed his DPhil at the University of Sussex. At Sussex, he was part of a group of academics in the United Kingdom interested in interdisciplinary humanities, cultural materialism, and literary theory, taught by Alan Sinfield, Peter Stallybrass, Jonathan Dollimore, Homi Bhabha, Jacqueline Rose, and Geoffrey Bennington. He has since then taught literature, first in the United States at Ithaca College and George Washington University, where he was associate editor of Shakespeare Quarterly from 2006 to 2013, before moving to India, where he teaches at Ashoka University. He was also the founding Dean of Academic Affairs at Ashoka. He was President of The Shakespeare Society of India from 2014 to 2018 and continues to serve on its advisory board.

=== Family and life ===
Jonathan Gil Harris was born in 1963 to Norman Harris and Stella Shulamit Harris (née Freud) in New Zealand. His maternal family is Jewish, and his mother was one of the many Polish Jews deported to Soviet Central Asia in the 1940s. Her time in the Fergana Valley, through which the Silk Roads passed for many centuries, is the centerpiece of Harris’ 2026 book The Girl from Fergana.

Harris's library was featured in the photojournalist Mayank Austen Soofi's city-project The Delhi Walla as having "arguably the best collection dealing with Shakespeare."

He lives in Delhi, India. His partner is Madhavi Menon, literary critic and professor of literature.

== Work ==
Harris has written extensively on Shakespeare and Renaissance drama, early modern culture, and literary theory. He is especially interested in Renaissance ideas of globalization, the foreign, illness, temporality, and materialism. Since moving to Delhi in 2013, his writing has turned largely to histories of migration in the Indian subcontinent and along the Silk Roads.

While his early books are academic monographs and edited collections, Harris has been writing for a general audience since moving to India, and is a sought-after presence in literary festivals, both on national and global stages. He is also a follower and scholar of Bollywood cinema and has written public-facing articles in The Hindustan Times, The Globalist, and Outlook India.

=== The First Firangis ===
The First Firangis: Remarkable Stories of Heroes, Healers, Charlatans, Courtesans, and Other Foreigners Who Became Indian is the first of Harris's hybrid crossover books in which cultural history, biography, and literary criticism work alongside autobiography. The First Firangis primarily chronicles the history of Western migration to the subcontinent before colonization and the establishment of Empire, by covering the lives of fourteen "firangis" who were some of the first migrant settlers in India. It features the stories, among others, of Thomas Stephens, Augustin Hiriart, Thomas Coryate, Garcia de Orta and Niccolo Manucci. The book received universal acclaim, is a bestseller, and is in print more than a decade after its publication. Writing in Open, the poet and critic Ranjit Hoskote called the book a "brilliant, elegantly argued and richly detailed study". Mark Tully reviewed the book favorably in Mint writing that "Harris tells fascinating stories of extraordinary men and women, and their lives lead him to consider what becoming Indian means." Nandini Das recommends the book in a reading list of pre-colonial histories of India, and especially lauds Harris for "tackling the problem of recording lives of which the barest traces remain." The book has been translated into Marathi by Rekha Deshpande.

Harris is currently at work on a sequel, The Last Firangis, which tells the stories of forty foreigners who could have left India after its independence but chose to remain.

=== Masala Shakespeare ===
In 2016, Harris received, with Madhavi Menon, the Dr Alice Griffin Fellowship of Shakespearean Studies at the University of Auckland, where he worked on his next book, Masala Shakespeare: How a Firangi Writer Became Indian, which was published in 2018. It explains the thematic and structural resonances of Shakespearean plays and Bollywood films. It uses “masala” – derived from the “masala film” – as a theoretical idea with which to understand the plurality of both Indian and early modern cultures. Masala Shakespeare was also a bestseller, featured by not only academic and book critics, but also film critics, as it contains many analyses of films that directly and indirectly related to Shakespeare's texts. Noted film critic Baradwaj Rangan devoted an episode to the book in his Film Companion Recommends series.

=== The Girl from Fergana ===
The Girl from Fergana: Secrets from My Mother’s Chinese Tea Chest, on which he worked for twelve years, was released in 2026. Both a personal memoir and a book of cultural history, it tells the story of his mother, Stella Harris (nee Freud) and her family who were deported from what is now Ukraine to the Fergana Valley during World War II, and the larger history of Jewish migration across the Silk Roads. The book presents a commentary on modes of community and belonging that transcend the nation-state. It was reviewed as a "tender, evocative and poignant" book in The Tribune by Mandira Nayar, who admired the weave of the personal and the historical to "make sense of the complex pluralistic past." Calling it "an elegy for a syncretic world" in The Hindu, Sumana Mukherjee commended the book's urgency and erudition, observing that "Harris uses philology, etymology, sociology, theology, history, literature, and geography to deepen and widen the narrative."

=== Academic books ===
Harris’s early books were concerned with new ideas of disease in Shakespeare’s time, and how they related to emerging patterns of globalization and nation-state formation. His first book, Foreign Bodies and the Body Politic: Discourses of Social Pathology in Early Modern England (Cambridge, 1998), examined how understandings of disease shifted in the sixteenth century from an older model of humoral imbalance to the concept of the “foreign body,” which made it easier to pathologize migrants and socially marginal peoples such as Jews and witches. His second book, Sick Economies: Drama, Mercantilism and Disease in Shakespeare’s England (U Penn P, 2004), looked at how mercantilist writing in early modern England, suffused with metaphors of disease, contributed to the modern understanding of the nation-state as a body needing protection from unhealthy external forces.

Harris’s third book, Untimely Matter in the Time of Shakespeare (U Penn P, 2008) was named by Choice as a notable academic title. It examined how Shakespeare and his contemporaries understood the “orient” not just spatially and culturally but also materially and temporally.

Harris was awarded the National Endowment for the Humanities Fellowship in 2008-09 at the Folger Institute, where he completed his fourth book, Shakespeare and Literary Theory (Oxford UP, 2011). This covers in each of its twelve chapters a field of literary theory and its relationship to Shakespeare’s plays and poetry. Apart from being a comprehensive guidebook, the book argues that literary theories are less extraneously applied to Shakespeare’s work than they have been generated from within the material of his texts.

In 2012, Harris published a short monograph, Marvellous Repossessions: The Tempest, Globalization and the Waking Dream of Paradise (Ronsdale Press) based on his 2011 Garnett Sedgewick Memorial Lecture at the University of British Columbia in Vancouver, Canada.

Migration has been a central theme in Gil Harris’ work. He has maintained that “all culture is actually conversation, indeed a function of translation.” His own experiences of migration find mention in and fuel his work, as evident in The First Firangis and Masala Shakespeare, which include anecdotes of his own experiences of settling in India. He has also contributed to an anthology of critical and creative writing on the experiences and possibilities of dislocation, Crossings: Migrant Knowledges and Migrant Forms, edited by Natalya Din-Kariuki, Subha Mukherji, and Rowan Williams. As part of The Global Humanities initiative, he participated in the Migrant Ecologies symposia, which investigated the relationship between migration and the physical world.

== Bibliography ==
=== Non-fiction ===
- Jonathan Gil Harris (2015). The First Firangis: Remarkable Stories of Heroes, Healers, Charlatans, Courtesans & other Foreigners who Became Indian. Aleph Book Company. ISBN 9789382277637.
- — (2018). Masala Shakespeare: How a Firangi Writer Became Indian. Aleph Book Company. ISBN 9789388292269.
- — (2026). The Girl from Fergana: Secrets of My Mother’s Chinese Tea Chest. Aleph Book Company. ISBN 9789365234701.

=== Academic books ===
- Jonathan Gil Harris (1998). Foreign Bodies and the Body Politic: Discourses of Social Pathology in Early Modern England. Cambridge University Press. ISBN 9780521594059.
- — (2002). Staged Properties in Early Modern English Drama. Cambridge University Press. ISBN 9780521813228.
- — (2004). Sick Economies: Drama, Mercantilism, and Disease in Shakespeare’s England. University of Pennsylvania Press. ISBN 9780812237733.
- — (2008). Untimely Matter in the Time of Shakespeare. University of Pennsylvania Press. ISBN 9780812241181.
- — (2010). Shakespeare and Literary Theory. Oxford University Press. ISBN 9780199573387.
- — (2004). Marvellous Repossessions: The Tempest, Globalization and the Waking Dream of Paradise. Ronsdale Press. ISBN 9781553801412.
