= Cultural materialism =

Cultural materialism refers to two separate scholarly endeavours:

- Cultural materialism (anthropology), an anthropological research orientation first introduced by Marvin Harris
- Cultural materialism (cultural studies), a movement in literary theory and cultural studies originating with left-wing literary critic Raymond Williams
