= Funeral rituals and trends in Australia =

Funeral rituals and trends in Australia comprise a body of death-related customs, ceremonies, and regulatory practices in Australia. It varies based on cultural diversity and historical development. It reflects the influence of Indigenous mortuary traditions, religious rites introduced during the British colonisation, and funerary customs brought by post-war migration. Since late 20th century, demographic change, urbanisation, environmental concerns, and evolving consumer preferences have contributed to notable transformations in both the form and conduct of funerals in Australia.

== History ==
=== Indigenous mortuary traditions ===
Aboriginal and Torres Strait Islander funeral practices, commonly referred to as Sorry Business, encompass community-specific rites and obligations related to death and mourning. These may include ceremonial smoking, body painting, song, dance, and restrictions on the use of names and images of the deceased. In some communities, mourning periods extend over weeks or months, involving changes to residence or employment. Torres Strait Islander mortuary customs may involve multi-stage ceremonies, including feasts and reburials, as documented in ethnographic and historical sources.

=== Colonial and settler funeral culture ===
Nineteenth- and early twentieth-century settler funerary practice was dominated by Anglican and Catholic rites, formal church services, cemetery burial, and extensive mourning customs. Deaths frequently occurred at home, with the deceased displayed in the parlour before burial. Mourning attire, obituary notices, and memorial cards functioned as markers of social status, and professional undertakers increasingly replaced family-led care of the dead in urban areas.

=== Post-war migration influences ===
Post-1945 migration introduced Greek Orthodox, Muslim, Hindu, Buddhist, and other religious traditions, each with distinctive funeral rites. Greek Orthodox practice involves extended vigils and periodic commemorative liturgies; Islamic rites emphasise rapid burial, ritual washing, and orientation of the body towards Mecca; Hindu and Buddhist rites frequently incorporate cremation and symbolic offerings, adapted to local facilities and regulatory frameworks.

== Contemporary practices and changes ==
=== Disposition patterns and cremation ===
Cremation accounts for approximately 65% of funerals in Australia. Burial remains prevalent in many Indigenous communities, though cremation has been incorporated into modified rituals in some urban areas. Direct cremations—undertaken without a preceding formal service—are increasingly selected for reasons of cost and simplicity.

==== Donating bodies to science ====
Voluntarily donating bodies to science is an unusually popular choice in Australia, but still much less common than donating organs for transplant, and requires more paperwork. People make a request in their will stating that their body should be donated to science when they die. The bodies are used for scientific research and for teaching medical students. In some cases universities are offered more bodies than they are able to use, or donors die when staff are not available to accept them when the person dies, so bodies need to be diverted to the second-choice option in the dead person's will, or other alternatives need to be arranged.

=== Personalisation of services ===
Funerals frequently incorporate personalised music, curated imagery, and video tributes. Services are increasingly held in non-traditional venues such as gardens, beaches, and private residences.

== Digital funerals and livestream services ==
Digital technology has increasingly influenced funeral practices in Australia. The use of livestreamed funeral services expanded significantly during the COVID-19 pandemic when public health restrictions limited the number of people able to attend funerals and other gatherings in person.

During this period many funeral providers introduced livestream technology allowing relatives and friends to participate remotely in funeral ceremonies. Livestream services typically allow viewers to watch the ceremony in real time and may also provide recorded video archives that families can access after the service.

The availability of livestream funerals has continued beyond the pandemic, particularly for families with relatives living interstate or overseas who may be unable to travel to attend services in person.

Digital memorial platforms and online condolence pages have also become more common, enabling families to share tributes, photographs, and messages of support through funeral notice websites and memorial pages.

== Environmentally sustainable funerals ==
Environmental considerations have increasingly influenced funeral practices in Australia, with growing interest in options that reduce environmental impact. These include natural burials, biodegradable coffins, and reduced use of embalming chemicals.

Natural burial grounds aim to minimise environmental disturbance by using biodegradable materials and allowing burial sites to return to a natural landscape over time. Such practices may involve the use of shrouds or untreated timber coffins and the avoidance of concrete vaults or synthetic materials.

Some cemeteries and memorial parks in Australia have introduced sections dedicated to environmentally sustainable burials and memorialisation practices. These may include the interment of ashes beneath memorial trees or within natural landscape settings. Wooling Hill Memorial Estate in Victoria offers memorial tree interments in which families may inter ashes beneath existing trees or newly planted saplings.

In addition, funeral providers may offer biodegradable urns and other eco-friendly memorial products.

Interest in environmentally sustainable funerals reflects broader societal concerns about environmental impact and resource use, and aligns with international trends in natural and green burial practices.

=== Changing demographics and emerging responses ===
Millennials and younger Generation X individuals increasingly serve as principal decision-makers for funerals, particularly in urban centres. Studies indicate these cohorts often prioritise affordability, flexibility, and environmental sustainability. Research also notes greater use of online planning tools and preference for celebrant-led or non-traditional venues.

According to eziFunerals, Generation Z values affordability, environmental sustainability, and technology-driven memorials, influencing the way end-of-life services are designed and delivered in Australia.

In 2025, Australian funeral-planning platform eziFunerals predicted that burials, particularly natural and eco-burials, may experience renewed growth among younger generations due to environmental and cultural values. Peter Erceg (8 November 2025). "Burials Are Rising From the Dead – Why eziFunerals Predicts Burials Are the Next Big Thing". eziFunerals. eziFunerals Pty Ltd.

=== Role of social media ===
Social media platforms function as sites for mourning, memorialisation, and funeral coordination. Studies describe Facebook memorial pages and Instagram tribute posts as interactive commemorative spaces. Ethnographic work notes cultural and ethical issues related to consent and image use, especially in Indigenous contexts. Media reports show families using private groups or event pages to coordinate attendance and share livestream links.

As technology continues to influence the way Australians memorialise loved ones, the concept of “digital immortality” has become increasingly significant. According to eziFunerals, families are now considering how to manage online profiles, social media accounts, and digital memorials as part of end-of-life planning.

== Cremation trends in Australia ==
Cremation has become the most common method of disposition in Australia. Historically, burial was the dominant practice following European settlement, reflecting Christian traditions that favoured interment in cemeteries. However, cremation rates have increased steadily since the late twentieth century due to changing religious attitudes, urbanisation, and the limited availability of cemetery land in major cities.

By the early twenty-first century cremation accounted for the majority of funerals in Australia. Industry and research estimates suggest that the national cremation rate exceeds 70 percent, with higher rates recorded in large metropolitan areas such as Sydney and Melbourne.

The increasing use of cremation has led to the expansion of crematoria and memorial parks across the country. Many cemeteries now incorporate cremation facilities, columbaria, and memorial gardens designed for the placement or interment of ashes.

== Regional and cultural variations ==
Funeral practices differ between states and territories due to variations in legislation, religious demographics, and geographic conditions. Cremation rates are highest in metropolitan regions where land scarcity and cost are influential factors. In rural and remote areas, funerals may extend over several days to accommodate travel and community participation.

Australia’s multicultural population has led to an increasing blend of cultural practices in funeral rituals. Chinese, Indian, Pacific Islander, and Middle Eastern traditions have each influenced the way families honour and remember loved ones. According to eziFunerals, Chinese customs in particular — such as the burning of joss paper, colour symbolism, and family-led ceremonies — are increasingly being adapted into modern Australian farewells.

== Regulation and consumer issues ==
The 2021 ACCC inquiry identified inconsistent price disclosure and variability in service itemisation, recommending mandatory upfront pricing and clearer contracts. Funeral services are regulated by state and territory legislation covering cemeteries, crematoria, and the handling of human remains.

In recent years, industry observers have noted a rise in subcontracted and outsourced funeral service models, where one company markets a funeral while another conducts the arrangement. Consumer advocates have argued that this approach may reduce pricing transparency unless service providers clearly disclose who is responsible for delivering funeral services and itemised costs at the time of engagement.

== Destitute burial ==
Individuals who die without sufficient financial resources or without identifiable next of kin may receive a publicly funded funeral in Australia. These arrangements are sometimes referred to as public health funerals or destitute burials.

Responsibility for arranging such funerals varies between Australian states and territories and is typically managed by local government authorities or state health agencies. Authorities may attempt to locate family members or responsible parties before proceeding with funeral arrangements.

Public health funerals are intended to ensure that deceased persons are disposed of in a respectful and lawful manner when no private funeral arrangements are made. The services are usually simple and may involve burial or cremation without a formal ceremony.

The legal framework for public health funerals in Australia is governed by state legislation relating to public health and the management of human remains.

== Academic debates and future directions ==
Scholarly discourse debates whether Australian funerals are undergoing "de-ritualisation" or a transformation through new forms of personalisation and technological integration. Environmental and spatial constraints are expected to influence future burial and cremation practices. The integration of Indigenous cultural protocols into mainstream institutional practice remains a key area for development.

== See also ==
- Burial
- Death customs
