= Simon Palfrey =

British academic

Simon Palfrey is an English Scholar at Oxford University and a Fellow in English at Brasenose College, Oxford University. He specialises in Shakespeare and Renaissance literature.

== Life and career ==
Palfrey was born in Hobart, Tasmania, Australia, grew up in Australia and was a Rhodes Scholar at Oxford University. He is known for his approach to Shakespeare's work, in which he discusses the dynamism of the playwright's language, its psychological effects and the actorly and bodily decisions generated by word-use.

His book Doing Shakespeare has been called "an original and long-overdue resource for theatre scholar-artists." It was listed as an "International Book of the Year" in 2004 by the Times Literary Supplement. In the TLS, Jonathan Bate said that although the work was "sometimes wayward," the book was 'always provocative of serious thought'. Bate could think 'of no critic since Empson who has teased out so much so lucidly and (usually) so persuasively from the intricacies of Shakespearean language." Palfrey's earlier book, Late Shakespeare: A New World of Worlds was described by Ann Jennalie Cook as 'among the most significant books of the year', 'a sweeping vision of these plays' language...indispensable for its subject', and as "a valuable contribution to the political reading of Renaissance literary forms" which challenged the traditional reading of Shakespeare's four romances. Russ McDonald writing in Shakespeare Quarterly described Late Shakespeare as "original, quirky, occasionally brilliant, and almost always demanding."

Palfrey's 2007 collaboration with theatre historian Tiffany Stern, Shakespeare in Parts, was awarded the 2009 Medieval and Renaissance Drama Society's David Bevington Prize for best new book. Palfrey's latest work is a collaborative novel written with fellow Shakespeare scholar Ewan Fernie.

== Publications ==
- Late Shakespeare: A New World of Worlds, Oxford University Press, (1997), ISBN 978-0-19-818689-2.
- Doing Shakespeare (Arden Shakespeare Third Series), Thomson Learning EMEA, (2004), ISBN 978-1-904271-54-3.
- "Macbeth and Kierkegaard" in Shakespeare Survey, Volume 57: "Macbeth and its Afterlife," (2004), Cambridge, Edited by: Peter Holland.
- 'The Rape of Marina', *Shakespeare International Yearbook 2007*
- Shakespeare in Parts, co-written with Tiffany Stern (2007, by Oxford University Press). ISBN 978-0-19-927205-1
- Poor Tom: Living King Lear, University of Chicago Press, (2014), ISBN 978-0-226-15064-2

Editor, with Ewan Fernie, of Shakespeare Now! series:

- Shakespeare Thinking by Philip Davis, (2007).
- Shakespeare Inside: The Bard Behind Bars by Amy Scott-Douglass, (2007).
- Godless Shakespeare by Eric Mallin, (2007).
- To Be or Not to Be by Douglas Bruster, (2007)
- Shakespearean Metaphysics, by Michael Witmore (2008)
- Shakespeare's Modern Collaborators, by Lukas Erne (2008)
- Shakespeare's Double Helix, by henry S. Turner (2008)
