= Jonathan Dollimore =

British philosopher and critic (born 1948)

- Born: 1948 (age 77–78); Leighton Buzzard, Bedfordshire, England
- Other name: Jonathan G Dollimore
- Education: Keele University; Bedford College, London
- Occupations: Philosopher, critic and academic

Jonathan Gregory Dollimore (born 1948) is a British philosopher and critic in the fields of Renaissance literature (especially drama), gender studies, queer theory (queer studies), history of ideas, death studies, decadence, and cultural theory. He is the author of four academic books, a memoir, and numerous academic articles. With Alan Sinfield he was the co-editor of and key contributor to Political Shakespeare, and the co-originator of the critical practice known as cultural materialism. Dollimore is credited with making major interventions in debates on sexuality and desire, Renaissance literary culture, art and censorship, and cultural theory.

== Early life ==
Dollimore was born in 1948 in Leighton Buzzard, England. After leaving school at the age of 15, he took a job operating a lathe in a car factory, and spent much of his spare time riding motorbikes at high speeds. At 16, he suffered a serious road accident that necessitated a lengthy stay in hospital; it was during this period of convalescence that Dollimore decided to become a writer. He spent four years as a reporter for a local newspaper before taking an A-level in English at Luton College of Technology, followed by a BA degree in English and Philosophy at Keele University. Dollimore achieved first-class honours, but found the teaching, particularly of philosophy, uninspiring. He later wrote: "I was discovering back then that philosophy was not only more important than the academic study of it allowed, but that as a subject it needed to be turned against the academy which diminished it. That became the basis of everything I subsequently wrote."

== Career ==
In 1974, Dollimore began a PhD at Bedford College, University of London (now part of Royal Holloway, University of London), but abandoned his projected thesis after little more than a year when he took up a lectureship at the University of Sussex. However, he was awarded his PhD in 1984 when the University of London allowed him to submit his first book, Radical Tragedy: Religion, Ideology, and Power in the Drama of Shakespeare and his Contemporaries, in lieu of a thesis. To meet university regulations, the book was required to be housed inside a cardboard box identical in colour and size to a conventional thesis. In 1991, now a Reader at the University of Sussex, Dollimore co-founded with his then-partner Alan Sinfield the Centre for the Study of Sexual Dissidence, which, as he later recalled, was met with horror by some commentators: "One Tory MP said that the University should be shut down, disinfected AND subjected to the financial equivalent of carpet bombing. An opinion writer in The Sun newspaper agreed, but added that the carpet bombs should be real". Dollimore later became Professor of English and Related Literature at the University of York.

=== Major works ===
Radical Tragedy: Religion, Ideology and Power in the Drama of Shakespeare and his Contemporaries (1984, 2nd edition 1989, 3rd edition 2004, reissued 3rd edition 2010)

In his first book, Dollimore argues that the humanist critical tradition has distorted for modern readers the actual radical function of Early Modern English drama, which had to do with "a critique of ideology, the demystification of political and power relations and the decentring of 'man'".

Political Shakespeare: Essays in Cultural Materialism, edited with Alan Sinfield (1985, 2nd edition 1994)

Treading the same path as Radical Tragedy, this collection of essays by leading writers on Shakespeare has as its goal to replace our idea of a timeless, humane and civilising Shakespeare with a Shakespeare anchored in the social, political and ideological conflicts of his historical moment. Dollimore contributes three essays to the expanded second edition, including an introduction that explains and defends his approach. Also included are essays by Stephen Greenblatt, Alan Sinfield and Kathleen McLuskie.

Sexual Dissidence (1991, 2nd edition 2018)

In Sexual Dissidence, Dollimore sets out "to retrieve lost histories of perversion", in part by tracing the term "perverse" back to its etymological origins in Latin and its epistemological origins in Augustine. Oscar Wilde takes centre stage, but the book also discusses writers including André Gide, Freud, and Foucault, and topics such as desire, transgression, homophobia, and cross-dressing. The second edition includes a new introduction that locates the book in its original contexts, and also offers a reading of Wilde's novel Dorian Gray and an outline of a critical practice, derived from cultural materialism, whereby literature is used to "read" philosophy rather than vice verse.

Death, Desire, and Loss (1998)

In a wide-ranging survey from Anaximander to AIDS, Dollimore presses his case that the drive to relinquish the self has always lurked within Western notions of identity and can be found above all, "perversely, lethally, ecstatically" in sexuality.

Sex, Literature, and Censorship (2001)

Dollimore explores the relationship between criticism, ethics and aesthetics, centring his discussion on literature’s "dangerous knowledge". He calls for a shift in critical values from theoretical learning to experiential knowledge, endorsing a criticism capable of "being historically and imaginatively inside a perspective which one is also critically resisting; struggling to escape its failures while seeing that one has already been changed by it". The book contains a lengthy discussion of what Dollimore calls "wishful theory", and the development of his idea of the daemonic: the inhumane values found at the heart of literature and civilization that traditional critics have ignored.

Desire: A Memoir (2017, 2nd expanded edition 2021)

In this autobiographical work, Dollimore pays particular attention to sex and identity, depression and loss, and the relationship between academic work and gay subcultures in the United Kingdom, Australia, and New York. In a review, Andrew Gibson writes "Desire may tell us more about what was at stake in our culture, especially British culture, from the late sixties to the early nineties (the period the memoir covers) than many another book that may address the theme in a more deliberate and learned fashion".

=== Ideas ===
Cultural materialism

As defined and originated by Dollimore and Alan Sinfield, cultural materialism is a way of reading that, at its simplest, can be defined as "a combination of historical context, theoretical method, political commitment and textual analysis". As Christopher Marlow puts it, "Above all else, cultural materialists consider texts from a materialist rather than an idealist perspective. This means rejecting critical clichés such as the idea that Shakespeare’s works demonstrate a revelation of something called 'human nature', and instead paying attention to the actual circumstances in which texts are written and read. Thus where traditional criticism sees Shakespeare’s era as one that comfortably maintained a conservative political status quo, cultural materialism finds evidence of dissent and subversion. Being a materialist also means abandoning the idea that literary criticism exists in a privileged scholarly realm 'above' politics and thus offers unbiased readings of Shakespeare and other literary texts. For cultural materialists, all readings are political readings, not least, of course, their own".

The perverse dynamic

"The perverse dynamic", is one of Dollimore’s most crucial theoretical concepts, first described in Sexual Dissidence, and later applied in Sex, Literature, and Censorship. The "perverse dynamic" is the production of perversion from within the very social structures that are offended by it and often enforce against it. The perverse "other" turns out not to be the remote alien thing it is supposed to be, enabling a "tracking-back of the 'other' into the 'same'". This return of the suppressed via the proximate Dollimore calls "transgressive reinscription."

Wishful theory

This phrase is used by Dollimore in his later work to refer to versions of cultural criticism that have abandoned "the effort to understand the historical real as we inherit and live it". Playing on Marx’s famous tenet that as human beings "we can make history, but not in conditions of our own choosing", Dollimore remarks that "wishful theory is akin to trying to make history in conditions of our own choosing". In making this point, he reaffirms his commitment to praxis as well as theory.

=== Recent writings ===
In "Civilization and its Darkness" (2012) Dollimore examines Joseph Conrad's novel Heart of Darkness, and explores the relationship between civilisation and the forces that subvert and destroy it. Civilization, Dollimore writes, "is, at some level, profoundly and necessarily limited, focused and exclusionary, built on repressions which remain constitutive." The repressed forces, however, re-emerge intensified, which means that "only the most highly civilised can become truly daemonic." Dollimore also reiterates, from Sex, Literature and Censorship, his belief that "to take art seriously is to recognise that it has the power to compromise both our morality and our humanity."

Dollimore, in his extended "Foreword" to Ewan Fernie's book The Demonic (2012), discusses the modern state of literary criticism. He dislikes the "obscurantist" tendencies of some critical and cultural theory, but he also deplores the fact that "historicism in one newish form or another, has become a new orthodoxy". The most committed historicism, Dollimore claims: "tends towards a policing of the play [or whatever else] against interpretation. It doesn't just avoid questions of value, but represses them; in other words it's a contextualising which is also, and more fundamentally, a containment."

A call for a new sort of spiritually intense living runs through Dollimore's recent writings. For example, in his "Foreword", he counsels that "authenticity is more often than not outside the doxa", and states: "almost everything that is done, including what we ourselves do, be it at the macro or the micro level, could and should be done more authentically, more honestly, more meaningfully, more truthfully."

In an interview with David Jonathan Y. Bayot published as Jonathan Dollimore in Conversation (2013), Dollimore discusses theory, aesthetics, ethics, and politics, and considers how to mobilize them alongside desire and spirituality for a radical materialist practice. He explains the continuing relevance of cultural materialism, and defends it against what he calls "dogged misunderstanding" of some of its theoretical positions.

In "Then and Now" (2014), Dollimore reflects upon cultural materialism and the publication of Political Shakespeare, and goes on to examine the question of human nature through the lens of evolutionary biology. He advises that literary scholars take science seriously, and considers the possibility that culture itself may be counter-evolutionary.

== Personal life ==
In the 1970s and 1980s, Dollimore shared a cottage in Shropshire with his partner, Alan Sinfield.

== Selected publications ==
- Dollimore, Jonathan (1983) (with Alan Sinfield). The Selected Plays of John Webster: The White Devil, The Duchess of Malfi, The Devil's Law Case. Cambridge University Press. ISBN 978-0-521-27103-5.
- Dollimore, Jonathan (1994) (with Alan Sinfield). Political Shakespeare: Essays in Cultural Materialism. Cornell University Press (North America); Manchester University Press (UK). ISBN 978-0-8014-8243-4 (N. Am.); 978-0719043529 (UK).
- Dollimore, Jonathan (1998). Death, Desire and Loss in Western Culture. Routledge. ISBN 978-0-415-92174-9.
- Dollimore, Jonathan (2001). Sex, Literature, and Censorship. Polity Press. ISBN 978-0-7456-2763-2.
- Dollimore, Jonathan (2010). Radical Tragedy: Religion, Ideology and Power in the Drama of Shakespeare and His Contemporaries. Rev. 3d edn. Basingstoke, UK: Palgrave Macmillan. ISBN 978-0-230-24313-2.
- Dollimore, Jonathan (2011). "On Leaving" in Crrritic! (eds. John Schad and Oliver Tearle, Sussex Academic Press). ISBN 978-1845193829.
- Dollimore, Jonathan (2012). "Civilization and its Darkness", in Conrad's Heart of Darkness and Contemporary Thought: Revisiting the Horror with Lacoue-Labarthe (ed. Nidesh Lawtoo, Bloomsbury Academic). ISBN 978-1441101006.
- Dollimore, Jonathan (2012). "Foreword" to Ewan Fernie, The Demonic (Routledge). ISBN 978-0415690256.
- Dollimore, Jonathan (2013). Jonathan Dollimore in Conversation (with David Jonathan Y. Bayot). Manila: De La Salle University Publishing House (Philippines). ISBN 978-971-555-586-9.
- Dollimore, Jonathan (2014). "Then and Now." Critical Survey 26.3: 61–82. doi:10.3167/cs.2014.260309.
- Dollimore, Jonathan (2018). Sexual Dissidence. 2nd edn. Oxford: Oxford University Press. ISBN 978-0-19-882705-4.
- Dollimore, Jonathan (2021). Desire: A Memoir. 2nd edn. Lanham, MD: Rowman & Littlefield. ISBN 978-1-78661-500-8.
