= Graham Holderness =

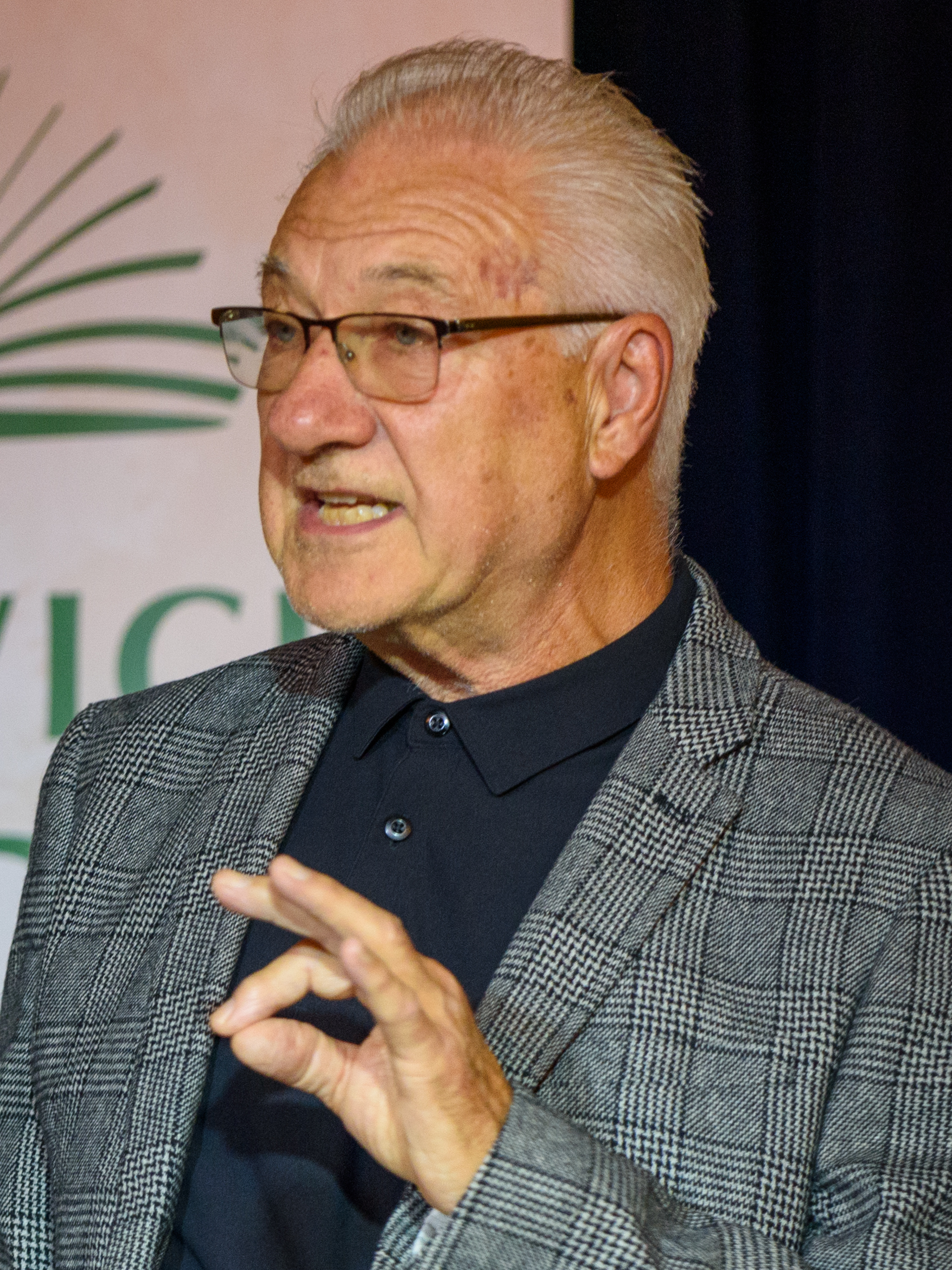
Holderness in 2022

Graham Holderness is a writer and critic who has published as author or editor 60 books, mostly on Shakespeare, and hundreds of chapters and articles of criticism, theory and theology. He was one of the founders of British Cultural materialism, a pioneer of critical-creative writing, and a significant contributor to interdisciplinary work in Literature and Theology.

== Life ==
Holderness was born in Meanwood, Leeds, where he was educated at local state schools, including Leeds Modern School. He attended Jesus College, Oxford, where he obtained a First Class Degree in English language and literature. and a postgraduate degree in 19th-century literature and society. He obtained an MPhil degree in literature from the Open University, and a PhD in drama from the University of Surrey. He also has a higher doctorate (D.Litt.) in English, and a doctorate in literature and theology. During his academic career he has taught at the Open University, Oxford, Roehampton and Hertfordshire, becoming its professor of English.

== Fields ==
He is acknowledged as a formative contributor to a number of branches of Shakespeare criticism and theory:

- criticism of Shakespeare's history plays, from Shakespeare’s History (Macmillan, 1985) to Shakespeare: the Histories (Palgrave, 2001);
- cultural criticism, from his edited collection The Shakespeare Myth (Manchester University Press, 1988) to Cultural Shakespeare (University of Hertfordshire Press, 2001) and Shakespeare and Venice (Ashgate, 2009);
- study of Shakespeare in film and television, from his contribution to Political Shakespeare (Manchester University Press, 1986) to Visual Shakespeare: (University of Hertfordshire Press, 2002);
- textual theory and criticism, from his edited series Shakespearean Originals to Textual Shakespeare: Writing and the Word (University of Hertfordshire Press, 2003).

== Research and writings ==
Holderness published the first full-length Marxist study of D. H. Lawrence, D. H. Lawrence: History, Ideology and Fiction (Macmillan, 1982). A pioneer of "cultural Materialism", Holderness demonstrates "an interest in historical cultural change by evaluating contemporary television and film versions of Shakespeare's plays or by examining the image of Shakespeare fostered by our British educational system." In doing so, he seeks to counter "conservative views of early post-Second World War theatres and academics and to raise awareness that all textual appropriation and examination have a political dimension."

He has published pioneering studies in Arabic adaptations of Shakespeare, culminating in The Arab Shakespeare Trilogy by Sulayman Al Bassam (Methuen Drama, 2014), and research in Christian literature and theology, in journals such as Harvard Theological Review, Journal for the Study of the New Testament, Literature and Theology, and Renaissance and Reformation.

Graham Holderness is also a novelist, poet and dramatist. His novel The Prince of Denmark was published in 2001; his poetry collection Craeft received a Poetry Book Society award in 2002; and his play Wholly Writ was in 2011 performed at Shakespeare's Globe, and by Royal Shakespeare Company actors in Stratford-upon-Avon.

His more recent work has pioneered methods of critical-creative writing, exemplified by his innovative factual-fictional biography Nine Lives of William Shakespeare (Bloomsbury/Arden Shakespeare, 2011), which pairs critical chapters on biographical themes, with short stories on the same topic, written in styles as diverse as those of Dan Brown and Arthur Conan Doyle, Ernest Hemingway and Jonathan Swift. Extending these methods, and published in 2014, are Tales from Shakespeare: Creative Collisions (Cambridge University Press, June 2014), which includes a story about Shakespeare's Richard II being performed on board the ship the Red Dragon during the Third Voyage of the East India Company, and a re-writing of Coriolanus as a James Bond adventure; and Re-writing Jesus: Christ in 20th Century Fiction and Film (Bloomsbury, November 2014), which incorporates a new historical life of Jesus, Ecce Homo. May 2014 sees the publication of a historical fantasy novel on Shakespeare and the Gunpowder Plot, Black and Deep Desires: William Shakespeare Vampire Hunter (Top Hat Books, 2014).

His most recent book is The Faith of William Shakespeare (Lion Hudson, November 2016).

== Positions ==
Holderness is General Editor of the peer-reviewed journal Critical Survey; an elected Fellow of the English Association, the Royal Society of Arts, and the Royal Society of Medicine.

== Personal life ==
Holderness is an Anglican Christian. He is a sub-deacon at the Church of St Michael and All Angels, Bedford Park, an Anglo-Catholic Church of England church.
