= Death, Desire and Loss in Western Culture =

1998 book by Jonathan Dollimore

- Cover of the first edition
- Author: Jonathan Dollimore
- Language: English
- Series: Literary Studies
- Subject: Death and culture
- Publisher: Routledge
- Publication date: 1998
- Publication place: United Kingdom
- Media type: Print (Hardcover and Paperback)
- Pages: 384
- ISBN: 978-0415921749

Death, Desire and Loss in Western Culture is a 1998 philosophy book by the social theorist Jonathan Dollimore. The book describes the influence of the death obsession in western culture. Dollimore's analysis is heavily influenced by early modern culture.
