= Death and culture =

Role of death in several cultures

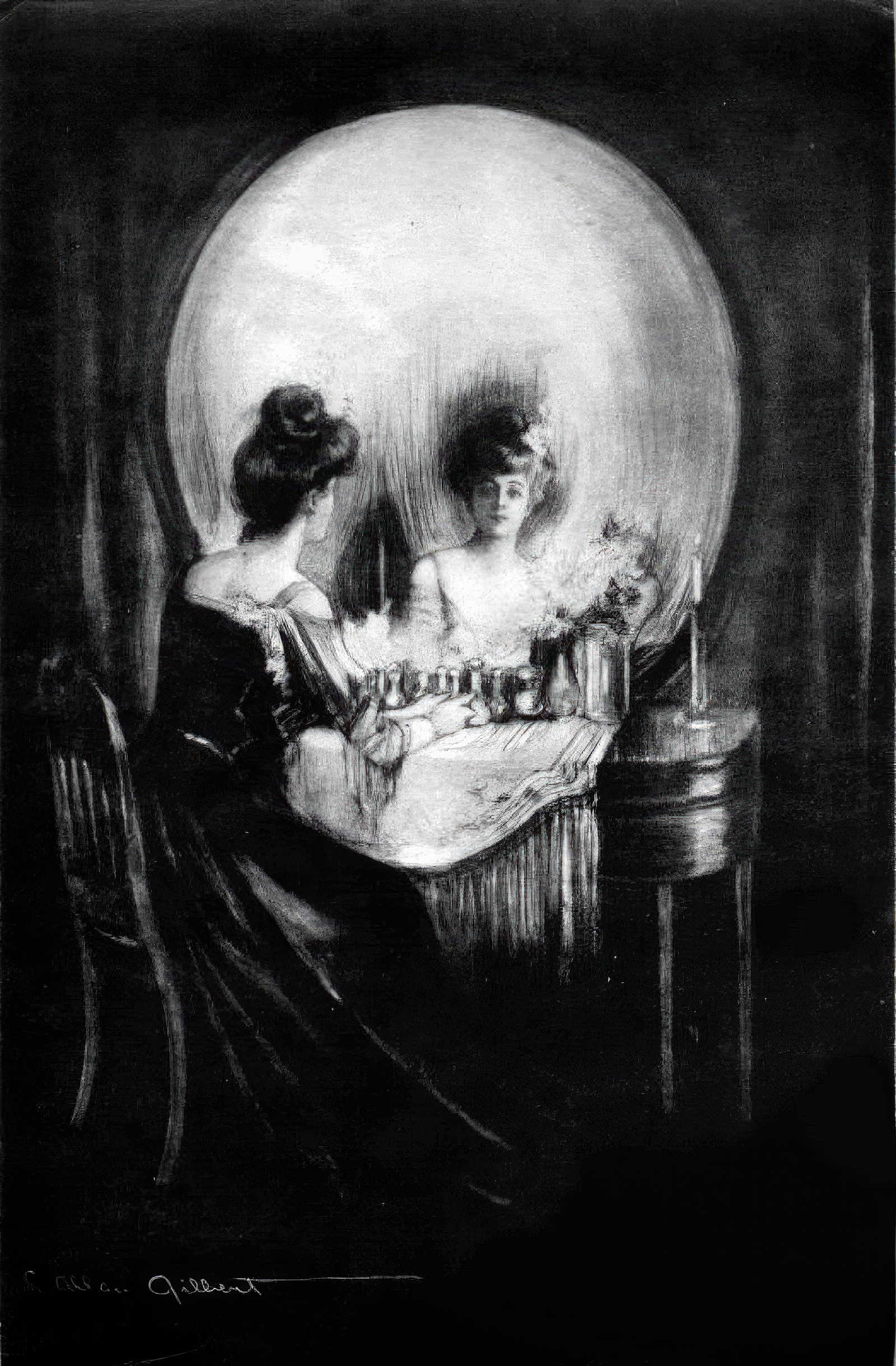
"All Is Vanity" by C. Allan Gilbert, suggesting an intertwining between life and death.

Death is dealt with differently in cultures around the world, and there are ethical issues relating to death, such as martyrdom, suicide and euthanasia. Death refers to the permanent termination of life-sustaining processes in an organism, i.e. when all biological systems of a human being cease to operate. Death and its spiritual ramifications are debated in every manner all over the world. Most civilizations dispose of their dead with rituals developed through spiritual traditions.

== Disposal of remains ==
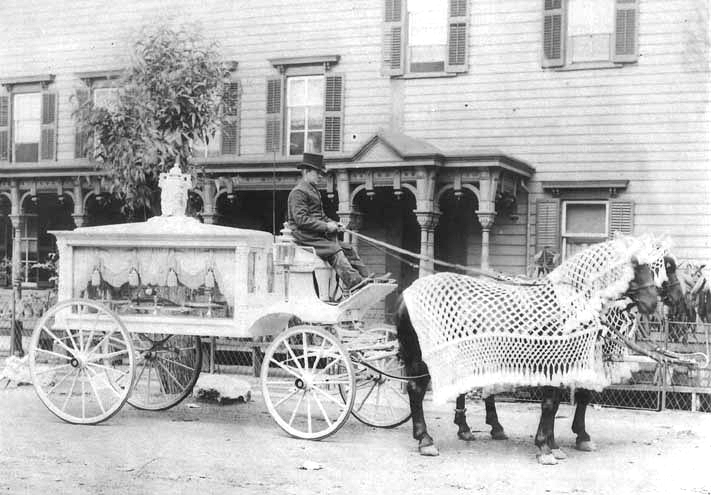
A horse-drawn hearse with driver, circa 1900, Scranton, Pennsylvania, USA.

In most cultures, after the last offices have been performed and before the onset of significant decay, relations or friends arrange for ritual disposition of the body, either by destruction, or by preservation, or in a secondary use. In the US, this frequently means either cremation or interment in a tomb.

There are various methods of destroying human remains, depending on religious or spiritual beliefs, and upon practical necessity. Cremation is a very old and quite common custom. For some people, the act of cremation exemplifies the belief of the Christian concept of "ashes to ashes". On the other hand, in India, cremation and disposal of the bones in the river Ganges (considered by many in India, as well as Hindus around the world to be sacred) is common. Another method is sky burial, which involves placing the body of the deceased on high ground (a mountain) and leaving it for birds of prey to dispose of, as in Tibet. In some religious views, birds of prey are carriers of the soul to the heavens. Such practice may also have originated from pragmatic environmental issues, such as conditions in which the terrain (as in Tibet) is too stony or hard to dig, or in which there are few trees around to burn. As the local religion of Buddhism, in the case of Tibet, believes that the body after death is only an empty shell, there are more practical ways than burial of disposing of a body, such as leaving it for animals to consume. In some fishing or marine communities, mourners may put the body into the water, in what is known as burial at sea. Several mountain villages have a tradition of hanging the coffin in woods.

Since ancient times, in some cultures efforts have been made to slow, or largely stop the body's decay processes before burial, as in mummification or embalming. This process may be done before, during or after a funeral ceremony. Many cultures have locations in which graves are usually grouped together in a plot of land, called a cemetery or graveyard. Burials can be arranged by a funeral home, mortuary, undertaker or by a religious body such as a church or the community's burial society, a charitable or voluntary body charged with these duties. The preserved or unpreserved body may then be interred in a grave, crypt, sepulchre, or ossuary, a mound or barrow, or a monumental surface structure such as a mausoleum (exemplified by the Taj Mahal) or a pyramid (as exemplified by the Great Pyramid of Giza). In some cases, a part of the remains may be preserved; in early ancient Greece, remains were cremated, but the bones preserved and interred.

Recently changes in culture and technology have led to new options. A late 20th century alternative is an ecological burial. This is a sequence of deep-freezing, pulverisation by vibration, freeze-drying, removing metals, and burying the resulting powder, which has 30% of the body mass. Alternatively, a green burial is not a new process, but a very old one involving burying the unpreserved remains in a wood coffin or casket, which will naturally decompose, and thus not permanently take up land. A very different option from that is a space burial, which uses a rocket to launch the cremated remains of a body into orbit. This has been done at least 150 times. However, most of these remains are not complete, nor launched permanently into space, due to cost. Two partial permanent space burials are those of astronomer Eugene Shoemaker, a part of whose remains were launched to the Moon, and Clyde Tombaugh, the astronomer who discovered Pluto, part of whose remains travel with the New Horizons spacecraft, which has/will leave the Solar System. Other remains have been launched only into Earth orbit, and either recovered, or left to be lost.

Cryonics is the process of cryopreservating of a body to liquid nitrogen temperature to stop the natural decay processes that occur after death. Those practicing cryonics hope that future technology will allow the legally dead person to be restored to life when and if science is able to cure all disease, rejuvenate people to a youthful condition and repair damage from the cryopreservation process itself. As of 2007, there were over 150 people in some form of cryopreservation at one of the two largest cryonics organizations, Alcor Life Extension Foundation and the Cryonics Institute.

In some nations whole body donations have been encouraged by medical schools to be used in medical education and similar training, and in research. In the United States, these gifts, along with organ donations, are governed by the Uniform Anatomical Gift Act. In addition to wishing to benefit others, individuals might choose to donate their bodies to avoid the cost of funeral arrangements; however, willed body programs often encourage families to make alternative arrangements for burial if the body is not accepted.

== Grief and mourning ==
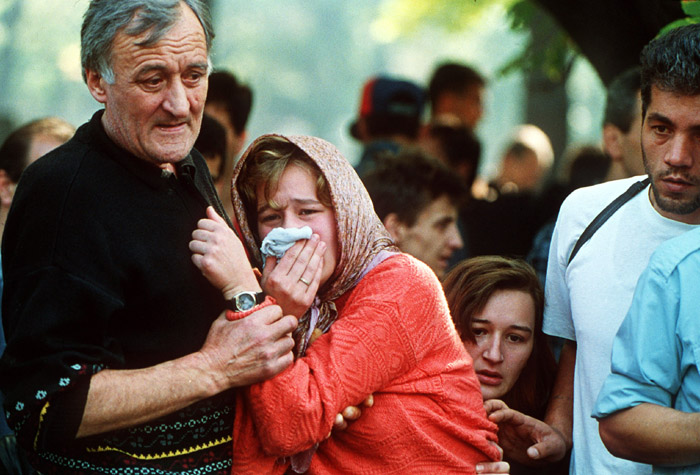
A funeral during the Siege of Sarajevo in 1992.

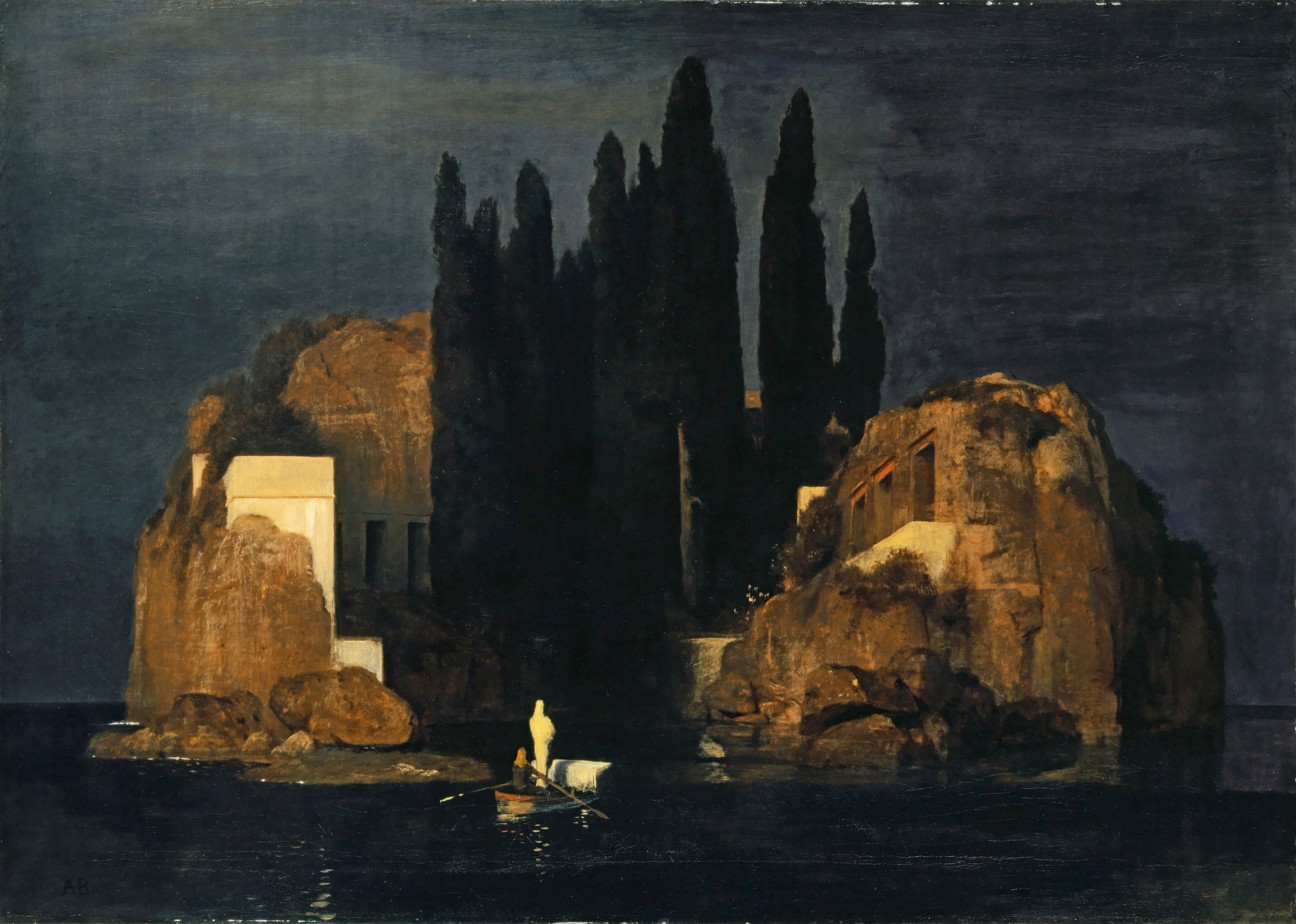
Isle of the Dead (Arnold Böcklin, 1880).

Grief is a multi-faceted response to loss. Although conventionally focused on the emotional response to loss, it also has physical, cognitive, behavioral, social and philosophical dimensions. Common to human experience is the death of a loved one, be they friend, family, or other. While the terms are often used interchangeably, bereavement often refers to the state of loss, and grief to the reaction to loss. Response to loss is varied and researchers have moved away from conventional views of grief (that is, that people move through an orderly and predictable series of responses to loss) to one that considers the wide variety of responses that are influenced by personality, family, culture, and spiritual and religious beliefs and practices.

Bereavement, while a normal part of life for most people, carries a degree of risk when limited support is available. Severe reactions to loss may carry over into familial relations and cause trauma for children, spouses and any other family members. Issues of personal faith and beliefs may also face challenge, as bereaved persons reassess personal definitions in the face of great pain. While many who grieve are able to work through their loss independently, accessing additional support from bereavement professionals may promote the process of healing. Individual counseling, professional support groups or educational classes, and peer-lead support groups are primary resources available to the bereaved. In some regions local hospice agencies may be an important first contact for those seeking bereavement support.

Mourning is the process of and practices surrounding death related grief. The word is also used to describe a cultural complex of behaviours in which the bereaved participate or are expected to participate. Customs vary between different cultures and evolve over time, though many core behaviors remain constant. Wearing dark, sombre clothes is one practice followed in many countries, though other forms of dress are also seen. Those most affected by the loss of a loved one often observe a period of grieving, marked by withdrawal from social events and quiet, respectful behavior. People may also follow certain religious traditions for such occasions.

The date or anniversary of death of an important person such as a local leader, monarch, or religious figure, may be mourned. State mourning may occur on such an occasion. Some traditions have given way to less strict practices, though many customs and traditions continue to be followed.

=== Animal loss ===
Animal loss is the loss of a pet or a non-human animal to which one has become emotionally bonded. Though sometimes trivialized by those who have not experienced it themselves, it can be an intense loss, depending on how close one was to the animal.

== Legal aspects ==
=== Settlement of legal entity ===
Aside from the physical disposition of the corpse, the estate of a person must be settled. This includes all of the person's legal rights and obligations, such as assets and debts. Depending on the jurisdiction, intestacy laws or a will may determine the final disposition of the estate. A legal process, such as probate, will guide these proceedings.

In English law, administration of an estate on death arises if the deceased is legally intestate. In United States law, the term Estate Administration is used. When a person dies leaving a will appointing an executor, and that executor validly disposes of the property of the deceased, then the estate will go to probate. However, if no will is left, or the will is invalid or incomplete in some way, then administrators must be appointed. They perform a similar role to the executor of a will but, where there are no instructions in a will, the administrators must distribute the estate of the deceased according to the rules laid down by statute and the common law.

=== Capital punishment ===
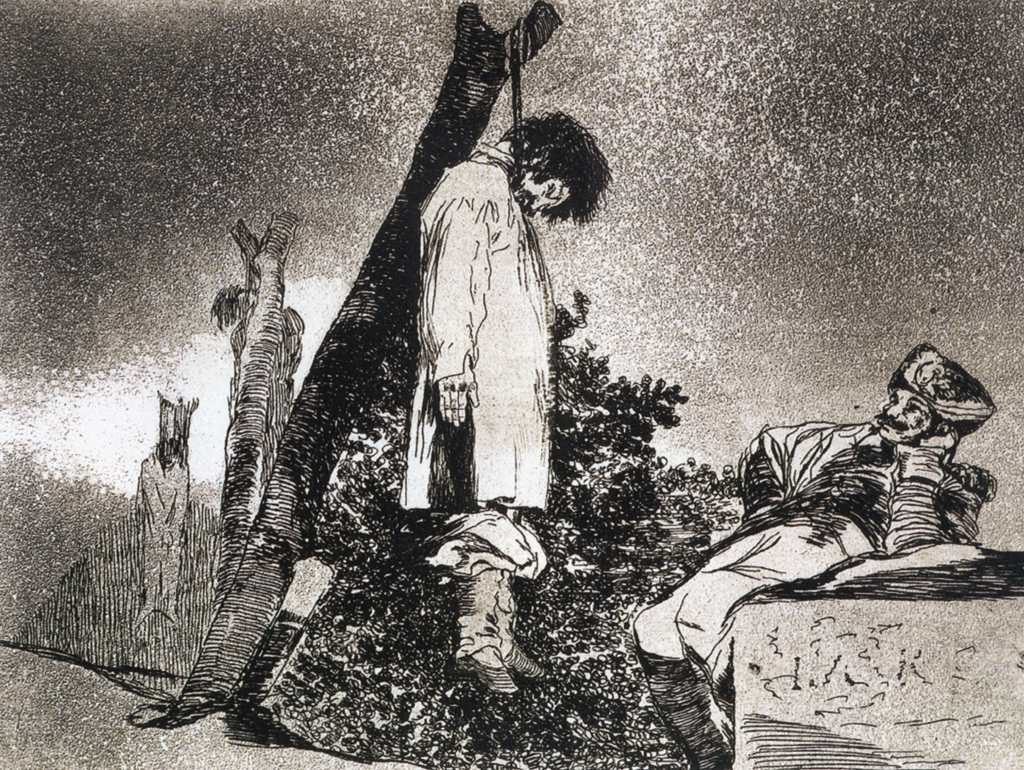
Etching of a hanging by Francisco Goya.

Capital punishment, also known as the death penalty, is the killing of a convicted criminal by the state as punishment for crimes known as capital crimes or capital offences. Historically, the execution of criminals and political opponents was used by nearly all societies—both to punish crime and to suppress political dissent. Among democratic countries around the world, all European (except Belarus) and Latin American states, many Pacific Area states (including Australia, New Zealand and Timor Leste), and Canada have abolished capital punishment, while the majority of the United States, Guatemala, and most of the Caribbean as well as some democracies in Asia (e.g., Japan and India) and Africa (e.g., Botswana and Zambia) retain it. Among nondemocratic countries, the use of the death penalty is common but not universal.

In most places that practice capital punishment today, the death penalty is reserved as punishment for premeditated murder, espionage, treason, or as part of military justice. In some countries, sexual crimes, such as adultery and sodomy, carry the death penalty, as do religious crimes such as apostasy, the formal renunciation of one's religion. In many retentionist countries, drug trafficking is also a capital offense. In China human trafficking and serious cases of corruption are also punished by the death penalty. In militaries around the world courts-martial have imposed death sentences for offenses such as cowardice, desertion, insubordination, and mutiny.

There are five countries that still execute child offenders. Iran accounts for two-thirds of the global total of such executions, and currently has roughly 120 people on death row for crimes committed as juveniles (up from 71 in 2007).

Capital punishment is a very contentious issue. Supporters of capital punishment argue that it deters crime, prevents recidivism, and is an appropriate form of punishment for the crime of murder. Opponents of capital punishment argue that it does not deter criminals more than life imprisonment, violates human rights, leads to executions of some who are wrongfully convicted, and discriminates against minorities and the poor. It seems that both sides make their proper points in supporting one of those decisions, but a compromise can not be reached.

== Warfare ==
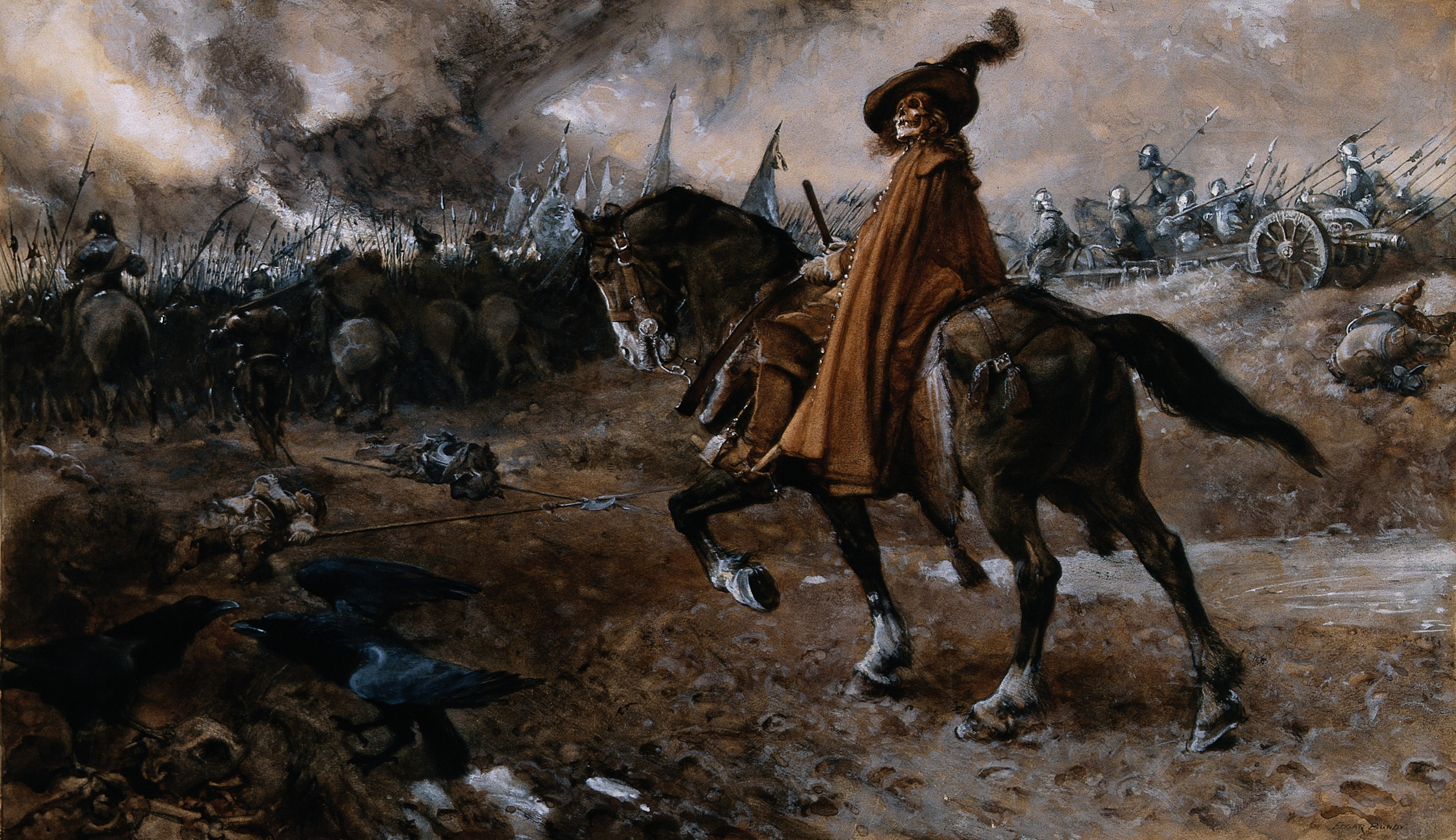
Death as General Rides a Horse on a Battlefield (Edgar Bundy, 1911)

War is a prolonged state of violent, large scale conflict involving two or more groups of people. When and how war originated is a highly controversial topic. Some think war has existed as long as humans, while others believe it began only about 5000 years ago with the rise of the first states; afterward war "spread to peaceful hunter-gatherers and agriculturalists."

Often opposing leaders or governing bodies get other people to fight for them, even if those fighting have no vested interest in the issues fought over. In time it became practical for some people to have warfare as their sole occupation, either as a member of a military force or mercenary. The original cause of war is not always known. Wars may be prosecuted simultaneously in one or more different theatres. Within each theatre, there may be one or more consecutive military campaigns. Individual actions of war within a specific campaign are traditionally called battles, although this terminology is not always applied to contentions in modernity involving aircraft, missiles or bombs alone in the absence of ground troops or naval forces.

The factors leading to war are often complicated and due to a range of issues. Where disputes arise over issues such as sovereignty, territory, resources, ideology and a peaceable resolution is not sought, fails, or is thwarted, war often results.

A war may begin following an official declaration of war in the case of international war, although this has not always been observed either historically or currently. Civil wars and revolutions are not usually initiated by a formal declaration of war, but sometimes a statement about the purposes of the fighting is made. Such statements may be interpreted to be declarations of war, or at least a willingness to fight for a cause.

When members of public services die, especially soldiers, their next of kin are usually given a death notification.

=== Military suicide and suicide attacks ===
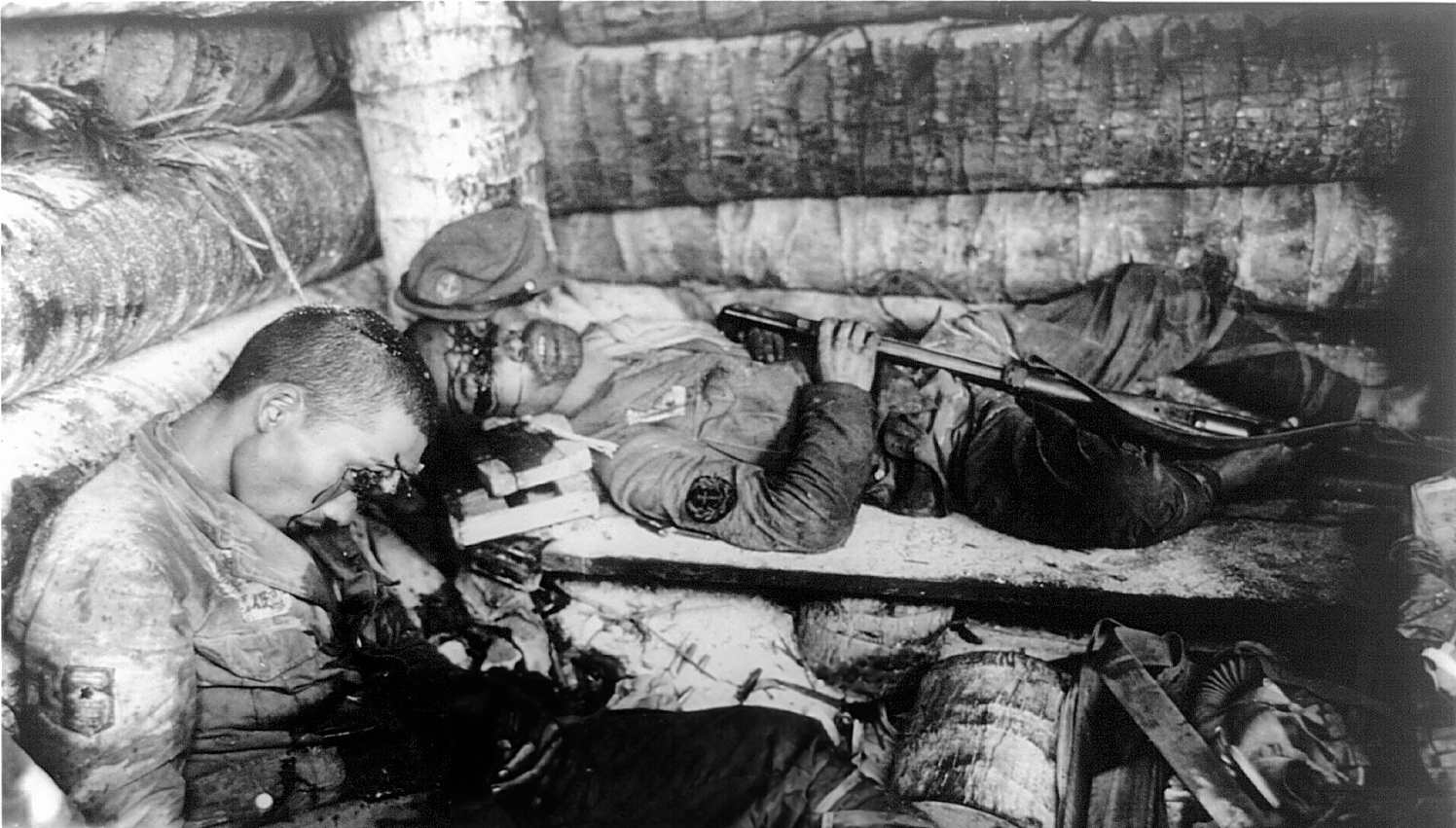
Two Japanese marines who committed suicide rather than surrender at the Battle of Tarawa, 1943

A suicide attack occurs when an individual or group violently sacrifice their own lives for the benefit of their side, their beliefs or out of fear of being captured. In the desperate final days of World War II, many Japanese pilots volunteered for kamikaze missions in an attempt to forestall defeat for the Empire. In Nazi Germany, Luftwaffe squadrons were formed to smash into American B-17s during daylight bombing missions, in order to delay the highly-probable Allied victory, although in this case, inspiration was primarily the Soviet and Polish taran ramming attacks, and death of the pilot was not a desired outcome. Similarly, on April 7, 1945, the Luftwaffe made a last ditch attempt to forstall American bombings against Germany by launching an organized aerial ramming attacks by the Sonderkommando Elbe, with little results. The degree to which such a pilot was engaging in a heroic, selfless action or whether they faced immense social pressure is a matter of historical debate. The Japanese also built one-man "human torpedo" suicide submarines.

However, suicide has been fairly common in warfare throughout history. Soldiers and civilians committed suicide to avoid capture and slavery (including the wave of German and Japanese suicides in the last days of World War II). Commanders committed suicide rather than accept defeat. Spies and officers have committed suicide to avoid revealing secrets under interrogation and/or torture. Behaviour that could be seen as suicidal occurred often in battle. Japanese infantrymen usually fought to the last man, launched "banzai" suicide charges, and committed suicide during the Pacific island battles in World War II. In Saipan and Okinawa, civilians joined in the suicides. Suicidal attacks by pilots were common in the 20th century: the attack by U.S. torpedo planes at the Battle of Midway was very similar to a kamikaze attack.

== Martyrdom ==
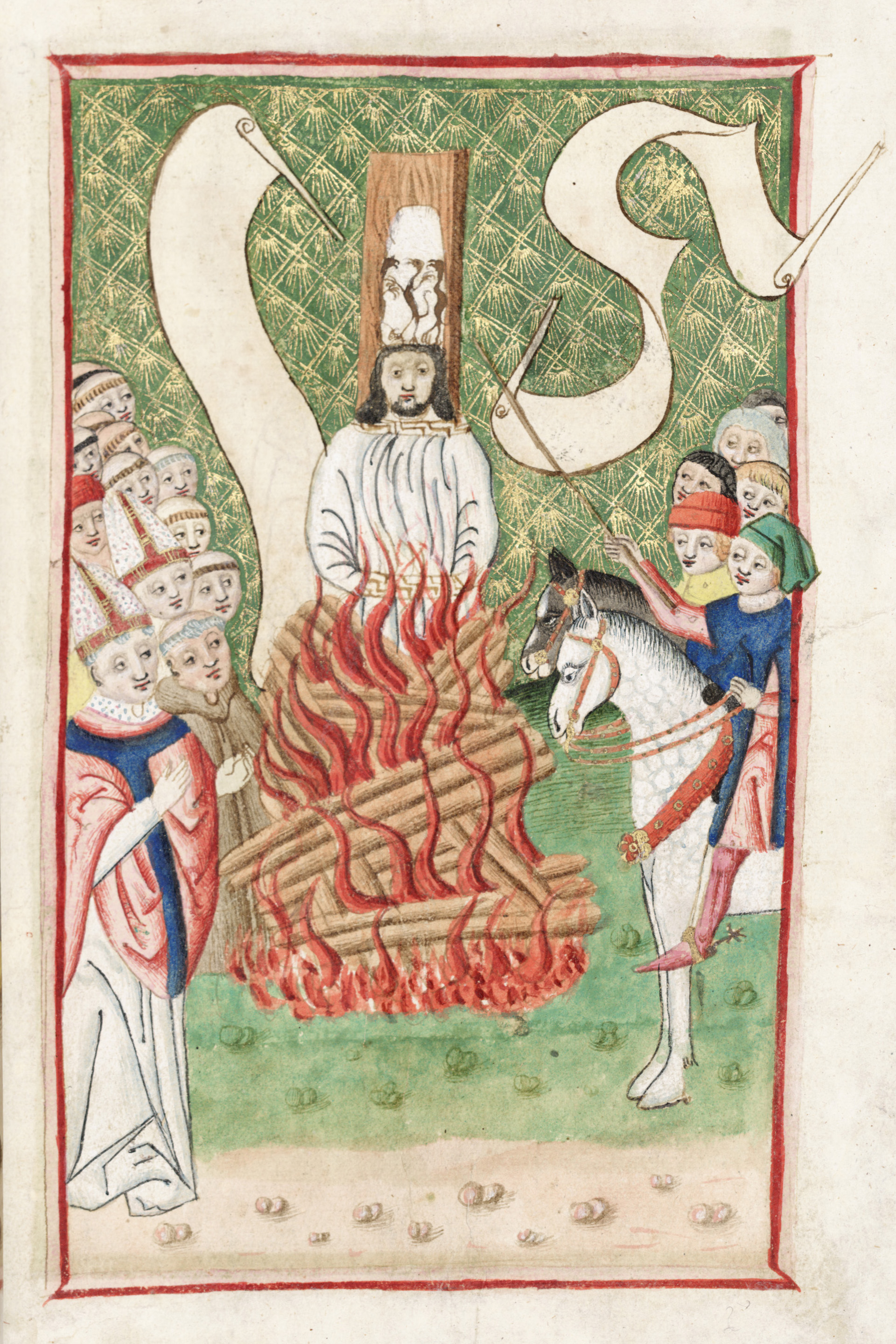
Jan Hus being burned at the stake

A martyr is a person who is put to death or endures suffering for their beliefs, principles or ideology. The death of a martyr or the value attributed to it is called martyrdom. In different belief systems, the criteria for being considered a martyr are different. In the Christian context, a martyr is an innocent person who, without seeking death, is murdered or put to death for his or her religious faith or convictions. An example is the persecution of early Christians in the Roman Empire. Christian martyrs sometimes decline to defend themselves at all, in what they see as an imitation of Jesus' willing sacrifice.

Islam views a martyr as a man or woman who dies while conducting jihad, whether on or off the battlefield (see greater jihad and lesser jihad). However, opinions in the Muslim world vary widely on whether suicide bombers can count as martyrs. Few Muslims believe that suicide bombing can be justified.

Beginning in the early 1990s, martyrdom gained prominence in Palestinian society and culture. Groups such as Hamas and the Palestinian Islamic Jihad view martyrdom as a supreme form of dedication to the Palestinian cause, a perspective that has led to acts of terror, including suicide bombings. This ideology is reflected in various societal elements such as educational materials, media, community events, and ceremonies. It has also played a role in shaping the upbringing and psychological well-being of children, influencing their perceptions from a young age.

Though often religious in nature, martyrdom can be applied to a secular context as well. The term is sometimes applied to those who die or are otherwise severely affected in support of a cause, such as soldiers fighting in a war, doctors fighting an epidemic, or people leading civil rights movements. Proclaiming martyrdom is a common way to draw attention to a cause and garner support.

== Suicide ==
Suicide is the act of intentionally taking one's own life. The term "suicide" can also be used as a noun to refer to a person who has killed himself or herself.

Views on suicide have been influenced by cultural views on existential themes such as religion, honor, and the meaning of life. Most Western and Asian religions—the Abrahamic religions, Buddhism, Hinduism—consider suicide a dishonorable act; in the West it was regarded as a serious crime and offense against God due to religious belief in the sanctity of life. Japanese views on honor and religion led to seppuku being respected as a means to atone for mistakes or failure during the samurai era. In the 20th century suicide in the form of self-immolation has been used as a form of protest. Self-sacrifice (thus saving lives of others) for others is not usually considered suicide.

The predominant view of modern medicine is that suicide is a mental health concern, associated with psychological factors such as the difficulty of coping with depression, inescapable pain or fear, or other mental disorders and pressures. Suicide attempts can be many times interpreted as a "cry for help" and attention, or to express despair and the wish to escape, rather than a genuine intent to die. Most suicides (for various reasons) do not succeed on a first attempt; those who later gain a history of repetitions are significantly more at risk of eventual completion. Nearly a million people worldwide die by suicide annually. While completed suicides are higher in men, women have higher rates for suicide attempts. Elderly males have the highest suicide rate, although rates for young adults have been increasing in recent years.

== Euthanasia ==
Euthanasia is the practice of terminating the life of a person or animal in a painless or minimally painful way in order to prevent suffering or other undesired conditions in life. This may be voluntary or involuntary, and carried out with or without a physician. In a medical environment, it is normally carried out by oral, intravenous or intramuscular drug administration.

Laws around the world vary greatly with regard to euthanasia and are subject to change as people's values shift and better palliative care or treatments become available. It is legal in some nations, while in others it may be criminalized. Due to the gravity of the issue, strict restrictions and proceedings are enforced regardless of legal status. Euthanasia is a controversial issue because of conflicting moral feelings both within a person's own beliefs and between different cultures, ethnicities, religions and other groups. The subject is explored by the mass media, authors, film makers and philosophers, and is the source of ongoing debate and emotion.

=== Animal euthanasia ===
Animal euthanasia is a very common practice and generally considered "merciful". The Suicide in Veterinary Professionals study (Ogden, et al., 2012), found that tolerance to animal euthanasia showed no correlation to tolerance for human euthanasia or the ending of human life (Ogden, et al., 2012). There is a stark difference in opinions regarding Euthanasia in humans versus animals, and that to most the two topics don’t even exist within the same paradigm.

== Customs ==
Death's finality and the relative lack of firm scientific understanding of its processes for most of human history have led to many different traditions and cultural rituals for dealing with death and remembrance. Some superstitions include: If you don't hold your breath while going by a graveyard, you will not be buried; a bird in the house is a sign of a death; and many more. A widely held custom is shutting the eyes of the deceased. In some cultures, the deceased's house was destroyed or burned; in other cultures, the doors and windows were left open to cleanse the house (and allow the spirit to escape.)

== Sacrifices ==
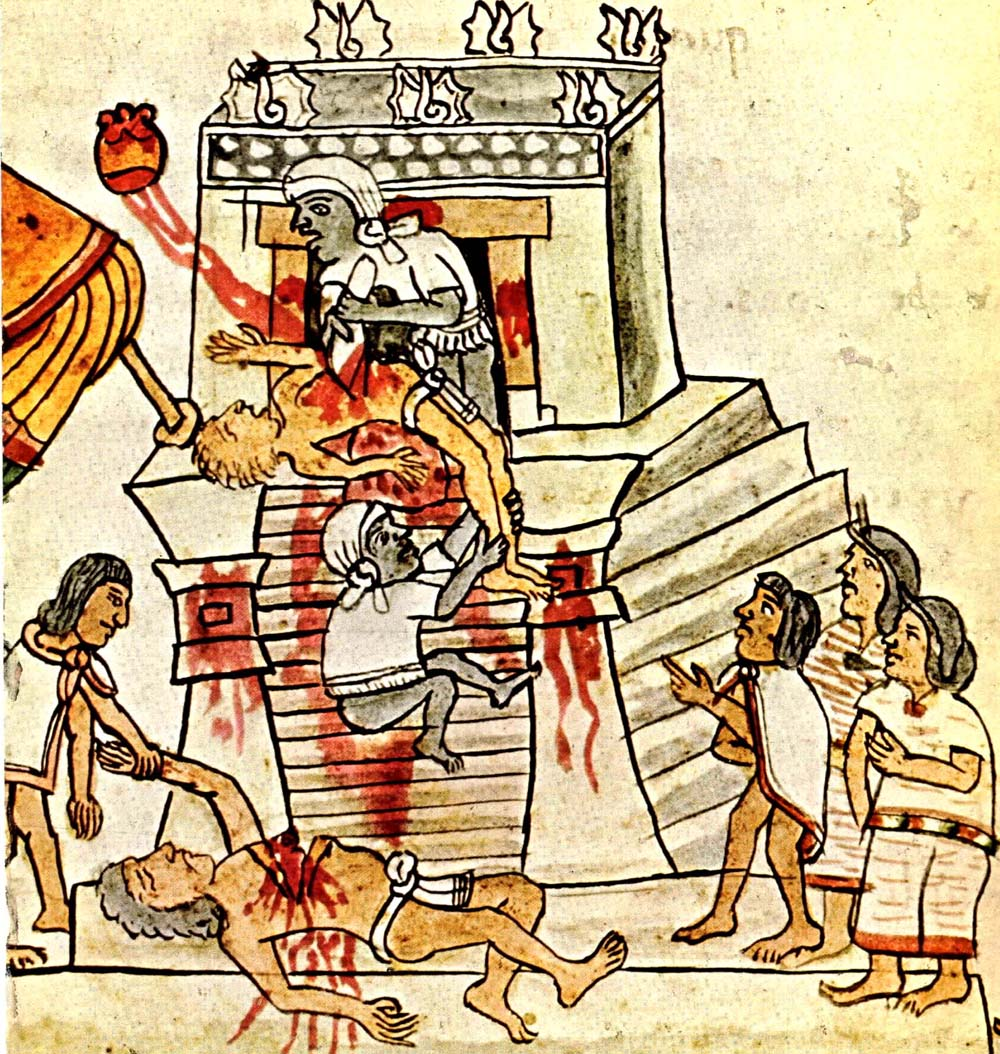
Aztec sacrifices, Codex Mendoza.

Sacrifice includes the practice of offering the lives of animals or people to the gods, as an act of propitiation or worship. The practice of sacrifice is found in the oldest human records, and the archaeological record finds corpses, both animal and human, that show marks of having been sacrificed and have been dated to long before any records. Human sacrifice was practiced in many ancient cultures. The practice has varied between different civilizations, with some like the Aztecs being notorious for their ritual killings, while others have looked down on the practice. Victims ranging from prisoners to infants to virgins were killed to please their gods, suffering such fates as burning, beheading and being buried alive.

Animal sacrifice is the ritual killing of an animal as practiced by many religions as a means of appeasing a god or spiritual being, changing the course of nature or divining the future. Animal sacrifice has occurred in almost all cultures, from the Hebrews to the Greeks and Romans to the Yoruba. Over time human and animal sacrifices have become less common in the world, such that modern sacrifices in the West are rare. The practice of animal sacrifice is still common in Islamic society however, particularly during the festival Eid al-Adha. Affluent Muslims who can afford it sacrifice their best halal domestic animals (usually a cow, but can also be a camel, goat, sheep or ram depending on the region) as a symbol of Abraham's willingness to sacrifice his only son. The sacrificed animals, called aḍḥiya (Arabic: أضحية), known also by the Perso-Arabic term qurbāni, have to meet certain age and quality standards or else the animal is considered an unacceptable sacrifice. This tradition accounts for the slaughter of more than 100 million animals in only two days of Eid. In Pakistan alone nearly 10 million animals are slaughtered on Eid days costing over US$3 billion. Most religions condemn the practice of human sacrifices, and present day laws generally treat them as a criminal matter. Nonetheless, traditional sacrifice rituals are still seen in rural areas where the state monitors less closely.

== Philosophy, religion and mythology ==
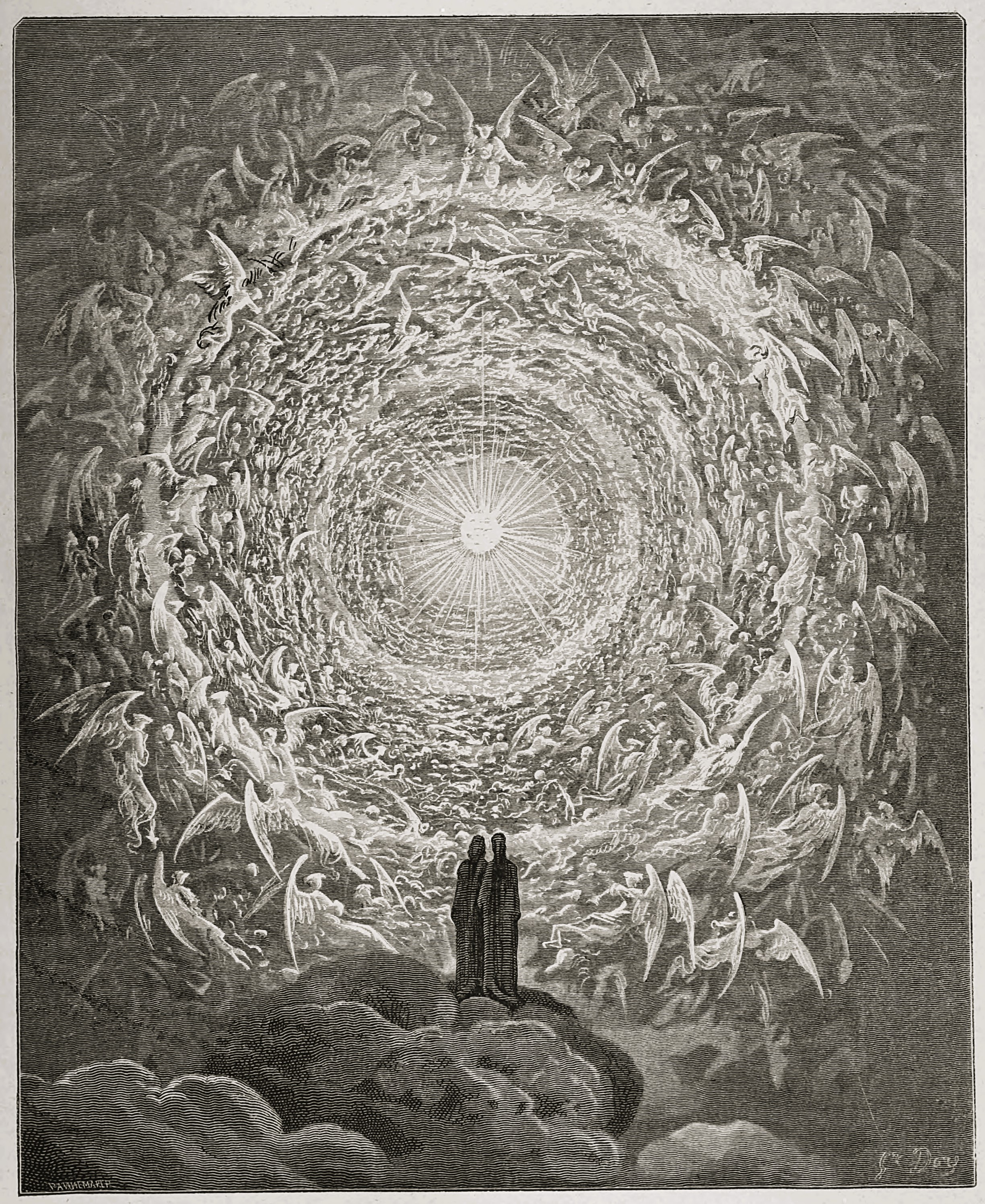
A representation of Paradise

Faith in some form of afterlife is an important aspect of many people's beliefs. For example, one aspect of Hinduism involves belief in a continuing cycle of birth, life, death and rebirth (Samsara) and the liberation from the cycle (Moksha). Eternal return is a non-religious concept proposing an infinitely recurring cyclic universe, which relates to the subject of the afterlife and the nature of consciousness and time. Though various evidence has been advanced in attempts to demonstrate the reality of an afterlife, these claims have never been validated. For this reason, the material or metaphysical existence of an afterlife is considered by many to be a matter outside the scope of science.

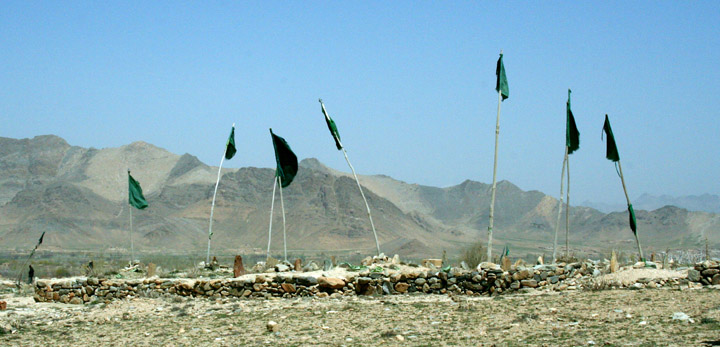
Green flags mark a graveyard in southeast Afghanistan.

Many cultures have incorporated a god of death into their mythology or religion. As death, along with birth, is among the major parts of human life, deities representing these events or passages may often be the most important deities of a religion. In some religions with a single powerful deity as the object of worship, the death deity is an antagonistic deity against which the primary deity struggles.

In polytheistic religions or mythologies, it is common to have a deity who is assigned the function of presiding over death. The inclusion of such a "departmental" deity of death in a religion's pantheon is not necessarily the same as the glorification of death. The latter is commonly condemned by the use of the term "death-worship" in modern political rhetoric. In the theology of monotheistic religions, the one god governs both life and death. However, in practice there are many different rituals and traditions for acknowledging death, which vary according to a number of factors, including geography, politics, traditions and the influence of other religions.

In the Jewish religion, a simple wooden coffin is permitted; flowers in or around the coffin are not allowed. A natural burial (without a coffin) is a normality today in Israel.

Secular humanists often focus on the right to choose how and when a person dies. One such scholar, Jacob Appel of New York University, has described humanist views toward dying as follows:

How a person decides to die is among the most personal choices any human being will ever make. Some terminally ill patients will wish for the healthcare system to expend every available dollar on prolonging their lives, all the way to the point of imminent medical futility. Others will forgo heroic and extreme measures, preferring to let nature take its course. A third group of individuals—and I am among these—would like to survive only until we can no longer communicate meaningfully and lucidly with our loved ones; then, we want our healthcare providers to terminate our lives with as much speed and as little pain as possible. In an enlightened society, each of these wishes would be honored.

== Personification of death ==
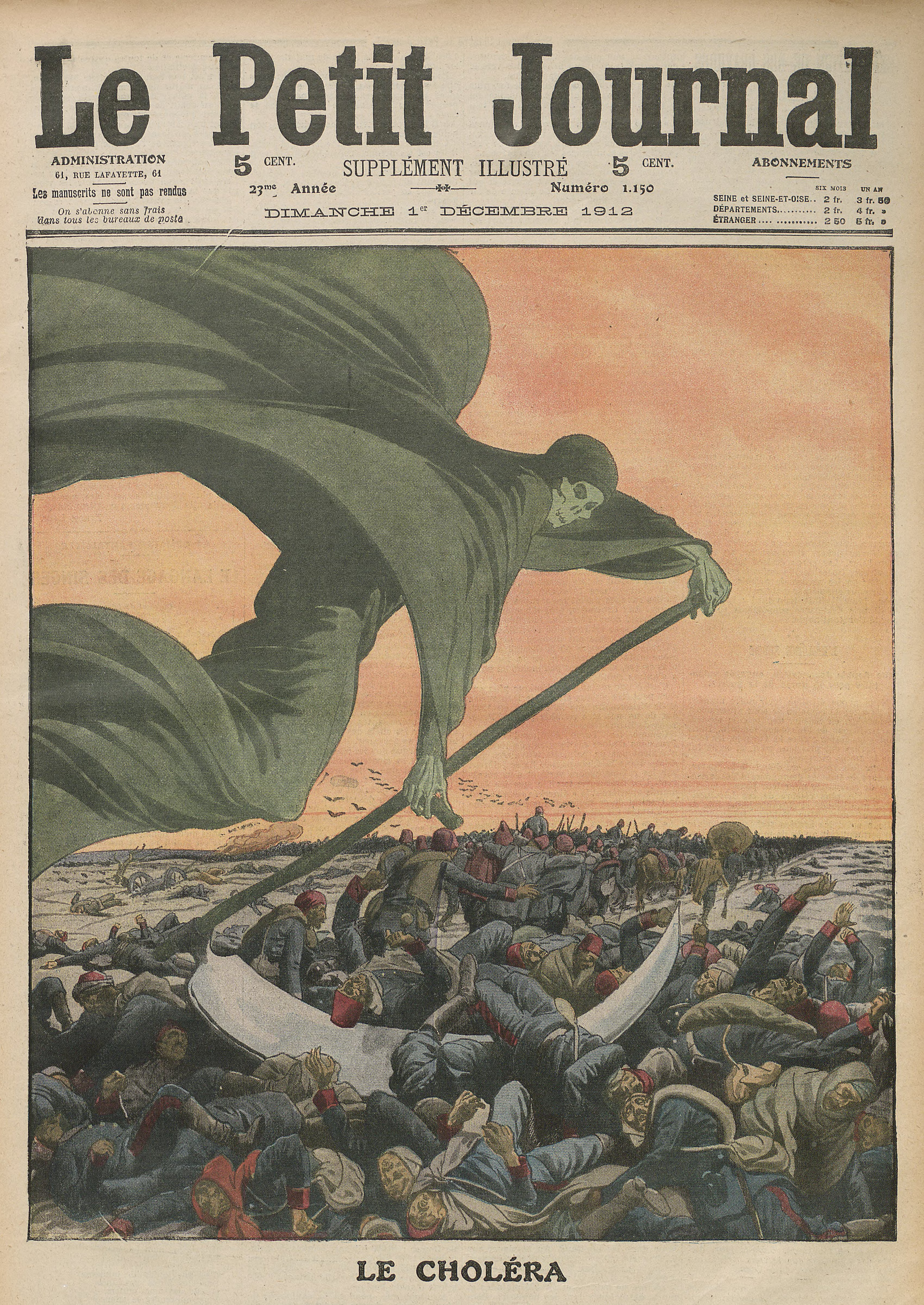
Drawing of Death bringing cholera, in Le Petit Journal, 1912

Death has been personified as a figure or fictional character in mythology and popular culture since the earliest days of storytelling. Because the reality of death has had a substantial influence on the human psyche and the development of civilization as a whole, the personification of Death as a living, sentient entity is a concept that has existed in many societies since before the beginning of recorded history. In western culture, death has long been shown as a skeletal figure carrying a large scythe, and sometimes wearing a midnight black gown with a hood. This image was widely illustrated during the Middle Ages.

Examples of death personified are:

- Mexican tradition holds the goddess or folk saint called Santa Muerte as the personification of death.
- In modern-day European-based folklore, Death is known as the "Grim Reaper" or "The grim spectre of death". This form typically wields a scythe, and is sometimes portrayed riding a white horse.
- In the Middle Ages, Death was imagined as a decaying or mummified human corpse, later becoming the familiar skeleton in a robe.
- Death is sometimes portrayed in fiction and occultism as Azrael, the angel of death (note that the name "Azrael" does not appear in any versions of either the Bible or in the Qur'an).
- Father Time is sometimes said to be Death.
- A psychopomp is a spirit, deity, or other being whose task is to conduct the souls of the recently dead into the afterlife, as in Greek, Roman and other cultures.

== Numerical symbolism in East Asia ==
In mainland China and Taiwan, Japan, and Korea, the number 4 is often associated with death because the sound of the Chinese, Japanese, and Korean words for four and death are similar (for example, the sound sì in Chinese is the Sino-Korean number 4 (四), whereas sǐ is the word for death (死), and in Japanese "shi" is the number 4, whereas shinu is to die). For this reason, hospitals, airports and hotels often omit the 4th, 14th, 24th, floors (etc.), or substitute the number '4' with the letter 'F'. Koreans are buried under a mound standing vertical in coffins made from six planks of wood. Four of the planks represent the respective four cardinal points of the compass, while a fifth represents sky and the sixth represents earth. This relates back to the importance that Confucian society placed upon the four cardinal points having mystical powers.

== Glorification of and fascination with death ==
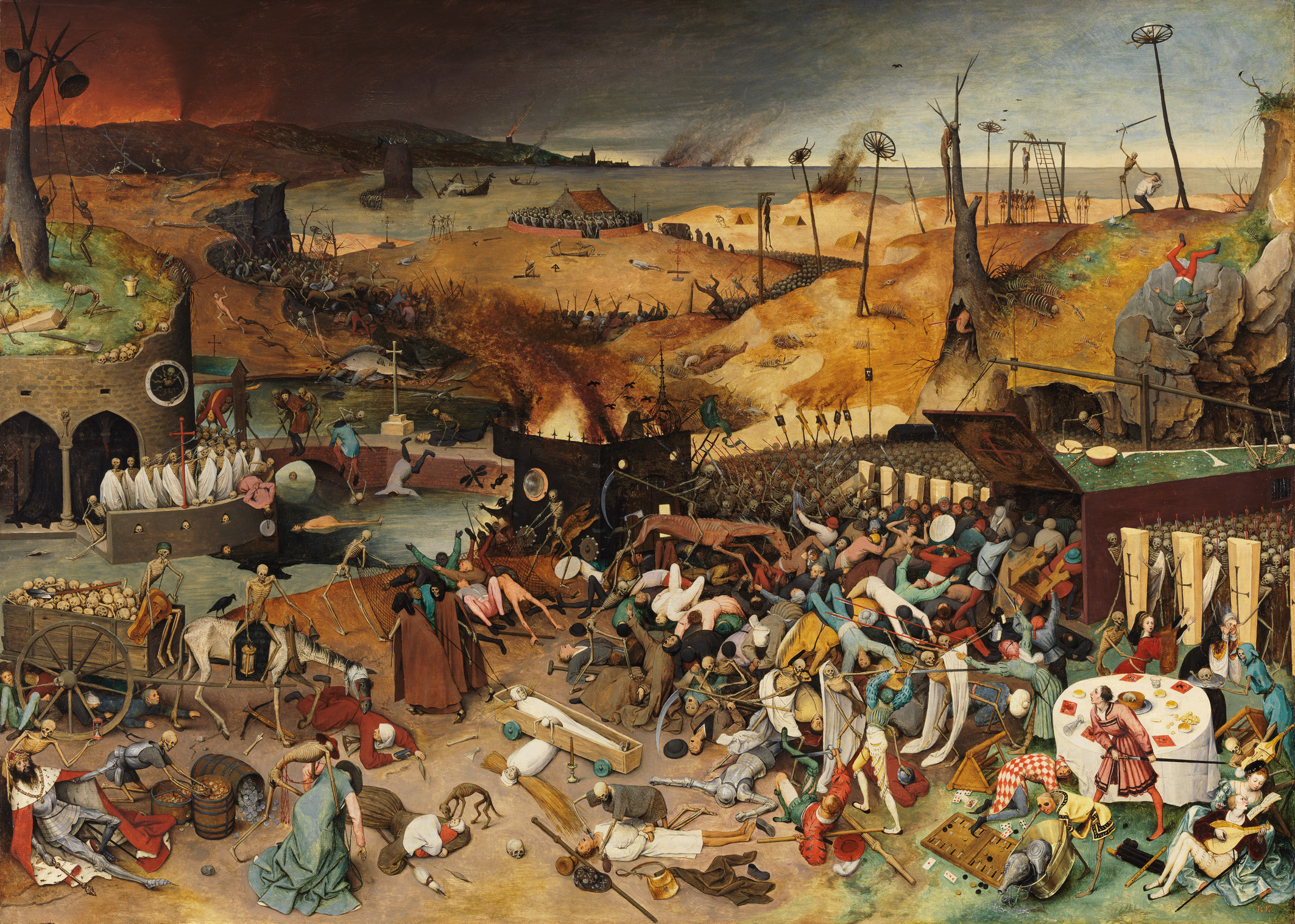
The Triumph of Death by Pieter Brueghel the Elder

Whether because of its poetic nature, the great mystery it presents, or both, many cultures glorify death as well as crime, martyrdom, revenge, suicide, war, and many other forms of violence involving death. Each of these categories represents larger meanings than simply the cessation of life, and it is usually these meanings which may be glorified.

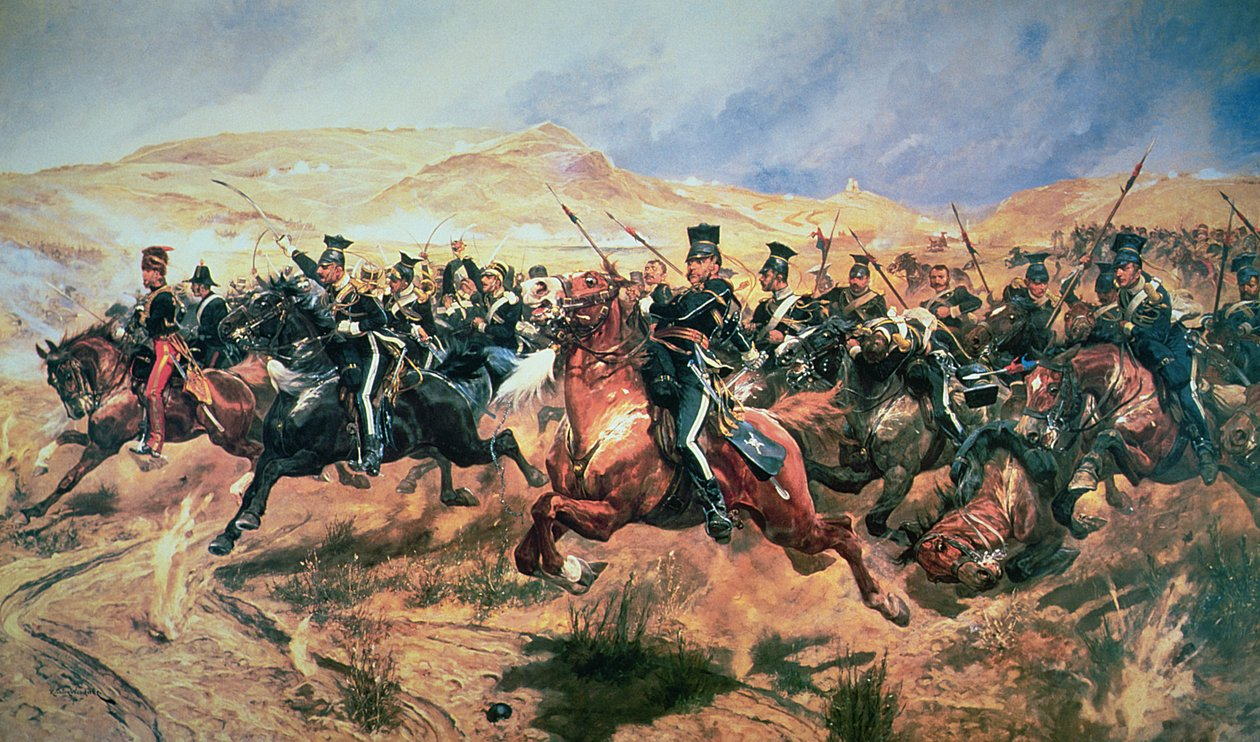
1894 painting of the Charge of the Light Brigade

In modern times, death and these related constructs have been glorified despite attempts to depict them without glory. For example, film critic Roger Ebert mentions in a number of articles that French director François Truffaut says he believes it is impossible to make an anti-war film, as any depiction of war ends up glorifying it.

The most prevalent and permanent form of death's glorification is through artistic expression. For example, songs such as "Knockin' on Heaven's Door" and "Bullet in the Head" show death as poetic or employ poetic analogy. Military engagements such as the Charge of the Light Brigade and the Battle of the Alamo have served as inspirations for artistic depictions of and myths regarding death. In 2010, a non-profit arts organization in East Haddam, Connecticut invited artists to participate in an interdisciplinary project titled "Thanatopolis at I-Park", which I-Park described as, "an alternative, artist-imaged memorial park/space seeking to fill the gap left by empty and irrelevant contemporary memorial practice."

The perception of glory in death is subjective and can differ wildly from one member of a group to another. Religion can play a key role, especially in terms of expectations of an afterlife. Personal feelings and perceptions about mode of death are also important factors.

== See also ==
- Culture of life
- Death, Desire and Loss in Western Culture
- Death in Russian traditions
- Mortality salience
- Tukdam
