= Alan Sinfield =

- Born: 17 December 1941; Southgate, London, England
- Died: 2 December 2017 (aged 75)
- Education: University College London
- Occupation: University professor
- Employer: University of Sussex
- Partner(s): Jonathan Dollimore; Vincent Quinn

Alan Sinfield (17 December 1941 – 2 December 2017) was an English theorist in the fields of Shakespeare and sexuality, modern theatre, gender studies, queer theory, queer studies, post-1945 politics and cultural theory. He was a professor of English at the University of Sussex, and the author of a dozen books, and is credited with a leading role in establishing queer studies in mainstream academic studies.

== Early life ==
Alan Sinfield was born in Southgate, north London, on 17 December 1941 to Lucy (née Seabright) and Ernest Sinfield; they had one more son, Mark. Ernest Sinfield died serving in the Royal Air Force in 1944, and Lucy began experiencing Parkinson's disease soon after, though she continued working, washing dishes in a cafe in difficult conditions. Growing up in a poor household "made Alan acutely aware of the limitations of the postwar promise to provide equal access to the nation’s resources", and he credited his mother's experience with shaping his political commitment to, in his own words, "disadvantaged people—those who are elderly, infirm, unemployed, black, queer, lone parents, and so on".

== Education ==
Sinfield attended the Royal Wolverhampton School on a scholarship for children who had lost parents in the War. He learned the guitar and had a skiffle band, which also included his brother. This was followed by University College London, from which he took a first-class BA in 1964, an MA in 1967 (which was the basis for his 1971 The Language of Tennyson's In Memoriam), and a DLitt in 1987.

== Career ==
Sinfield was appointed as a lecturer in English at the University of Sussex in 1965, eventually becoming Professor of English and Cultural Studies in 1990. According to The Guardian, from the late 1970s, "Sussex now developed its reputation as the most exciting, theoretically informed English department in the country, pioneering wider changes in the way English is taught in universities, with Alan a key figure."

Sinfield's Literature, Politics and Culture in Postwar Britain, first published in 1989, is a revolutionary socialist interpretation of the postwar cultural settlement and its destruction. He pioneered the Sexual Dissidence programme at the University of Sussex with Jonathan Dollimore and taught postgraduate students and research in the field of sexual dissidence at the University of Sussex.

Sinfield retired from Sussex in 2004.

In 2016, Sinfield and his work were the subject of a special issue of the journal Textual Practice, entitled On Alan Sinfield. Sinfield was himself the editor of the journal for a long period.

== Personal life and death ==
Sinfield became the partner of Jonathan Dollimore in the 1970s, and Sinfield purchased a cottage in Shropshire in this period. Sinfield's partner from the mid-1990s was Vincent Quinn. Sinfield suffered from Parkinson's disease, and Quinn became his full-time caregiver after the illness began to affect Sinfield's speech.

Sinfield died on 2 December 2017.

== Bibliography ==
- Shakespeare, Authority, Sexuality: Unfinished Business in Cultural Materialism (2006)
- Literature, Politics and Culture in Postwar Britain (2004)
- On Sexuality and Power (2004)
- Out on Stage: Lesbian and Gay Theatre in the Twentieth Century (1999)
- Gay and After: Gender, Culture and Consumption (1998)
- Cultural Politics – Queer Reading (1994)
- The Wilde Century: Effeminacy, Oscar Wilde and the Queer Moment (1994)
- Political Shakespeare: Essays in Cultural Materialism (1994) (With Jonathan Dollimore)
- Faultlines: Cultural Materialism and the Politics of Dissident Reading (1992)
- Literature in Protestant England, 1560–1660 (1983)
- Dramatic Monologue (1977)
- The Language of Tennyson's In Memoriam (1971)

== See also ==
- Cultural materialism
