= History of religious pluralism =

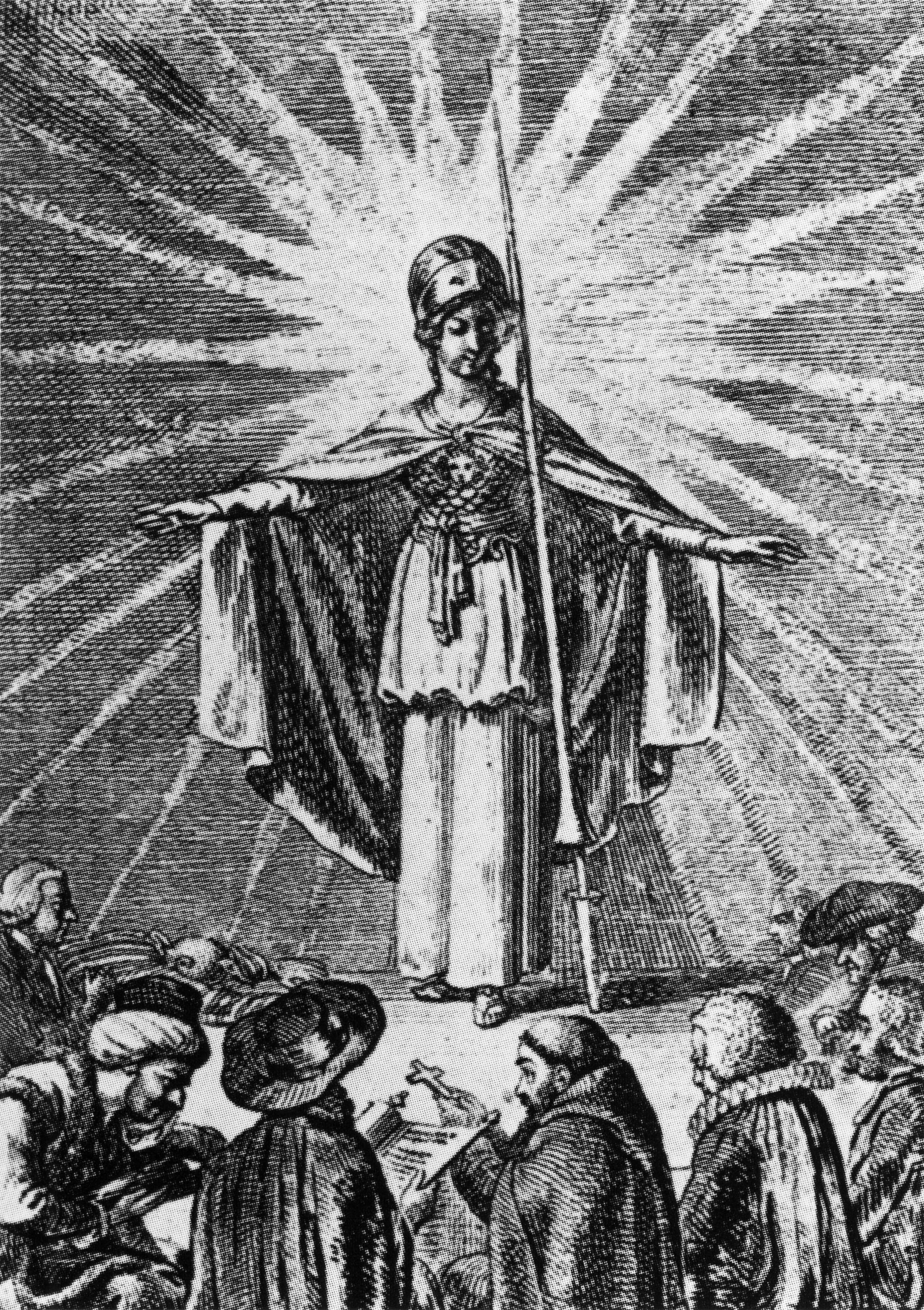
Minerva as a symbol of enlightened wisdom protects the believers of all religions (Daniel Chodowiecki, 1791)

The history of religious pluralism is the fruit of a long development that reaches from antiquity to contemporary trends in postmodernity.

== Asia ==
=== India ===
India has been a place of fertile religious endeavour since the latter part of the Vedic period. Jainism and Buddhism, which were part of the sramana movement have been from their inception religions motivated by compassion for all creatures as well as believers in the inherent rationality and reasonableness of true religion. They have thus sought and advocated rational debate concerning matters of truth. India is, in fact, as far as we can tell the home of the first written statement of religious pluralism, tolerance and interfaith dialogue. The Rock Edict XII by the Emperor Ashoka states the following:

The beloved of the gods, King Piyadasi (Ashoka), honors both ascetics and the householders of all religions, and he honors them with gifts and honors of various kinds. But the beloved of the gods, King Piyadasi, does not value gifts and honors as much as he values this - that there should be growth in the essentials of all religions. Growth in essentials can be done in different ways, but all of them have as their root restraint in speech, that is, not praising one's own religion, or condemning the religion of others without good cause. And if there is cause for criticism, it should be done in a mild way. But it is better to honor other religions for this reason. By so doing, one's own religion benefits, and so do other religions, while doing otherwise harms one's own religion and the religions of others. Whoever praises his own religion, due to excessive devotion, and condemns others with the thought "Let me glorify my own religion," only harms his own religion. Therefore contact between religions is good. One should listen to and respect the doctrines professed by others. The beloved of the gods, king Piyadasi, desires that all should be well-learned in the good doctrines of other religions. Those who are content with their own religion should be told this: the beloved of the gods, King Piyadasi, does not value gifts and honors as much as he values that there should be growth in the essentials of all religions. And to this end many are working - dhamma Mahamatras, Mahamatras in charge of the women's quarters, officers in charge of outlying areas, and other such officers. And the fruit of this is that one's own religion grows and the dhamma is illuminated also.

Religious tolerance was promoted to varying degrees during the course of several Muslim settlements (Delhi Sultanate 1276-1526 AD and the Mughal Empire 1526–1857 AD). In the 8th century, Zoroastrianism was established in India as Zoroastrians fled from Persia to India in large numbers, where they were given refuge. The colonial phase ushered in by the British lasted until 1947 and furthered conversions to Christianity among low caste Hindus. In 1948 as many as 20,000 Jews Bene Jews and Cochin Jews lived in India, though most of them have since emigrated to Israel.

Although in Japan Buddhism and Shinto have more or less co-existed for centuries, the arrival of Christianity through Francis Xavier led to widespread persecution of Christians and the eventual exclusion of Christianity for hundreds of years until the Meiji era, as the rulers of Japan saw it as a threat. Christians and Buddhists were also persecuted under State Shinto.

=== Mongol Empire ===
Mongols were highly tolerant of most religions during the early Mongol Empire, and typically sponsored several at the same time. To avoid strife, Genghis Khan set up an institution that ensured complete religious freedom, though he himself was a shamanist. Under his administration, all religious leaders were exempt from taxation, and from public service. Mongol emperors were known for organizing competitions of religious debates among clerics, and these would draw large audiences.

== Islamic world ==
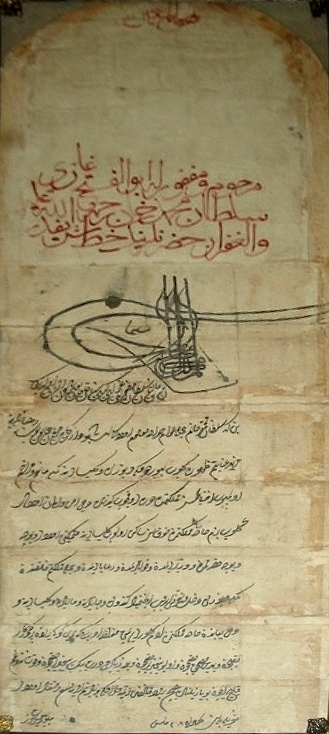
Mehmed II's ahidnâme to the Catholic monks of the recently conquered Bosnia issued in 1463, granting them full religious freedom and protection.

Religious pluralism existed in medieval Islamic law and Islamic ethics, as the religious laws and courts of other religions, including Christianity, Judaism and Hinduism, were usually accommodated within the Islamic legal framework, as exemplified in the Caliphate, Al-Andalus, Ottoman Empire and Indian subcontinent.

In medieval Islamic societies, the qadi (Islamic judges) usually could not interfere in the matters of non-Muslims unless the parties voluntarily choose to be judged according to Islamic law, thus the dhimmi communities living in Islamic states usually had their own laws independent from the Sharia law, such as the Jews who would have their own Halakha courts. Islamic empires allowed non-believers to have their own laws and courts in exchange for a Jizya poll tax.

Dhimmis were allowed to operate their own courts following their own legal systems in cases that did not involve other religious groups, or capital offences or threats to public order. Non-Muslims were allowed to engage in religious practices that was usually forbidden by Islamic law, such as the consumption of alcohol and pork, as well as religious practices which Muslims found repugnant, such as the Zoroastrian practice of incestuous "self-marriage" where a man could marry his mother, sister or daughter. According to the famous Islamic legal scholar Ibn Qayyim (1292-1350), non-Muslims had the right to engage in such religious practices even if it offended Muslims, under the conditions that such cases not be presented to Islamic Sharia courts and that these religious minorities believed that the practice in question is permissible according to their religion.

== Europe ==
=== Antiquity ===
The polytheistic Roman Empire saw the traditional Roman religion as one fundamentals of the Roman republic. They saw Roman virtues as an important link in their multi-ethnic empire. Being polytheistic, Romans did not mind if conquered nations went on worshiping their traditional gods, as long as they also presented token offerings to the Roman gods. In many cases this compromise was easily reached by identifying the traditional gods with similar Roman gods. Failure to offer up this token worship was seen as disloyal to Rome, and an act of political rebellion against the Emperor.

There was, though, a problem with people whose religion excluded the veneration of other gods - especially the Jews and the Christians. The Romans tended to view this as rebellion, and so it resulted in many conflicts arising from often unintended offenses, like putting a statue of an emperor in a prominent place in Jerusalem which resulted in a public revolt. Similarly difficult to understand for the Roman mindset was the attitude of Christians who rather chose torture or death instead of offering incense to the Roman emperor. From the Roman view, the refusal to venerate the Roman emperor was political treason.

The edict of Milan which decreed tolerance of Christianity was followed by a time of parallel existence of Christianity and paganism which was, though, far from an actual religious pluralism - the religion of the emperor was always at an advantage, and the Arian, trinitarian and pagan emperors in the fourth century saw it as perfectly legitimate to take measures against religious leaders who did not share their belief. By the fifth century, the western Roman Empire had crumbled, but the same patterns of behavior continued in the eastern Roman Empire along with the Gaulish, Celtic, and Germanic kingdoms that replaced the west.

=== Middle Ages ===
After the breakdown of the Roman Empire in the west, in western Europe the population was a huge, diverse mix of Latin peoples, Germanic peoples who had been absorbed into the Empire and its Legions over the course of hundreds of years, and newly arriving Germanic tribes that were migrating into western Europe. In each of these vaguely defined categories were some Christians, some pagans, and some who subscribed to some elements of both. In the German tradition, the chief of the tribe was also religious leader, so conversion of the leaders (even if for political reasons) was followed in many cases by Christianization of the tribe - with the chief of the tribe being now the de facto head of the Christian church. There were very frequent instances of parallel pagan and Christian religion, but tolerance of old or new religion was up to the personal preference of the local lord.

The tradition of the head of the tribe as head of the church was continued by the Kings which these chieftains eventually evolved into, with the king and/or emperor holding by virtue of office the right of investiture of bishops and also of deciding in religious matters - Charlemagne, e.g., took the Pope to task for not using the filioque in the Nicene Creed. The religion of the ruler was the official religion of the people and, again, any tolerance of foreigners or remnants of pagans was up to the present ruler. The unity of religion was generally seen as a prerequisite for any worldly state - a divergent religion was in the consequence not regarded just as a religious problem but also an action against state and ruler punishable by criminal law.

In the high Middle Ages, the worldly powers clashed with the power of the pope on the matter of deciding about religious questions - while the details varied by country, the overall result was that the Roman Catholic Church was able to, for a short time, exercise control over the religious practices of countries, even against that Ruler's will.

=== Protestant Reformation ===
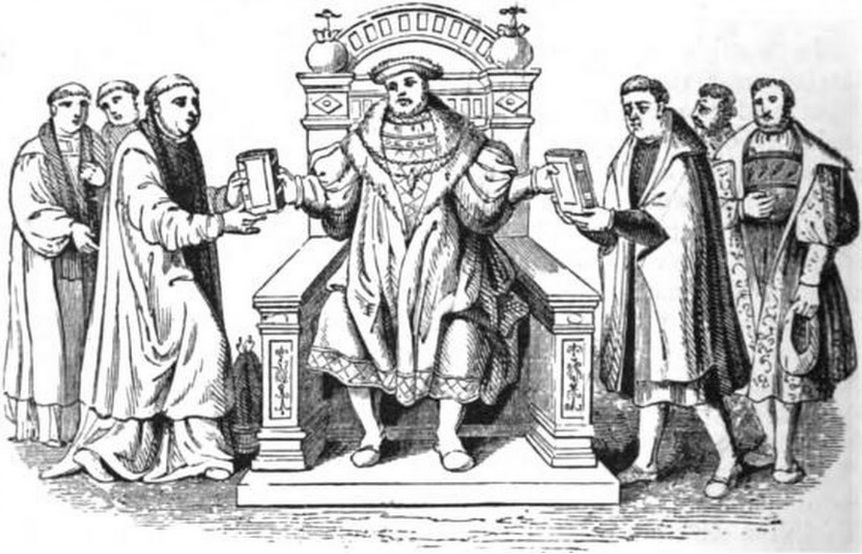
Confutatio Augustana (Catholic, on left) and Confessio Augustana (Lutheran, on right) being presented at the Diet of Augsburg. This picture is somewhat ahistorical because a written copy of the Confutatio was never provided by the Catholics; rather they had to go off of stenographers they had brought with them just in case the Catholics wouldn't give them a copy.

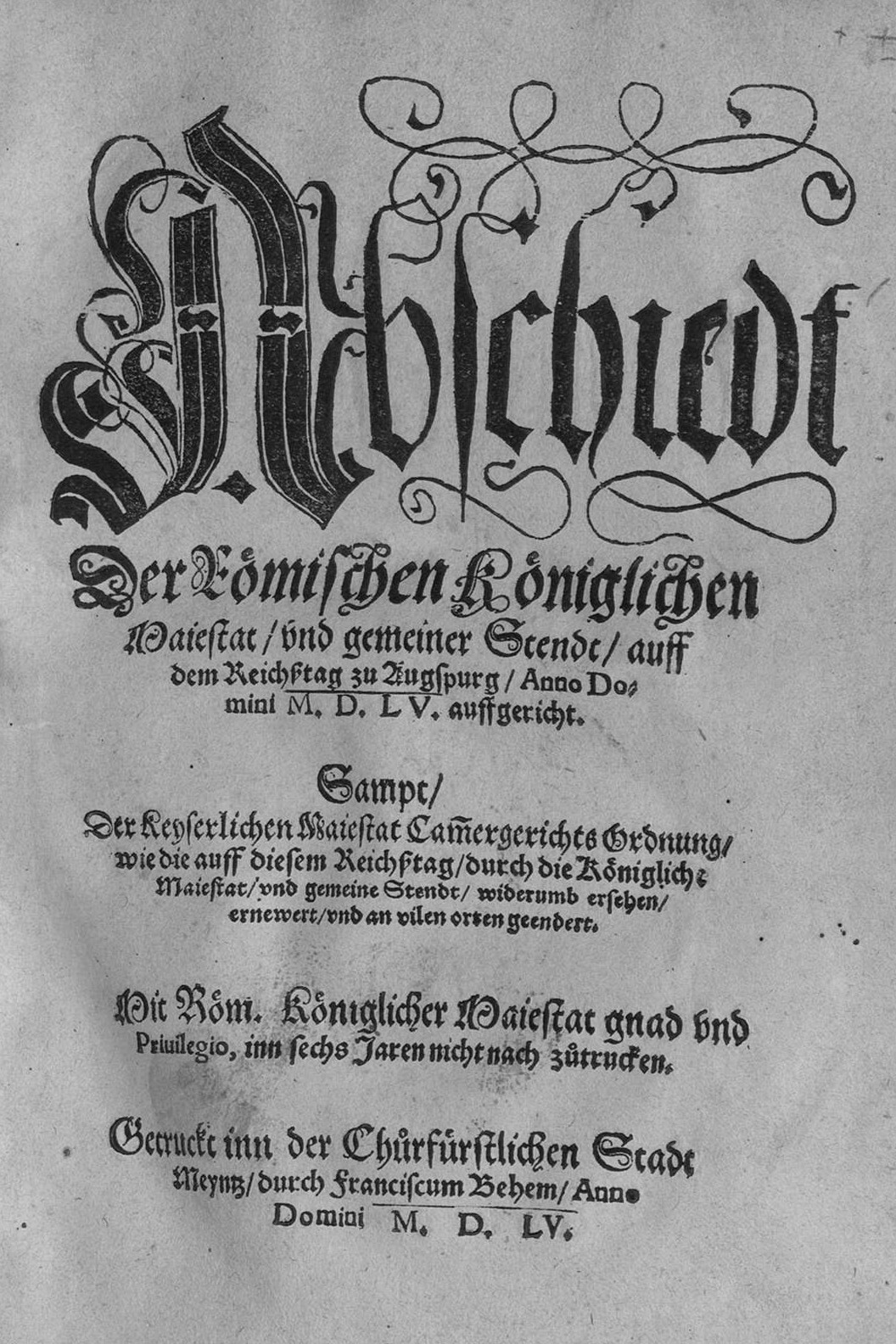
Front page of the 1555 Peace of Augsburg, which recognized two different churches in the Holy Roman Empire.

The Reformation resulted in a weakening of the power of the papacy, which was unable to control the spread of information such as Luther's Ninety-five Theses. Although Jan Huss was burned at the stake in 1415, Luther's enemies were unable to do the same to him a century later due to protection from the local ruler of Saxony. The split between the Lutherans and the Catholics was made public and clear with the 1521 Edict of Worms: the edicts of the Diet condemned Luther and officially banned citizens of the Holy Roman Empire from defending or propagating his ideas. Acceptance of the Lutherans was first granted in the 1530 Augsburg Confession and later the 1555 Peace of Augsburg. Although other Christian churches were not accepted, some of them found legal recognition when Phillip Melancthon agreed to publish an altered version of the Augsburg Confession.

Luther brokered the 1525 treaty between Albert, Duke of Prussia and Sigismund I the Old that facilitated the expulsion of the Teutonic knights and the secularization of the Duchy of Prussia. The new state was officially Lutheran but in practice pluralistic. Following the legal principle of cuius regio, eius religio, states within the Holy Roman Empire following the 1555 Peace of Augsburg were officially the religion of the ruler. As a result, emigration was sometimes necessary to avoid enforcement. Various religious refugees, such as the Huguenots, some Anglicans, Quakers, Anabaptists or even Jesuits or Capuchins were able to find refuge at Istanbul and in the Ottoman Empire, where they were given right of residence and worship. Further, the Ottomans supported the Calvinists in Transylvania and Hungary but also in France. The contemporary French thinker Jean Bodin wrote:

The great emperor of the Turks does with as great devotion as any prince in the world honour and observe the religion by him received from his ancestors, and yet detests he not the strange religions of others; but on the contrary permits every man to live according to his conscience: yes, and that more is, near unto his palace at Pera, suffers four diverse religions viz. that of the Jews, that of the Christians, that of the Grecians, and that of the Mahometans.

— Jean Bodin.

In Transylvania it was declared in 1568 at Turda the religious tolerance for every religion and it was realised the religious pluralism. The role of authority was to supervise the peaceful religious cohabitation between Catholics, Calvinist, Lutheran, antitrinitarians, orthodox, sabbatharians, Jews and Muslims. The Transylvanian situation remained for long time an isolated fearful model of "diabolic liberty" (Beze, Basel,1569)but was well known and appreciated between religious persecuted antitrinitarians in Holland and in England.

The Thirty Years' War began when the Protestant Frederick V, Elector Palatine accepted the throne of Bohemia from the Bohemian estates. This initiated the Thirty Years' War, one of the most destructive conflicts in human history. It was both a religious war (with Protestants hoping to preserve the freedoms of the Letter of Majesty) and a political war. Ottoman Turks and French Catholics fought on the "Protestant" side against the Habsburgs. The 1648 Peace of Westphalia brought an end to the European wars of religion and allowed the Protestant rulers to continue being Protestant. Theologically, the following syncretistic controversy prodded Protestants to understand and appreciate the Roman Catholic side more.

Restrictions on smaller Protestant sects who disagreed with the national churches in these countries prompted such groups as the Pilgrim Fathers to seek freedom in North America, although when these became the majority they sometimes sought to deny this freedom to Jews and Roman Catholics.

=== Enlightenment ===
In the second half of the seventeenth century, partially out of being tired with the religious wars, partially influenced by early enlightenment, several countries adopted some sort of tolerance for other denominations, e.g. the Peace of Westphalia 1653 or the Edict of Tolerance in England in 1689.

Protestant and freethinking philosophers like John Locke and Thomas Paine, who argued for tolerance and moderation in religion, were strongly influential on the Founding Fathers, and the modern religious freedom and equality underlying religious pluralism in the United States are guaranteed by First Amendment to the United States Constitution, which states:

"Congress shall make no law respecting an establishment of religion, or prohibiting the free exercise thereof..."

In the United States religious pluralism can be said to be overseen by the secular state, which guarantees equality under law between different religions, whether these religion have a handful of adherents or many millions. The state also guarantees the freedom of those who choose not to belong to any religion.

While the United States had to begin with no dominant religion or denomination, this was very different in European countries who have, except for some Balkan states, a history with one dominant Christian denomination whose influence on their culture is felt until present times. Enlightenment in Europe did not so much promote the rights of minority religions but the rights of individuals to express beliefs diverging from the mainstream religion of the country, while belonging to that religion or being outside of it. While European countries generally went the way of gradually increasing the rights for minority denominations and religions, up to today the stress has been more on the freedom of belief of the individual, whereas the rights of religious organizations are often limited by the state to prevent them intruding upon the individual religious freedom.
