= Ewan Fernie =

British scholar and writer

- Ewan Fernie at The University of Birmingham in 2023
- Occupations: Chair, Professor, and Fellow at The Shakespeare Institute

Academic background
- Education: University of Edinburgh University of St Andrews

Academic work
- Discipline: Literary Critic, Political Thinker, Writer
- Sub-discipline: Shakespeare studies, 19th century political philosophy
- Institutions: The Shakespeare Institute, Stratford-upon-Avon

Ewan Fernie is Chair, Professor, and Fellow at the Shakespeare Institute, Stratford-upon-Avon.

Fernie is a literary critic, cultural commentator, political thinker and creative writer interested in the nexus between art, politics, philosophy and religion. Topics he has written about include shame, spirituality, working-class freedom movements, and the culture wars. His range of reference encompasses Luther, Dostoevsky, Nietzsche, Kierkegaard and Hegel, as well as the connections between Shakespeare and revolution at the dawn of the modern epoch.

Fernie was the Director of the 2-million-pound Lottery-funded ‘Everything to Everybody’ Project, which revived the first great Shakespeare library in the world with people and communities across Birmingham and fed into the Opening Ceremony of the 2022 Commonwealth Games.

Having lectured and featured in print and broadcast media across the globe, Fernie was academic anchor for the BBC series Shakespeare: Rise of a Genius in 2023. He was also the main expert contributor to Channel 4's Shakespeare, My Family and Me with Judi Dench, which aired on 27 December 2025 and New Year's Day, 2026.

He has recently begun to write for the Dublin Review of Books.

== Background and career ==
Fernie won the James Elliott prize for his 1994 first-class degree from the University of Edinburgh, where he was also awarded a medal in aesthetics, the Horsliehill-Scott Bursary in Philosophy and a number of other prizes. In 2005, he was named one of the world's six best Renaissance scholars under 40.

He took his PhD from the University of St Andrews and afterwards lectured at the Queen's University of Belfast and Royal Holloway before joining the Shakespeare Institute in 2011. Shortly after taking up his Chair at the Shakespeare Institute, Fernie pioneered the Shakespeare and Creativity MA programme. He also established the Institute’s long-running collaboration with the Royal Shakespeare Company, co-hosting a notable conference at The Other Place with Erica Whyman under the title ‘Radical Mischief: Inviting Experiment in Theatre, Thought and Politics’.

Fernie’s Redcrosse project promoted a new civic liturgy for St George's Day, for people of all faiths and none, which was premiered at Windsor Castle and Manchester Cathedral.

His ‘Everything to Everybody’ Project, whose patron was Adrian Lester, reached more than 275,000 people in a city-wide revival of Birmingham’s democratic Shakespeare heritage. It culminated in taking the only First Folio in the world that was bought as part of a vision of comprehensive - including working-class - education into the Bullring Shopping Centre.

Fernie has held visiting positions at Eton College, the Centre for Advanced Study at LMU Munich, Malmö University, the Australian Catholic University, and the University of Queensland.

In 2027, he returns to LMU Munich as Senior Research Fellow in the Cross-Cultural Philology Excellence Cluster.

== Work ==
Fernie's critical work is fundamentally characterised by a passionate belief that art and literature can reveal, connect with and even shape personal, political and religious life. His books include: Shame in Shakespeare; The Demonic: Literature and Experience; Shakespeare for Freedom; ‘Macbeth, Macbeth’ (a novel cowritten with the Oxford scholar Simon Palfrey, which the philosopher, Slavoj Žižek called ‘a miracle, an instant classic’); Spiritual Shakespeares; Redcrosse: Remaking Religious Poetry for Today’s World; Thomas Mann and Shakespeare: Something Rich and Strange; and New Places: Shakespeare and Civic Creativity. For many years, he co-edited the ground-breaking ‘Shakespeare Now!’ series for Bloomsbury.

== Publications ==
- 'Bardolatry', in The Routledge Handbook to Shakespeare and Religion, ed. W. Stockton,1st edn, Routledge Literature Companions, Routledge, (2025), pp. 33-44, ISBN 978-1-040-75903-5
- (as co-author with KA Craik) 'Performing Chastity: The Marina Project' in Shakespeare and Virtue: A Handbook. ed. in JR Lupton & D Sherman Cambridge University Press, (2023), pp. 360-368, ISBN 978-1-108-91043-9
- 'Deconstructing Social Hierarchies', Interviews. E Coulehan with Ewan Fernie in The Arden Research Handbook of Shakespeare and Social Justice. ed. D Ruiter, 1 edn, Bloomsbury Academic, (2022), pp. 59-62, ISBN 978-1-350-14037-0
- 'Shakespearean City', in Shakespeare-Jahrbuch 2022: Politik, ed. S Schülting & I Karremann, vol. 158, Shakespeare Jahrbuch, (2022), pp. 114-135.
- 'George Dawson', in George Dawson & his Circle: The Civic Gospel in Victorian Birmingham, ed. S Roberts & A Reekes, Merlin Press, (2021), pp. 19-25, ISBN 978-0-85036-771-3
- (as co-author with K. Scheil) ''O Brave New World?' Shakespeare and George Dawson in America', in History West Midlands. October 2020
- 'Shakespeare and Incomplete Modernity', in The Challenge of Change, Narr Francke Attempto Verlag, (2019), pp. 19-43.
- 'Modernity Unbound: Birmingham, Shakespeare, and the French Revolutions', in Sillages Critiques, (2019), vol. 37, pp. 1.
- 'Lost Prophet', in History West Midlands, (2018), pp. 1-12.
- (as co-editor with Tom Epps) Forgotten Treasures: The World’s First Great Shakespeare Library, West Midlands History Ltd (2022), ISBN 978-1905036851
- (as co-editor with Paul Edmondson) New Places: Shakespeare and Civic Creativity, The Arden Shakespeare, (2018), ISBN 978-1474244558
- Shakespeare for Freedom: Why the Plays Matter, Cambridge University Press, (2017), ISBN 978-1107130852
- ‘Introduction’, The Poet's Quest for God: 21st Century Poems of Faith, Doubt and Wonder, ed. Todd Swift et al., Eyewear Publishing, (2016), ISBN 978-1908998255
- (as co-author with Simon Palfrey) Macbeth, Macbeth, Bloomsbury, (2016), ISBN 978-1474235556
- (as co-editor with Tobias Döring) Thomas Mann and Shakespeare: Something Rich and Strange, Bloomsbury, (2015), ISBN 978-1628922097
- ‘Freetown! Shakespeare and Social Flourishing’, Shakespeare Survey 68 (2015), ISBN 9781107108844
- ‘Love's Transgression’, in The Circulation of Knowledge in Early Modern English Literature, ed. Sophie Chiari, Ashgate, (2015), ISBN 9781472449153
- ‘Another Golgotha’, in Shakespeare and Varieties of Early Modern Religious Belief, ed. David Loewenstein and Michael Witmore, CUP, (2014), ISBN 978-1107026612
- ‘Afterword’, Revisiting The Tempest, ed. Silvia Bigliazzi and Lisanna Calvi, Palgrave, (2014), ISBN 9781137333131
- ‘Redcrosse: Storytelling, Religion and Nation in England’, in Storytelling: Critical and Creative Approaches, ed. L. E. Semler, Philippa Kelly, and Jan Shaw, Palgrave, (2014), ISBN 978-1137349941
- The Demonic: Literature and Experience, Routledge, (2012), ISBN 978-0415690256
- Shame in Shakespeare, Routledge, (2002), ISBN 978-0415258289
- ‘Wisdom in Reverse’, in The Oxford Handbook of Thomas Middleton, ed. Gary Taylor and Trish Thomas Henley, Oxford University Press, (2011), ISBN 978-0199559886
- (with Simon Palfrey) 'Major Excerpt from Dunsinane', in Crrritic, ed. John Schad and Oliver Tearle, Sussex Academic Press, (2011), ISBN 978-1845193829
- 'Mea Culpa: Measure for Measure and Complicity’, in Shakespeare and I, ed. Will McKenzie and Theodora Papadopoulou, Continuum, (2011), ISBN 978-1441137180
- ‘Dollimore's Challenge’, Shakespeare Studies (2007), ISBN 9780838641231
- ‘Hard-core Tragedy’, in Transhistorical Tragedy, ed. Sarah Annes Brown and Catherine Silverstone, Blackwell, (2007), ISBN 1405135468
- ‘Action! Henry V', in Presentist Shakespeares, ed. Hugh Grady and Terence Hawkes, Routledge, (2007), ISBN 978-0415385299
- 'Terrible Action: Recent Criticism and Questions of Agency’, Shakespeare 2 (2006), ISSN 1745-0918 (Print), ISSN 1745-0926 (Online)
- Shakespeare and the Prospect of Presentism’, Shakespeare Survey 58 (2005), ISBN 9780521850742
- (as Editor and Co-Author) Redcrosse: Remaking Religious Poetry for Today's World, Bloomsbury, (2012), ISBN 978-1441138996
- (as Editor) Spiritual Shakespeares, Routledge, (2005), ISBN 978-0415319676
- (as Co-ordinating Editor) Reconceiving the Renaissance: A Critical Reader, Oxford University Press, (2006), ISBN 978-0199265572

(as General Editor, with Simon Palfrey) The Shakespeare Now! series (Arden, Bloomsbury):

- Shakespeare's Universality: Here's Fine Revolution, by Kiernan Ryan (2015)
- Tragic Cognition in Shakespeare's Othello: Beyond the Neural Sublime, by Paul Ceflau (2015)
- The King and I, by Philippa Kelly (2015)
- Nine Lives of William Shakespeare, by Graham Holderness (2013)
- Hamlet's Dreams, by David Schalkwyk (2013)
- Shakespeare and I, by William McKenzie and Theodora Papadopoulou (ed.) (2012)
- The Life in the Sonnets, by David Fuller (2011)
- At the Bottom of Shakespeare's Ocean, by Steve Mentz (2009)
- Shakespearean Metaphysics, by Michael Witmore (2008)
- Shakespeare's Modern Collaborators, by Lukas Erne (2008)
- Shakespeare's Double Helix, by Henry S. Turner (2008)
- Shakespeare Thinking, by Philip Davis (2007)
- Shakespeare Inside: The Bard Behind Bars, by Amy Scott-Douglass (2007)
- Godless Shakespeare, by Eric Mallin (2007)
- To Be or Not to Be, by Douglas Bruster (2007)
