= Cultural materialism (cultural studies) =

Marxist theory of culture

Cultural materialism in literary theory and cultural studies traces its origin to the work of the left-wing literary critic Raymond Williams. Cultural materialism espouses analysis based on critical theory, in the tradition of the Frankfurt School. Key Words: A Journal of Cultural Materialism is dedicated to developing the field, and has been published by the Raymond Williams Society since 1998.

== Overview ==
Cultural materialism emerged as a theoretical movement in the early 1980s along with new historicism, an American approach to early modern literature, with which it shares common ground. The term was coined by Williams, who used it to describe a theoretical blending of leftist culturalism and Marxist analysis. Cultural materialists deal with specific historical documents and attempt to analyze and recreate the zeitgeist of a particular moment in history.

Williams viewed culture as a "productive process", part of the means of production, and cultural materialism often identifies what he called "residual", "emergent" and "oppositional" cultural elements. Following in the tradition of Herbert Marcuse, Antonio Gramsci and others, cultural materialists extend the class-based analysis of traditional Marxism (Neo-Marxism) by means of an additional focus on the marginalized.

Cultural materialists analyze the processes by which hegemonic forces in society appropriate canonical and historically important texts, such as Shakespeare and Austen, and utilize them in an attempt to validate or inscribe certain values on the cultural imaginary. Jonathan Dollimore and Alan Sinfield, authors of Political Shakespeare, have had considerable influence in the development of this movement and their book is considered to be a seminal text. They have identified four defining characteristics of cultural materialism as a theoretical device:

- Historical context
- Close textual analysis
- Political commitment
- Theoretical method

Cultural materialists seek to draw attention to the processes being employed by contemporary power structures, such as the church, the state or the academy, to disseminate ideology. To do this they explore a text’s historical context and its political implications, and then through close textual analysis note the dominant hegemonic position. They identify possibilities for the rejection and/or subversion of that position. British critic Graham Holderness defines cultural materialism as a "politicized form of historiography".

Through its insistence on the importance of an engagement with issues of gender, sexuality, race and class, cultural materialism has had a significant impact on the field of literary studies, especially in Britain. Cultural materialists have found the area of Renaissance studies particularly receptive to this type of analysis. Traditional humanist readings often eschewed consideration of the oppressed and marginalized in textual readings, whereas cultural materialists routinely consider such groups in their engagement with literary texts, thus opening new avenues of approach to issues of representation in the field of literary criticism.
