= AB InBev brands =

List of brands marketed by Anheuser-Busch InBev

Anheuser-Busch InBev SA/NV (abbreviated as AB InBev) is the largest beer company in the world. It had 200 brands prior to the merger with SABMiller on October 10, 2016. The combined AB InBev/SAB Miller entity has approximately 400 beer brands as of January 2017.

The original InBev global brands are Budweiser, Corona and Stella Artois. Its international brands are Beck's, Hoegaarden and Leffe. The rest are categorized as local brands. Many other brands were gained as a result of the merger with SABMiller.

The estimated annual sales for the company in 2017 will be US$55 billion; prior to the merger, AB InBev had realized US$43.6 billion in revenue in 2015. The company is expected to have an estimated global market share of 28 percent, according to Euromonitor International.

== Brands ==
=== Global ===
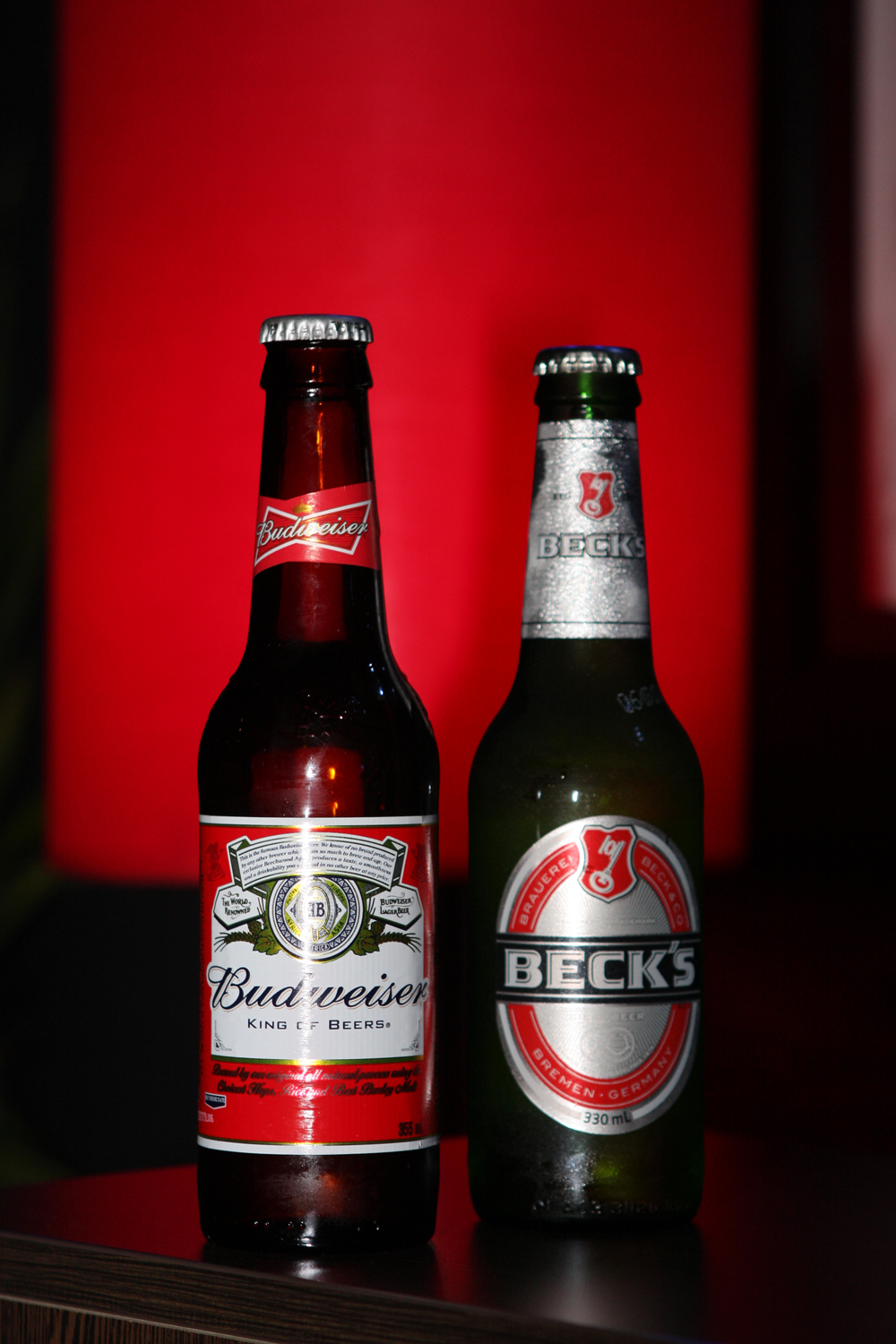
Budweiser & Beck’s beer bottles

- Beck's
  - Beck's Dark
  - Beck's Alkoholfrei
  - Beck's Oktoberfest
- Budweiser
  - Bud Dry
  - Bud Extra
  - Bud Lime
  - Budweiser Black Crown
- Bud Light
  - Bud Light Chelada
  - Bud Light Lime
- Corona
  - Corona Extra
  - Corona Latte
  - Estrella
  - Modelo Especial
  - Modelo Light
  - Negra Modelo
  - Pacífico
  - Victoria
- Hoegaarden
- Leffe
  - Leffe Brown
  - Leffe Blonde
  - Leffe Ruby
  - Leffe Printemps
- Stella Artois
  - Artois Bock

=== Europe ===
- Beck's (Germany)
  - Beck's Dark
  - Beck's Alkoholfrei
  - Beck's Oktoberfest
  - Beck's Premier Light
- Belle-Vue (Belgium)
- Boddingtons (United Kingdom)
- Brouwerij Bosteels (Belgium)
  - Pauwel Kwak
  - Tripel Karmeliet
- Breda (Belgium)
- Camden Town Brewery (UK)
- Chernigivske (Ukraine)
- Diebels (Germany)
- Diekirch (Luxembourg)
  - Diekirch Grand Cru
  - Diekirch Grande Réserve
  - Diekirch Exclusive
- Dimix (Germany)
- Dommelsch (Netherlands)
  - Dommelsch Pilsener
  - Dommelsch Ice
  - Dommelsch Dominator
- Dutch Gold (Netherlands)
- Franziskaner (Germany)
- Ginette (Belgium)
- Gilde Ratskeller (Germany)
- Haake-Beck (Germany)
- Hasseröder (Germany)
- Hertog Jan (Netherlands)
  - Peeterman Artois (Belgium)
  - Primator
  - Oud Bruin
  - Grand Prestige
  - Tripel
  - Dubbel
  - Winterbier
  - Bockbier
  - Meibock
- Hoegaarden (Belgium)
  - Hougaerdse Das
- Hop Hound Amber Wheat
- Julius (Belgium)
- Jupiler (Belgium)
  - Jupiler N.A.
  - Jupiler Blue
  - Jupiler Tauro
- Klinskoye (Russia)
  - Klinskoye Svetloye
  - Klinskoye Zolotoye
  - Klinskoye Luxik
  - Klinskoye Redkoye
  - Klinskoye Arriva
  - Klinskoye Samurai
- La Bécasse (Belgium)
  - La Bécasse Kriek
  - La Bécasse Raspberry
  - La Bécasse Gueuze
- Leffe (Belgium)
  - Leffe Brown
  - Leffe Blonde
  - Leffe Ruby
  - Leffe Printemps
- Löwenbräu (Germany)
  - Löwenbräu Alkoholfrei
  - Löwenbräu Dunkel
  - Löwenbräu Löwen Weisse
  - Löwenbräu Original
  - Löwenbräu Oktoberfestbier
  - Löwenbräu Premium Pils
  - Löwenbräu Radler
  - Löwenbräu Schwarze Weisse
  - Löwenbräu Triumphator
  - Löwenbräu Urtyp
- Mousel (Luxembourg)
- Noroc (Romania)
- Oranjeboom (Netherlands)
- Permskoye Gubernskoye (Russia)
  - Permskoye Gubernskoye Svetloye
- Piedboeuf (Belgium)
  - Piedboeuf Blond
  - Piedboeuf Brown
  - Piedboeuf Triple
- Red Bridge (Luxembourg)
- Rifey (Russia)
- Rohan (Ukraine)
  - Rohan Lehke
  - Rohan Tradytsiyne
  - Rohan Monastyrske Temne
  - Rohan Veselyi Monach
  - Rohan Bezalkoholne
- Safir (Belgium)
- Sibirskaya Korona (Siberian Crown)(Russia)
- Spaten (Germany)
  - Spaten Alkoholfrei
  - Spaten Diät-Pils
  - Spaten Münchner Hell
  - Spaten Oktoberfestbier
  - Spaten Optimator
  - Spaten Pils
- St. Pauli Girl (Germany)
  - St. Pauli Girl Lager
  - St. Pauli Girl Special Dark
  - St. Pauli Girl Non-Alcoholic
- Taller (Ukraine)
- Tinkov Russian Lager (Russia)
- Tolstiak (Russia)
  - Tolstiak Dobroye
  - Tolstiak Svetloye
  - Tolstiak Zaboristoye
  - Tolstiak Krepkoye
  - Tolstiak Grechisnoye
- Via Roma
- Victoria, strong blond Belgian beer (Belgium)
- Vieux Temps (Belgium)
- Volzhanin (Russia)
- Wild Series
  - Wild Blue
  - Wild Black
  - Wild Red
- Yantar (Ukraine)

=== Asia / Pacific ===
- Aleston (South Korea)
- Baisha (China)
- Bergen bräu (South Korea)
- Blue Girl (South Korea)
- Beck's Ice (India)
- Boxing Cat (China)
- Cafri (South Korea)
- Cass (South Korea)
  - Cass Fresh
  - Cass Light
  - Cass Red
  - Cass Lemon
  - Cass Beats
- Dester (South Korea)
- Double Deer (China)
  - E-Generation
  - Premium Light
  - Dry Beer
- Essential Beer (South Korea)
- Guam USA (South Korea)
- GuoGuang (China)
- Harbin (China)
- Haywards 5000 (India)
- Jinlin (China)
- Jinlongquan (China)
  - Draft
  - Refreshing
- Kaiba (China)
- KK (China)
- Nanchang (China)
- OB (South Korea)
- Red Rock (South Korea)
- Red Shiliang (China)
- Santai (China)
- Sedrin (China)
- Sonderberg (South Korea)
- Southern Bay brew hole
- Suntory (South Korea)
- The Hand & Malt (South Korea)
- Yali (China)
- Zizhulin (China)
- Zhujiang (China)

=== Americas ===
- 911 (Dominican Republic)
- Aguila (Colombia)
- Alexander Keith's (Canada)
  - Keith's IPA
  - Keith's White
  - Keith's Dark
  - Keith's Red
  - Keith's Light
  - Keith's Regular
  - Keith's Hop Series
- Andes (Argentina)
- Antarctica (Brazil)
- Aqua Fratelli Vita (Brazil)
- Archibald (Canada)
  - La Chipie
  - La Joufflue
  - La Matante
  - La Belle-Mère
  - La Ciboire
  - La Nuit Blanche
- Babe Wines
- Banded Peak (Canada)
- Baviera (Paraguay)
- Beach Day Every Day (Canada)
  - Beach Peach
  - Berry Punch
  - Orange Beach
  - Smash
- BeatBox
- Best Damn Brewing Company
  - Best Damn Root Beer
  - Best Damn Apple Ale
- Blue Star (Canada)
- Bogotá Beer Company (Colombia)
- Bohemia (Brazil)
  - Bohemia Pilsen
  - Bohemia Escura
  - Bohemia Weiss
  - Bohemia Royal Ale
  - Bohemia Confraria
  - Bohemia Oaken
- Bohemia (Dominican Republic)
- Bohemia Light (Dominican Republic)
- Bon & Viv (USA)
- Brahma
- Brahva Gold (Guatemala)
- Brahva Beats (Guatemala)
- Budweiser
  - Budweiser Chelada
  - Bud Dry
  - Bud Extra
  - Bud Ice
  - Bud Ice Light
  - Bud Lime
  - Budweiser American Ale
  - Budweiser Black Crown
  - Budweiser Freedom Reserve
  - Budweiser Magnum
  - Budweiser Select
  - Budweiser Select 55
- Bud Light
  - Bud Light Chelada
  - Bud Light Golden Wheat
  - Bud Light Lime
  - Bud Light Orange
  - Bud Light Platinum
- Busch
- Busch Light
- Caracu (Brazil)
- Cervecería Boliviana Nacional (Bolivia)
  - Bi-Cervecina El Inca
  - Ducal
  - Huari
  - Maltín
  - Paceña
  - Paceña Centenario
  - Taquiña
- Cervecería Nacional (Panamá)
  - Atlas
  - Atlas Golden Light
  - Balboa
  - Balboa Ice
  - Malta Vigor
- Cervejaria Colorado (Brazil)
- Cervecerias Chile (Chile)
- Cervejaria Wäls (Brazil)
  - Báltica (Chile)
  - Becker (Chile)
- Cusqueña (Peru)
- Devils Backbone Brewing Company (USA)
- Elysian Brewing Company (USA)
- Four Peaks (USA)
- Golden Road (USA)
- Goose Island Brewery (USA)
- Green Valley (USA)
- Grupo Modelo (Mexico) Acquired in 2013
  - Barrilito
  - Corona Cero
  - Corona Extra
  - Corona Ligera
  - Corona Light
  - Cervecería Bocanegra
  - Cervecería Cucapá
  - Cervecería de Tijuana
  - León
  - Modelo Trigo
  - Montejo
  - Pacifico Clara
  - Pacifico Light
  - Pacifico Suave
  - Vicky Chamoy
  - Vicky Chelada
  - Victoria
  - Victoria Ligera
- Hurricane (USA)
- Índica (Uruguay)
- Johnny Appleseed (USA)
- Karbach Brewing Company (USA)
- King Cobra (USA)
- Kokanee (Canada)
  - Kokanee
  - Kokanee Gold
  - Kokanee Light
  - Kokanee Frost
  - Kootenay True Ale
- Labatt Family (Canada) Acquired in 1995
  - Labatt Blue
  - Labatt Blue Dry
  - Labatt Blue Light
  - Labatt Club
  - Labatt .5
  - Labatt Lite
  - Labatt Lucky Lager
  - Labatt 50
  - John Labatt Classic
  - Labatt Genuine
  - Labatt Extra Dry Lager
  - Labatt Wildcat
  - Labatt Ice
  - Jockey Club
  - Blue Star

NOTE: The U.S. version of Labatt is distributed by North American Breweries due to antitrust issues.

- LandShark (USA)
- Lakeport Family (Canada) Acquired in 2007
  - Lakeport Pilsener
  - Lakeport Honey Lager
  - Lakeport Strong
  - Lakeport Ice
  - Lakeport Ale
  - Lakeport Light
  - Lakeport Red
  - Steeler
  - Brava
  - Wee Willy
- Liber (Brazil)
- Marathon (Brazil)
- Michelob
  - Michelob Light
  - Michelob Honey Lager
  - Michelob Honey Wheat
  - Michelob Pale Ale
  - Michelob Ultra
- Mill Street Brewery (Canada)
- Malta Morena (Dominican Republic)
- Natural Light
  - Natural
  - Natural Ice
  - Natty Daddy
- Norteña (Uruguay)
- Oceánica (Uruguay)
- Oland Export Ale (Canada)
- Original (Brazil)
- Patagonia (Argentina)
- Patricia (Uruguay)
- Pilsen (Paraguay)
- Pilsen Ñande (Paraguay)
  - Pilsen Ñande Roja
  - Pilsen Ñande Blanca
  - Pilsen Ñande Negra
- Pilsener (Ecuador)
- Pilsener Light (Ecuador)
- Poker (Colombia)
- Presidente Light (Dominican Republic)
- Presidente Black (Dominican Republic)
- Quilmes (Argentina)
- Rolling Rock
  - Rolling Rock Light
  - Rolling Rock Red
- Ron Barceló (Dominican Republic)
- Schooner Lager (Canada)
- Serramalte (Brazil)
- Spiked Seltzer (USA)
- Spykes (USA)
- Sukita (Brazil)
- Turning Point (Canada)
  - Stanley Park
  - Hell's Gate
- Veza Sur Brewing Company (USA)
- Wicked Weed (USA)
- Ziegenbock

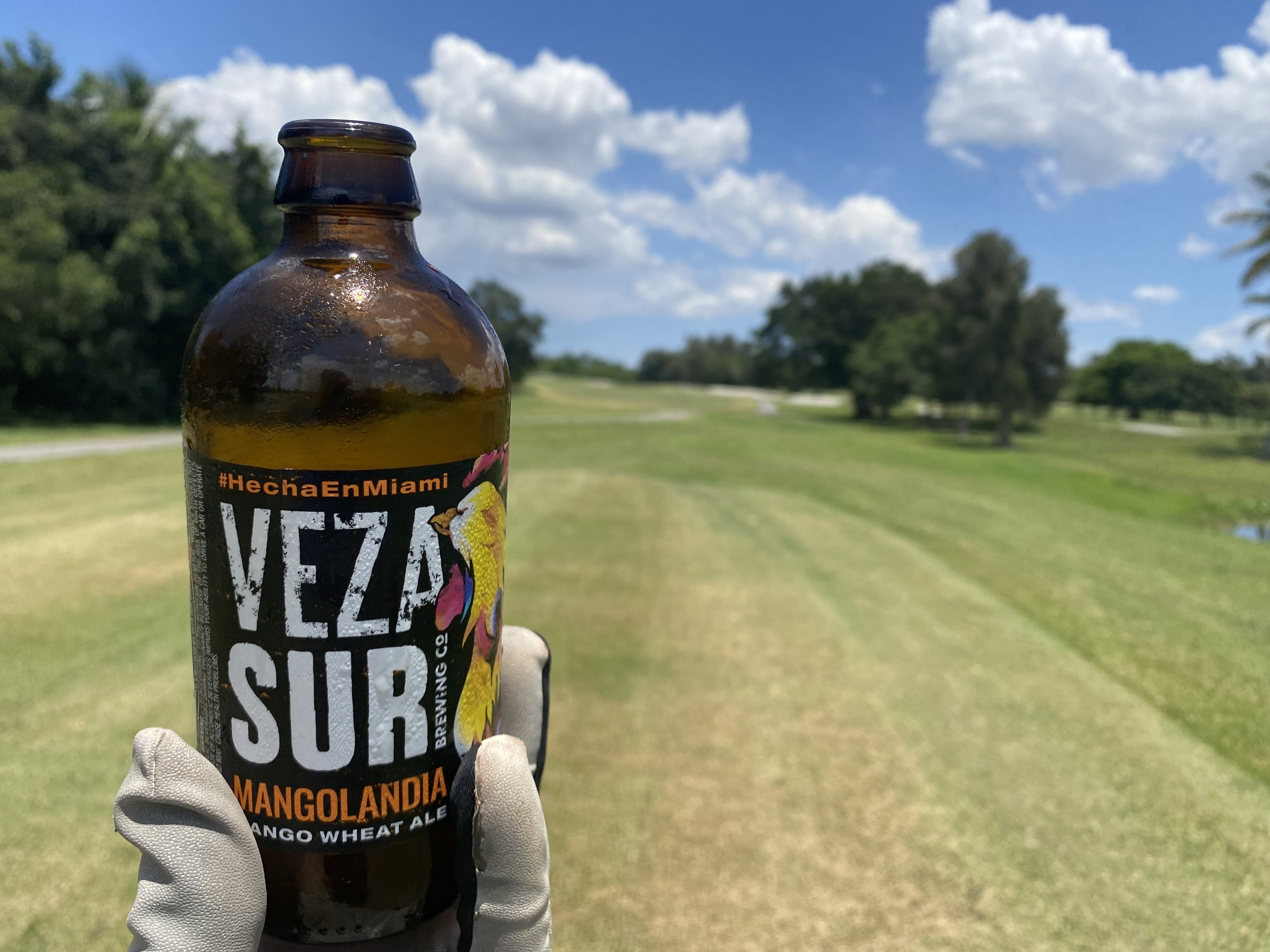
Veza Sur Mangolandia on a golf course

=== Africa ===
- South African Breweries (SAB)
  - Brutal fruit
  - Black Crown
  - Carling Black Label
  - Carver's Weis
  - Castle Lager
    - Castle Lite
    - Castle Milk Stout
    - Castle Free
  - Corona
  - Flying Fish
    - Flying Fish Chill
  - Hansa Pilsner
  - Liberado
  - Newlands Spring
  - Redds
- Cervejas De Moçambique (CDM)
  - 2M
  - 2M Flow
  - Manica
  - Laurentina
    - Laurentina Premium
    - Laurentina Preta
    - Laurentina Clara
  - Impala (cassava-based beer)
  - Dourada

=== Services and Products ===
- SmartBarley: a tech collaboration with Sentera
- 100+ Accelerator: an accelerator program for startup businesses set up by AB InBev in 2018, in conjunction with Coca-Cola, Colgate-Palmolive and Unilever.
