= Texas pride =

Sense of demographic pride felt by people in Texas

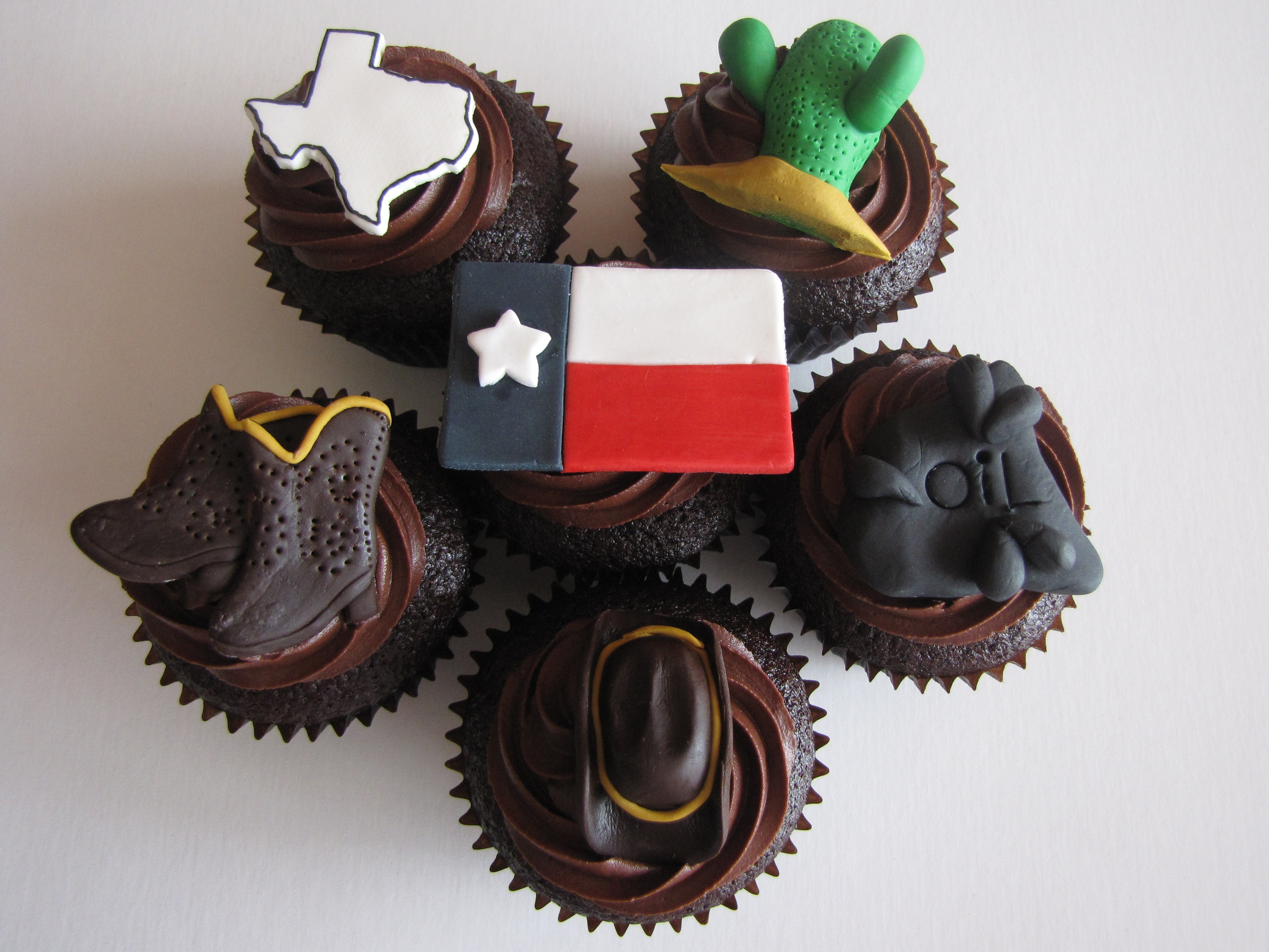
A portrayal of Texas pride on every day items such as cupcakes

The particular and complex culture and history of Texas has led to an extraordinarily strong sense of state level pride and individuality.

The official state nickname of Texas is "The Lone Star State" as a tribute to the state's time as a sovereign nation. While the phrase is presumed to date to the 19th century, the nickname was not made official until the 84th Texas Legislature in 2015. According to the resolution,

Whatever its origins, and whatever its uses, from the serious to the playful, the phrase "the Lone Star State" has achieved universal currency as a sharp and memorable way to evoke the unique legacy of Texas and the indomitable spirit of its people; ...

== Background ==
The Battle of the Alamo was a pivotal event in Texas history that is seen as a source of Texas pride. Figures such as James Bowie, David Crockett, as well as lesser-known Texas heroes, like James Bonham and Almeron Dickenson, began to emerge as the cause for the fight became more personal and the pride in Texas and desire for independence grew. Although the battle was lost, the phrase "Remember the Alamo" is part of its legacy. Texas gained independence in 1836 after defeating the Mexican army at The Battle of San Jacinto, and it remained an independent nation until it was annexed by the U.S. in 1845.

== Media ==
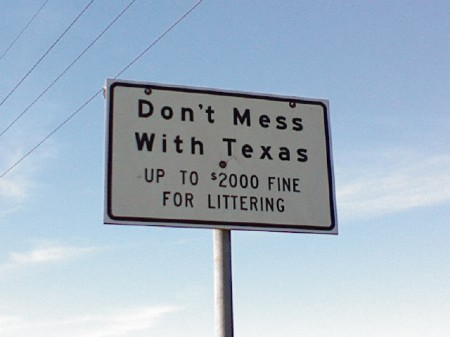
A don't mess with Texas anti-littering sign

Media plays a large role in promoting this cultural unity and nationalistic state pride. The song "Deep in the Heart of Texas" can be heard at events across the state. Sports teams like the San Antonio Spurs, Texas Rangers, Dallas Stars, and Dallas Mavericks feature this song at home games.

In 1985, the Texas Department of Transportation launched the Don't Mess With Texas campaign. Originally used to discourage littering on Texas roadways, it has morphed into a slogan that is used to promote Texas pride.

T.R. Fehrenbach, considered one of Texas's greatest historians, noted that "Texas was not a society, but a people" and he believed that the history of Texas was so powerful that it was "based on, but not limited by facts."

== Psychology ==
Demographic pride in Texas is taught to children at a young age. A significant portion of the elementary and middle school social studies curriculum is dedicated to Texas history.

In a study performed by the University of Texas at Austin, researchers found that those who most strongly identified as "Texan" were not only those who were born and raised in Texas, but also those who immigrated to Texas from another state as a young child.

"The fact that both native-born Texans as well as those who came to Texas from another state as children are so much more likely to strongly identify with Texas than the other groups suggests that Texas identity is in large part forged in school, especially in grades 4 through 7 when students are required to study Texas history in social studies class."

Texas law requires that the pledge of allegiance to the United States flag as well as the pledge of allegiance to the Texas flag be said on a daily basis in all public charter schools, followed by a moment of silence.

Portrayals of Texas pride manifest themselves in visible ways such as "Don't Mess With Texas" t-shirts, Texas-shaped jewelry, tattoos, signs, and phrases.

== See also ==
- Culture of Texas
