= Legacy of the Battle of the Alamo =

Legacy of 1836 Texas Revolution battle

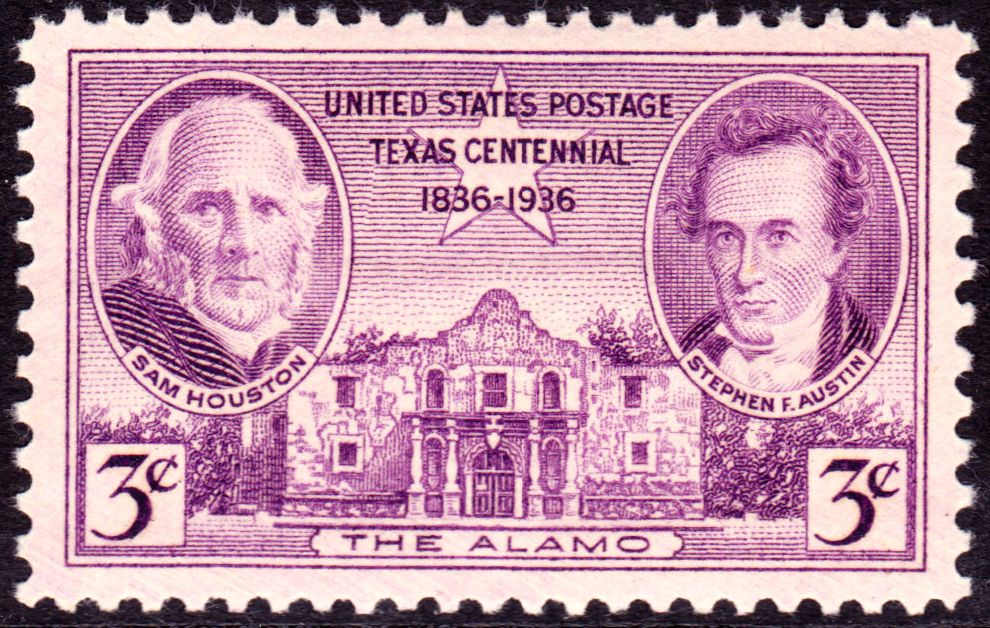
~ The Alamo ~ Texas Centennial Issue of 1936

Reverse side of the seal of Texas, featuring the "Remember the Alamo" battle cry as well the Alamo mission itself

The Battle of the Alamo left a substantial legacy and influence within American culture and is an event that is told from the perspective of the vanquished.

== Perception ==
Within weeks of the battle, it began to be compared to the Greek stand at the Battle of Thermopylae.

Efforts to preserve the Alamo have largely been an Anglo-American cause. The first major calls to restore parts of the Alamo occurred after 1860, as English-speaking settlers began to outnumber those of Mexican heritage. Likewise, according to Schoelwer, within "the development of Alamo imagery has been an almost exclusively American endeavor" that focuses on the Texian defenders, with less emphasis given to the Mexican Army or the Tejano soldiers who served in the Texian Army. Many Tejanos viewed the Alamo as more than just a battle site, but they or their ancestors had experienced the benefits of the Alamo compound when it served as a mission, a hospital, or a military post. Americans had arrived in Texas much later, when the Alamo no longer served in those roles, and they tended to see the compound solely in relation to the battle.

According to the author Richard R. Flores, in the early 20th century, the Alamo was perceived by many in the majority white population of Texas as a symbol of white supremacy over the minority Mexican population. That symbolism followed the late-19th-century and the early-20th-century development of a new capitalist system in Texas that placed whites at the top of the social ladder as profit-earners and Mexicans at the bottom of the social ladder as wage-earners.

In Mexico, perceptions of the battle have often mirrored those of Santa Anna. Initially, reports of the Mexican victory concentrated on glorifying Santa Anna, especially among newspapers that supported the centralist cause. Typical headlines included, "Immortal Glory to the Illustrious General Santa Anna: Eternal Praise to the Invincible Army of Mexico". Within days of the news, people began composing patriotic marching songs about Santa Anna and his victory at the Alamo. Santa Anna's political opponents were displeased that the focus had shifted to him; within days, newspapers supporting the federalist viewpoint began questioning whether the victory had come at too great a cost and whether it would actually help Mexico. Many of the newspapers were disenchanted with Santa Anna's deployment of General Martin Perfecto de Cos, who had been paroled back to Mexico after the Siege of Bexar if he no longer took up arms against Texians.

On April 27, 1836, Mexican Secretary of War José María Tornel announced that Mexican soldiers who participated in the campaign to retake Texas would be eligible to receive a special medal. To commemorate the Battle of the Alamo, the establishment date for the program was retroactively set to March 6, 1836. Within weeks, however, the Mexican government learned of Santa Anna's defeat and capture at the Battle of San Jacinto and so the medal program was immediately cancelled. The Texas campaign, including the Battle of the Alamo, was soon overshadowed by the Mexican–American War of the 1840s.

In the 1960s, the battle was often used as a historical parallel to the Vietnam War. U.S. President Lyndon Johnson, whose father had authored the 1905 legislation that allowed the State of Texas to buy the long barracks, often compared the war to the Alamo. He remarked once that his decision to send more troops to Southeast Asia was "Just like the Alamo, somebody damn well needed to go to their aid." Those and other similar remarks prompted a strong anti-Alamo backlash in the United States. The New York Times editorialized, "If Americans must remember the Alamo, let's remember that gallant men died needlessly in that old mission and that their sacrifice led eventually to a war that reflects little credit on the United States.... To persevere in folly is no virtue. To dare to retreat from error can be the highest form of courage." In the late 1960s and the early 1970s, numerous anti-war protests were held on the grounds of the Alamo.

A program on the Craft of Writing: Rewriting History on Forget the Alamo: The Rise and Fall of an American Myth with Bryan Burrough and Chris Tomlinson co-sponsored by Writers' League of Texas with the Bullock Texas State History Museum, included the development of the Alamo's mythos during the Jim Crow era. It was canceled four hours before the program time by Republican Lieutenant-Governor Dan Patrick: “As a member of the Preservation Board, I told staff to cancel this event as soon as I found out about it,” he wrote on Twitter. ”This fact-free rewriting of TX history has no place @BullockMuseum.” The book received mostly positive reviews, including from The Wall Street Journal and The Washington Post, with a consensus that it builds on widely accepted academic research. The third author, Jason Stanford, wrote one of the myths about the Alamo "leaves... out that Texians opposed Mexican laws that would free the enslaved workers they needed to farm cotton." That censorship is occurring when Texas conservatives, like those across the country, are against the teaching of critical race theory which the book represents.

== Alamo Mission ==
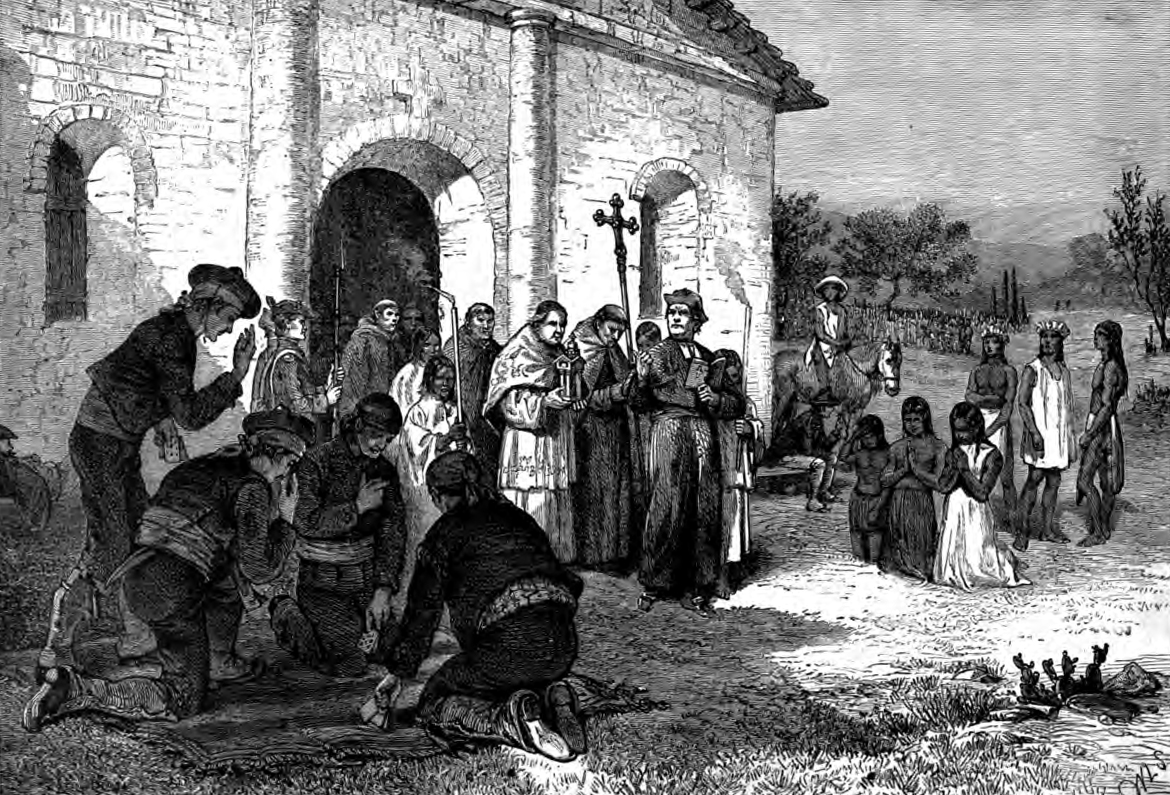
An artist's conception of how the Alamo was used during its years as a Spanish mission

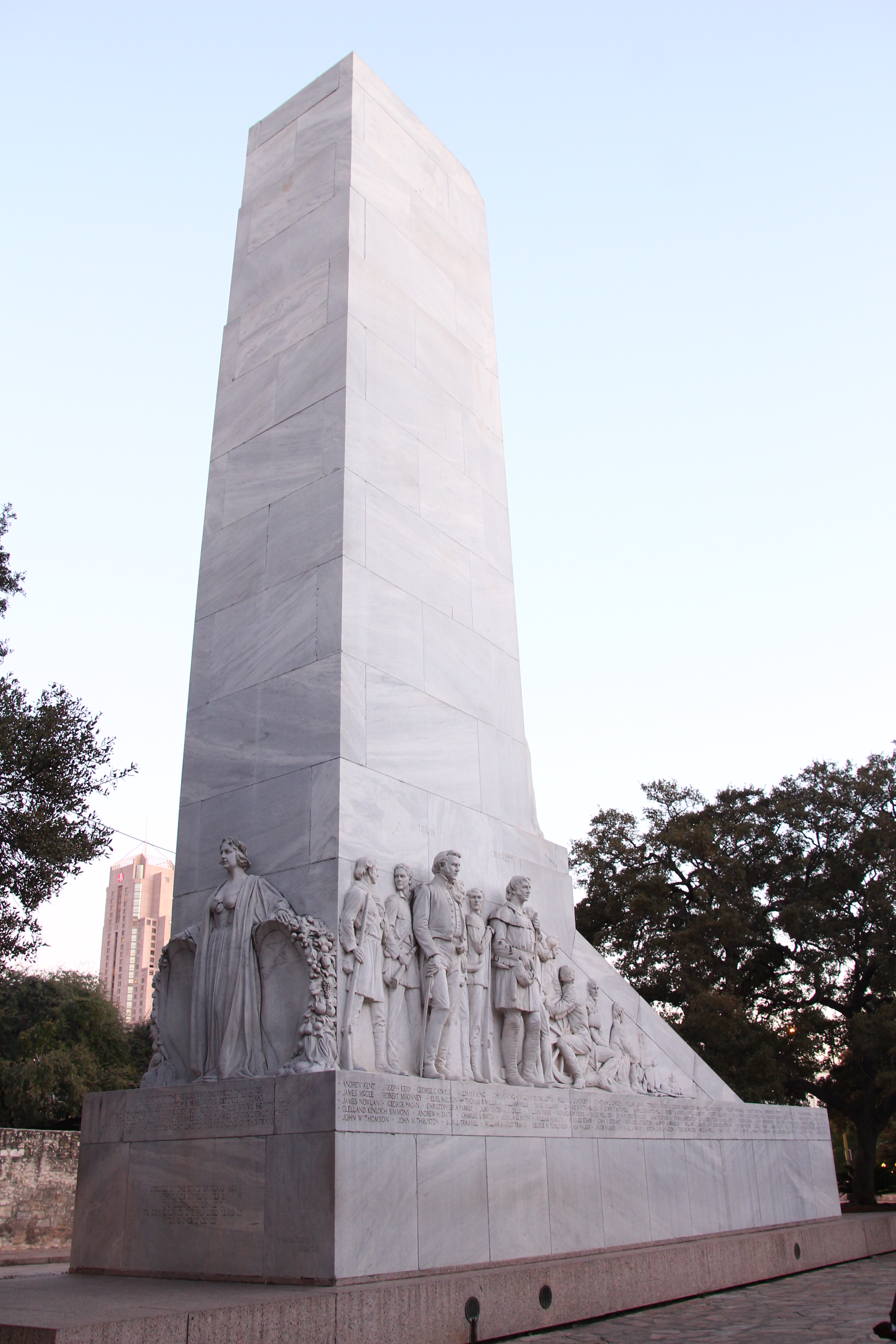
Memorial to the fallen soldiers at the Alamo

After the Mexican victory at the Battle of the Alamo, Mexican troops quartered in the Alamo Mission. As the Mexican army retreated from Texas following the Battle of San Jacinto, it tore down many of the walls and burned the palisade that Crockett had defended. Within the next several decades, various buildings in the complex were torn down, and in 1850, the United States Army added a gable to the top of the chapel. Speculation is that the gable was originally at Mission San José because of its presence at that mission in 1846–1848 sketches and its absence in later images.

Today, the remnants of the Alamo are in Downtown San Antonio, Texas. The church building remains standing and serves as an official state shrine to the Texian defenders. As the 20th century began, many Texans advocated razing the remaining building, the Long Barrack. A wealthy rancher's daughter, Clara Driscoll, purchased the building to serve as a museum. The Texas Legislature later bought the property and appointed the Daughters of the Republic of Texas as permanent caretakers. In front of the church, in the center of Downtown San Antonio's Alamo Plaza, is a cenotaph, designed by Pompeo Coppini and erected in 1939, which commemorates the Texians who died during the battle. According to Bill Groneman's Battlefields of Texas, the Alamo has become "the most popular tourist site in Texas."

== Literature ==
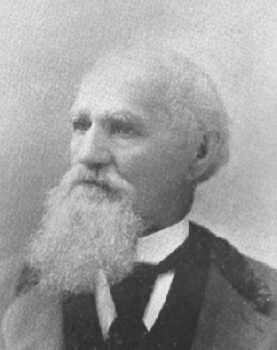
John Henry Brown wrote the first history of the battle, which was published in 1843.

Many of the Mexican officers who participated in the battle left memoirs, although some were not written until decades after the battle. Among those who provided written accounts of the battle were Antonio López de Santa Anna, Vicente Filisola, José Enrique de la Peña, José Juan Sánchez Navarro, Juan N. Almonte, and Francisco Becerra. Texians Juan Seguín and John Sutherland also left memoirs, although some historians believe Sutherland was not at the Alamo and wrote his memoirs from hearsay. Of the Texian survivors, more weight was given to the account of Susannah Dickinson, the only American adult to live. The other survivors, including former slaves and several Tejanos, were not lauded as much as Dickinson.

The first report of the names of the Texian victims of the battle came in the March 24, 1836 issue of the Telegraph and Texas Register. The 115 names on the list came from John Smith and Gerald Navan, who had left as couriers. In 1843 former Texas Ranger and amateur historian John Henry Brown wrote and published the first history of the battle, a pamphlet called The Fall of the Alamo. He followed this in 1853 with a second pamphlet called Facts of the Alamo, Last Days of Crockett and Other Sketches of Texas. No copies of the pamphlets have survived. The next major treatment of the battle was Reuben Potter's The Fall of the Alamo, originally published in 1860 and republished in The Magazine of American History in 1878. Potter based his work on interviews with many of the survivors of the Battle of the Alamo. One of the most used secondary sources about the Alamo is Amelia W. Williams's doctoral dissertation, "Critical Study of the Siege of the Alamo and of the Personnel of Its Defenders". Completed in 1931, it attempted to positively identify all of the Texians who died during the battle. Her list was used to choose the names carved into the cenotaph memorial in 1936. Several historians, including Thomas Ricks Lindley, Thomas Lloyd Miller, and Richard G. Santos, believe her list included men who had not died at the Alamo. Despite the errors in some of her work, Williams collected a large amount of information and her work serves as a starting point for many historians. The first full-length, non-fiction book covering the battle was not published until 1948, when John Myers Myers' The Alamo was released. Since then, a litany of books have followed, most notably Walter Lord's seminal work in 1961, A Time to Stand.

As the 19th century progressed, the battle began to appear as a plot device in many novels and plays. In 1869, novelists Jeremiah Clemens and Bernard Lile wrote fictionalized accounts of the battle. Novelist Amelia Barr produced her own fictional version, Remember the Alamo, in 1888. In her book, Alamo Images, Susan Pendergrast Schoelwer noted that in these early novels "the Alamo passages seem almost incidental to the main plot, included perhaps as a means of attracting interest and encouraging sales".

== Art ==
The first artistic depiction of the battle came in 1838 in John Milton Niles's History of South America and Mexico. In Schoelwer's opinion, the scenes "bore absolutely no resemblance to the original". These and other early paintings often depicted buildings that looked nothing like the Alamo and battles that occurred very differently than the 1836 battle at the Alamo. However, their presence and popularity increased the Alamo's fame, and likely contributed to the early waves of tourism at the battle site.

== Film ==
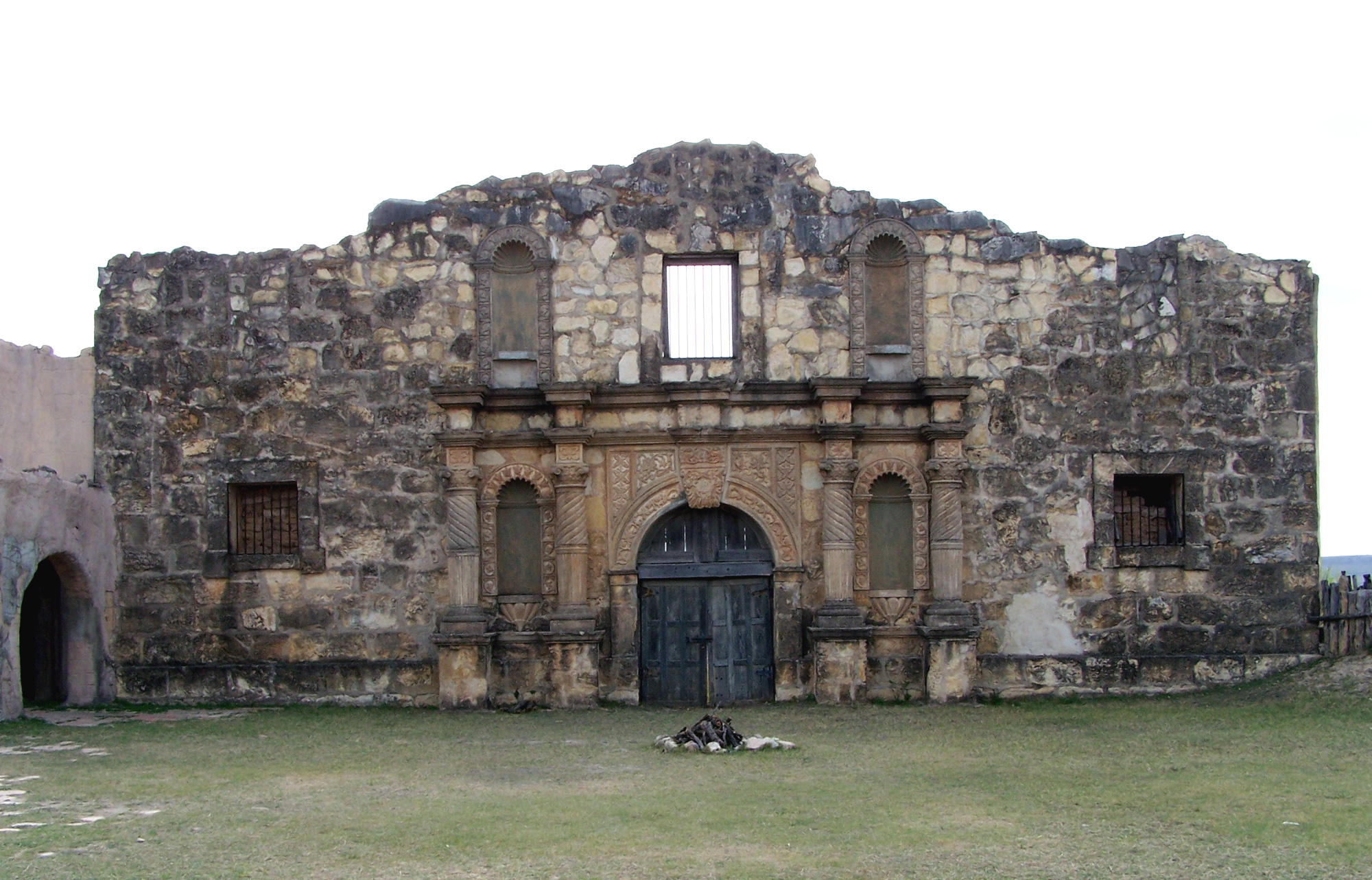
This replica of the Alamo, at Alamo Village, was built for the 1960 John Wayne film The Alamo.

According to Todish et al., "there can be little doubt that most Americans have probably formed many of their opinions on what occurred at the Alamo not from books, but from the various movies made about the battle." The first film version of the battle appeared in 1911, when Gaston Melies directed The Immortal Alamo, which has since been lost. Through the next four decades, several other movies were released and variously focus on Davy Crocket, Almeron Dickinson, and Louis Rose. The Alamo achieved prominence on television in 1955 with Walt Disney's Davy Crockett: King of the Wild Frontier, which was largely based on myth. In the early 1950s, John Wayne began developing a film based on the Battle of the Alamo. When he left his contract with Republic Pictures, he was forced to leave behind a partial script. Republic Pictures had the script finished and developed into the 1955 movie The Last Command. Although the film had its historical inaccuracies, it was the most detailed of the films on the Texas Revolution. Wayne continued to develop an Alamo movie, which resulted in the 1960 film The Alamo, starring himself as Davy Crockett. Although the screenwriter James Edward Grant claimed to have done extensive historical research, according to Todish, "there is not a single scene in The Alamo which corresponds to an historically verifiable incident," and the historians J. Frank Dobie and Lon Tinkle demanded for their names to be removed from the credits as historical advisors. The movie was banned in Mexico. The set built for the movie, Alamo Village, includes a replica of the Alamo Mission and the Mexican city of San Antonio is still used as an active movie set.

As the 150th anniversary of the battle approached in the 1980s, several additional movies were made about the Alamo, including the made-for-television The Alamo: 13 Days to Glory, which Albert Nof regards as the most historically-accurate of all Alamo films. The movie Todish calls "the best theatrical film ever made about the Alamo" was also filmed in the 1980s. Filmed in IMAX format using historical re-enactors instead of professional actors, Alamo: The Price of Freedom is shown only in San Antonio, with several viewings per day at a theater near the Alamo. It runs only 45 minutes but has "an attention to detail and intensity that are remarkable". In 2004 another film, also called The Alamo, was released. Described by CNN as possibly "the most character-driven of all the movies made on the subject," the movie starred Billy Bob Thornton as Crockett, Dennis Quaid as Sam Houston, and Jason Patric as Bowie. However, the film was one of the year's biggest box office failures. In Pee-wee's Big Adventure, Pee-wee Herman's stolen bike is said by a fortune teller to be in the basement of the Alamo, but during a tour of the structure, he is told by the tour guide that the Alamo has no basement.

== Music ==
A number of songwriters have also been inspired by the Battle of the Alamo. For example:

- "Remember the Alamo" (1955), written by Texas folk the singer and songwriter Jane Bowers, was recorded by the Kingston Trio, Johnny Cash, Tex Ritter, Donovan and others.
- Tennessee Ernie Ford's cover of "The Ballad of Davy Crockett" (recorded February 7, 1955) spent 16 weeks on the country music charts to and peaked at number 4 in 1955.
- In 1960, Marty Robbins recorded a version of the song "The Ballad of the Alamo," which spent and flying at number 34.
- English band the Babe Ruth's song "The Mexican" (1972) is about the Mexican point of view.

== Replicas ==
Replicas of the Alamo have also appeared. One is that a 6,533 sq.ft residential home located in Spicewood just northwest of Austin. Built in 2007 and with an estimated value of $1.35 million. Rustic on the outside, it is far more luxurious on the interior than the real Alamo.

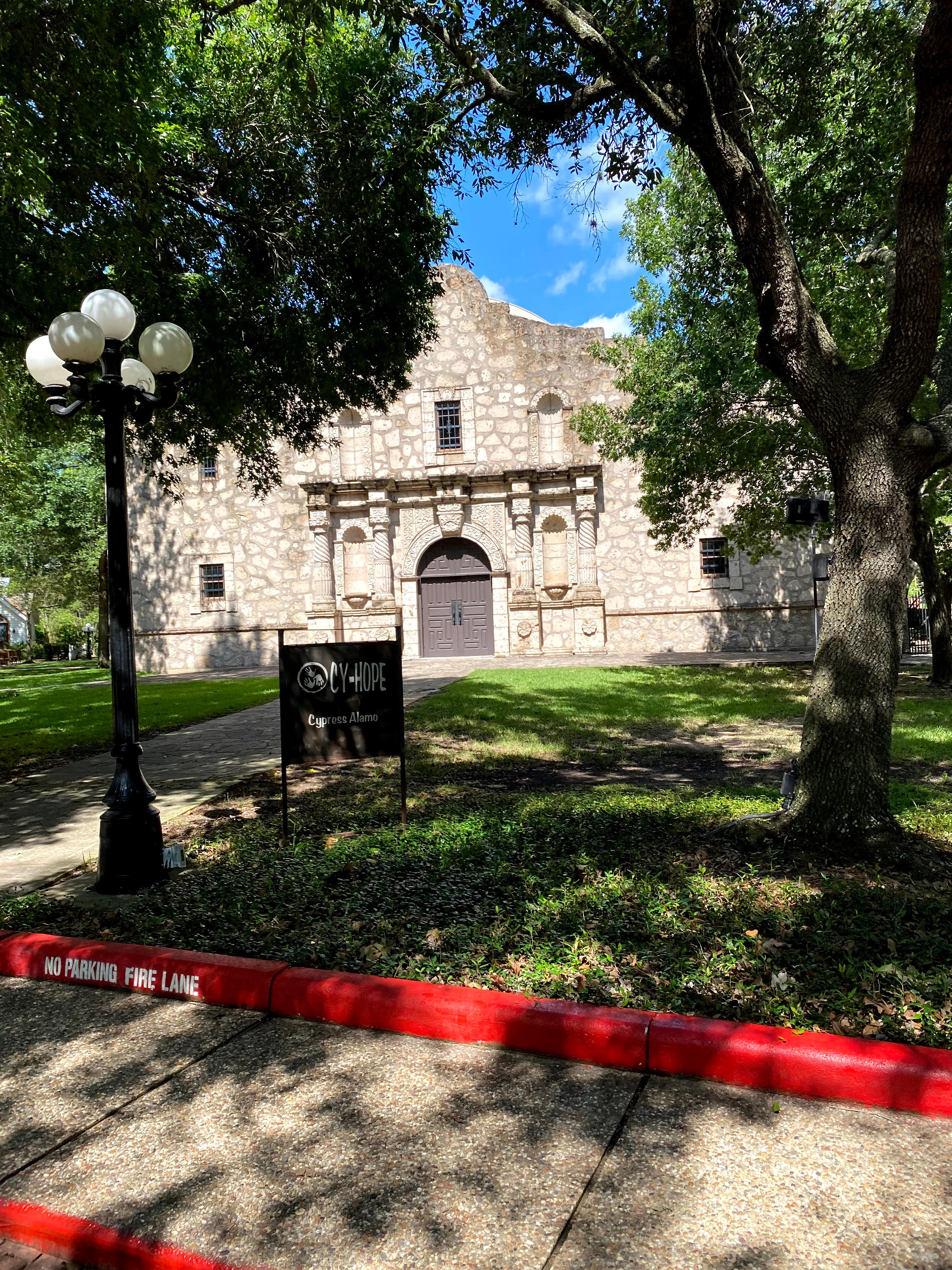
Replica of the Alamo located on the grounds of the Cy-Hope Counseling in Cypress.

Another replica of the historic mission is located on the grounds of the Cy-Hope foundation in Cypress. Built by Kwik Kopy owner and founder 'bud" Hadfield on the Kwik Kopy Northwest Forest Conference Training Center on Telge Road. The complex itself serves as a wedding reception and banquet hall with a seating apacity of 180. In mid 2020, the Cypress Alamo had suffered a decline in visits because of the COVID-19 pandemic.
