= Forget the Alamo =

Forget the Alamo may refer to:

- "Forget the Alamo", a 2002 episode of the animated television series Time Squad
- Forget the Alamo: The Rise and Fall of an American Myth, a 2021 non-fiction book about the Battle of the Alamo
