= Chris Tomlinson (disambiguation) =

Chris Tomlinson is a former English long jumper.

Chris Tomlinson may also refer to:

- Chris Tomlinson (politician) (born 1986), American politician
- Chris Tomlinson (journalist), American journalist
