= Sentimental Journey (aircraft) =

B-17G Flying Fortress bomber

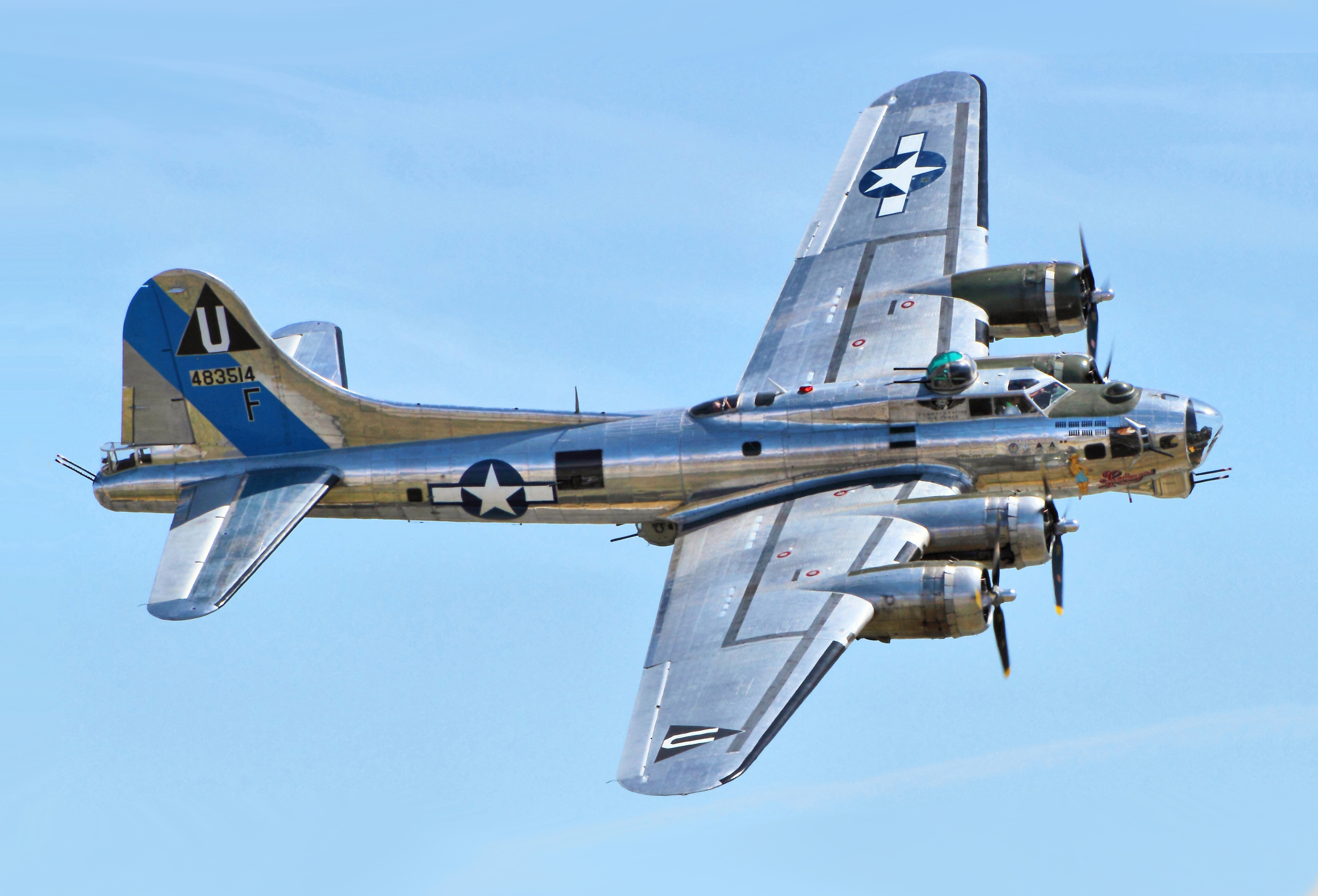
- Sentimental Journey, performing at the 2014 Chino Airshow in Chino, California

General information
- Type: B-17G-85-DL Flying Fortress
- Manufacturer: Boeing
- Owners: U.S. Army Air Forces; United States Air Force; Aero Union Corporation; Commemorative Air Force
- Registration: N9323Z
- Serial: USAF s/n 44-83514

History
- Manufactured: 1944
- First flight: 13 March 1945
- In service: 1944–1959 (military); 1959–1978, Aero Union Corporation
- Preserved at: Arizona Commemorative Air Force Museum

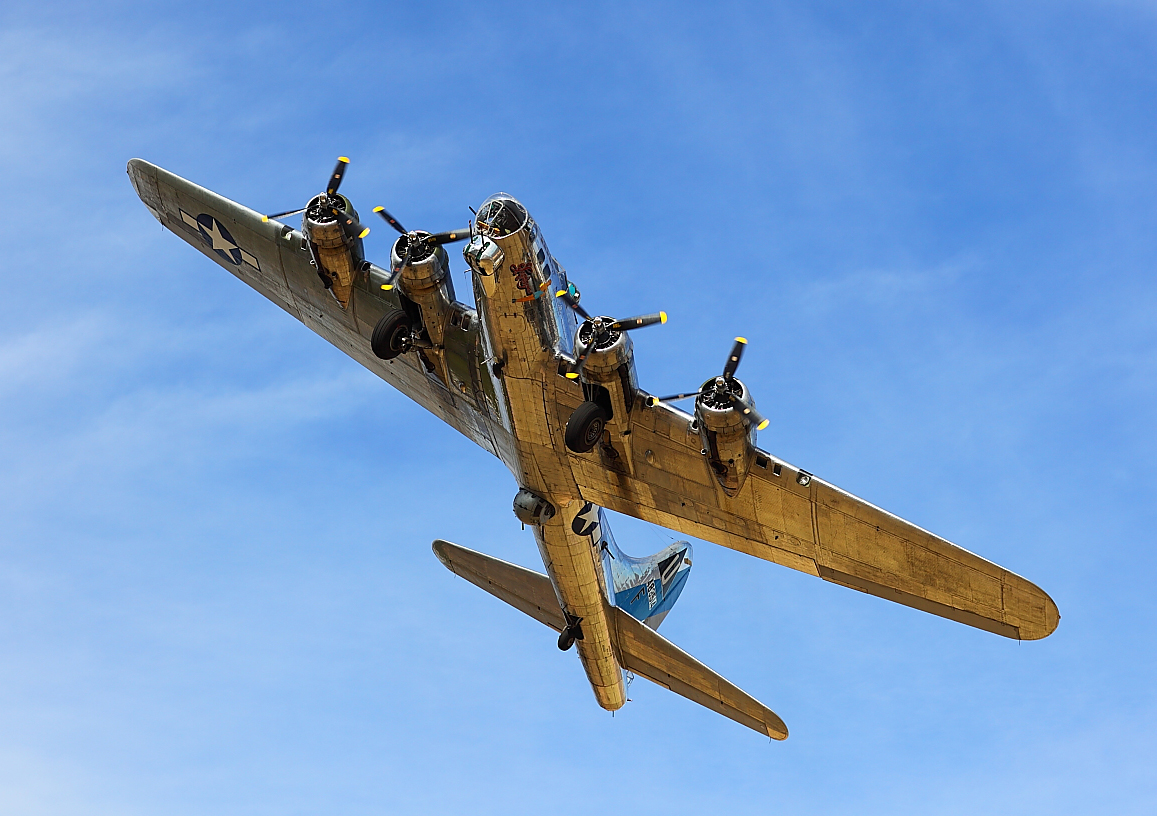
Sentimental Journey in flight in Mesa, Arizona in January 2009

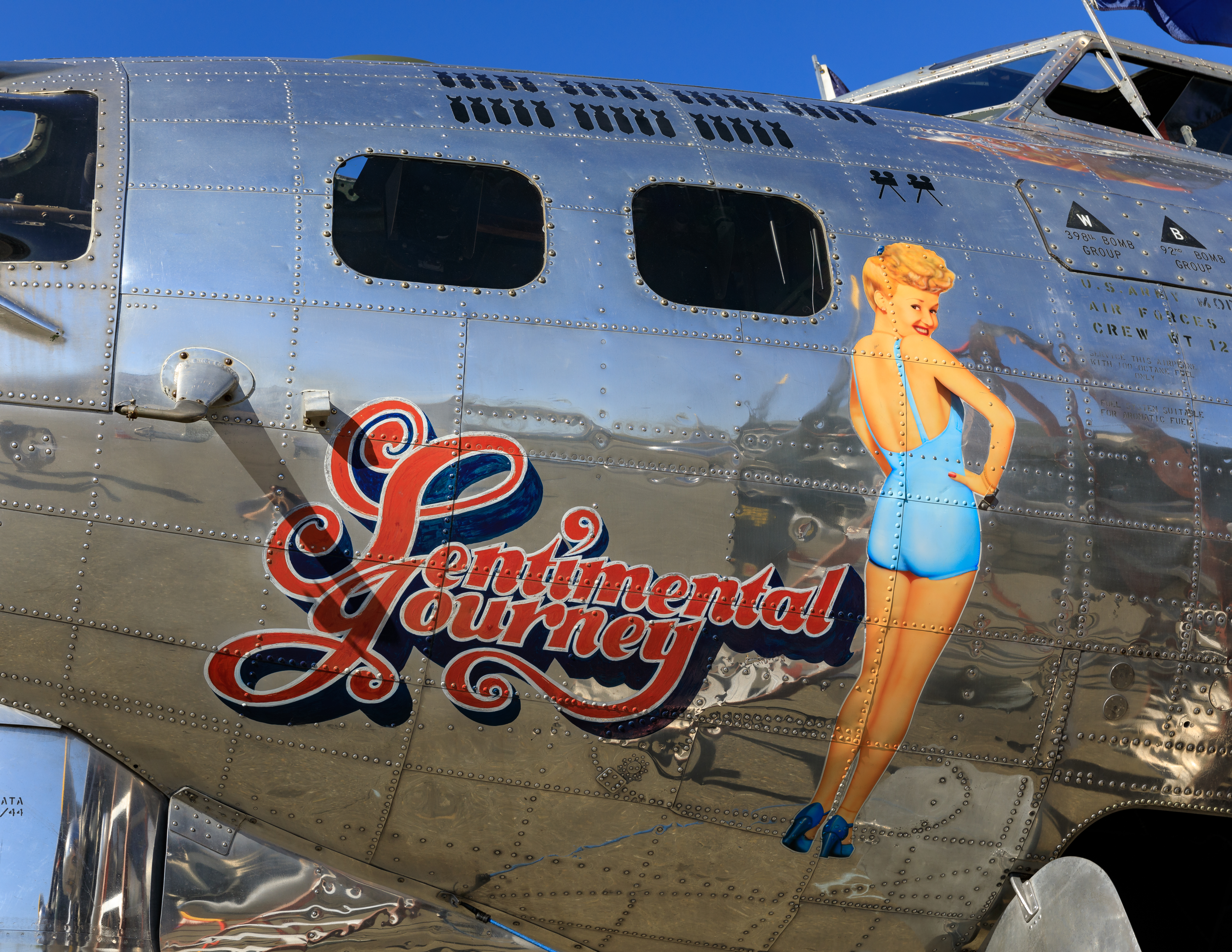
Sentimental Journey, close-up of nose art. Chico Air Museum, September 2021

Sentimental Journey (44-83514) is the nickname of a B-17G Flying Fortress bomber. It is based at the Commemorative Air Force Museum in Mesa, Arizona, US. The aircraft is regularly flown to airshows throughout North America.

The nose art features Betty Grable, the number one pinup girl of the World War II era. The aircraft's name takes after a song made very popular by Doris Day in 1945.

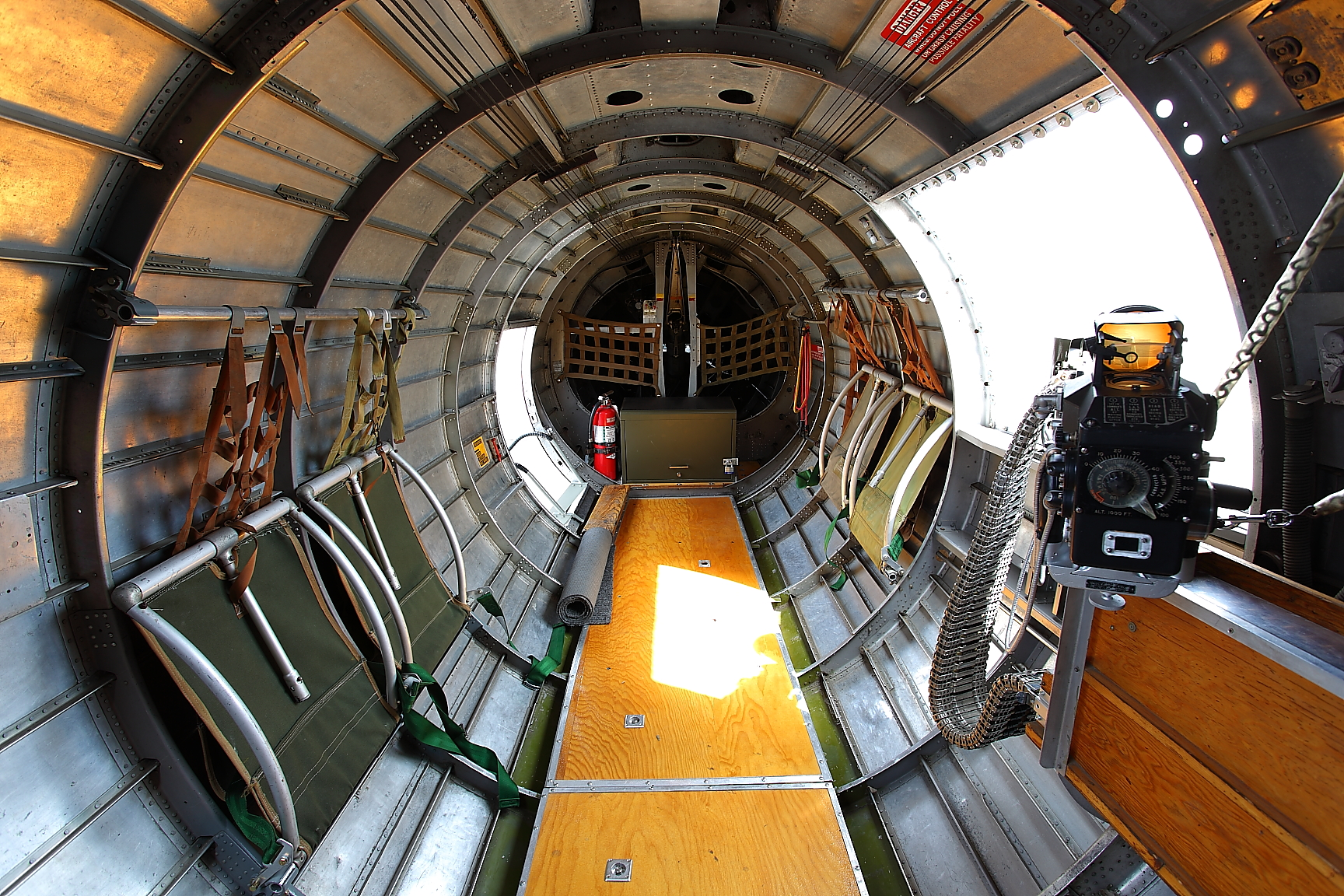
Fuselage of the bomber

== History ==
Boeing B-17G 44-83514 was built by Douglas Aircraft in late 1944, and was accepted by the U.S. Army Air Forces on 13 March 1945. Assigned to the Pacific theater for the remainder of the war, it was subsequently placed in storage in Japan. In 1947, the B-17G was reconfigured as a RB-17G for a new role in photo-mapping and assigned to Clark Field in Manila.

In 1950, the aircraft was transferred to Eglin Field, Florida and converted to a DB-17G for service as an air-sea rescue craft. During the 1950s, it was modified to a DB-17P standard, serving with the 3215th Drone Squadron at Patrick Air Force Base in Florida. One of its important missions was "Operation Greenhouse," the fourth postwar atmospheric nuclear weapon test series conducted by the United States during the spring of 1951. As a mother ship, the RB-17P directed unmanned, radio controlled B-17 drone aircraft to measure blast and thermal effects and to collect radioactive cloud samples. During the test, a drone aircraft would take off under ground control. A "mother ship", already airborne, would then come from behind, take control of the drone and fly it to the target area.

On 27 January 1959, the aircraft was transferred to military storage at Davis Monthan Air Force Base in Tucson, Arizona. After a few months storage, 83514 was acquired by the Aero Union Corporation of Chico, California, receiving civilian aircraft registration: N9323Z. For 18 years, the converted bomber flew as a forest fire fighter throughout the United States.

On 14 January 1978, at a membership banquet for the newly formed Arizona Wing of the Commemorative Air Force, Colonel Mike Clarke announced the donation of the aircraft to the CAF for assignment to the Arizona Wing. A contest was initiated by the local media to name the aircraft, which resulted in more than 800 entries, and the ultimate selection of the name "Sentimental Journey" with nose art featuring World War II pinup Betty Grable. Permission was secured from widower Harry James to add Betty Grable in her most tantalizing pose to complete the newly acquired bomber.

Although flyable, Sentimental Journey was not an accurate representative of the wartime B-17 bomber and in December 1981, the aircraft underwent an extensive restoration. By 1985, the addition of four operational turrets, operational bomb bay doors, navigator and radio operator stations, Norden bomb sight and machine guns completed the transformation to its original condition.

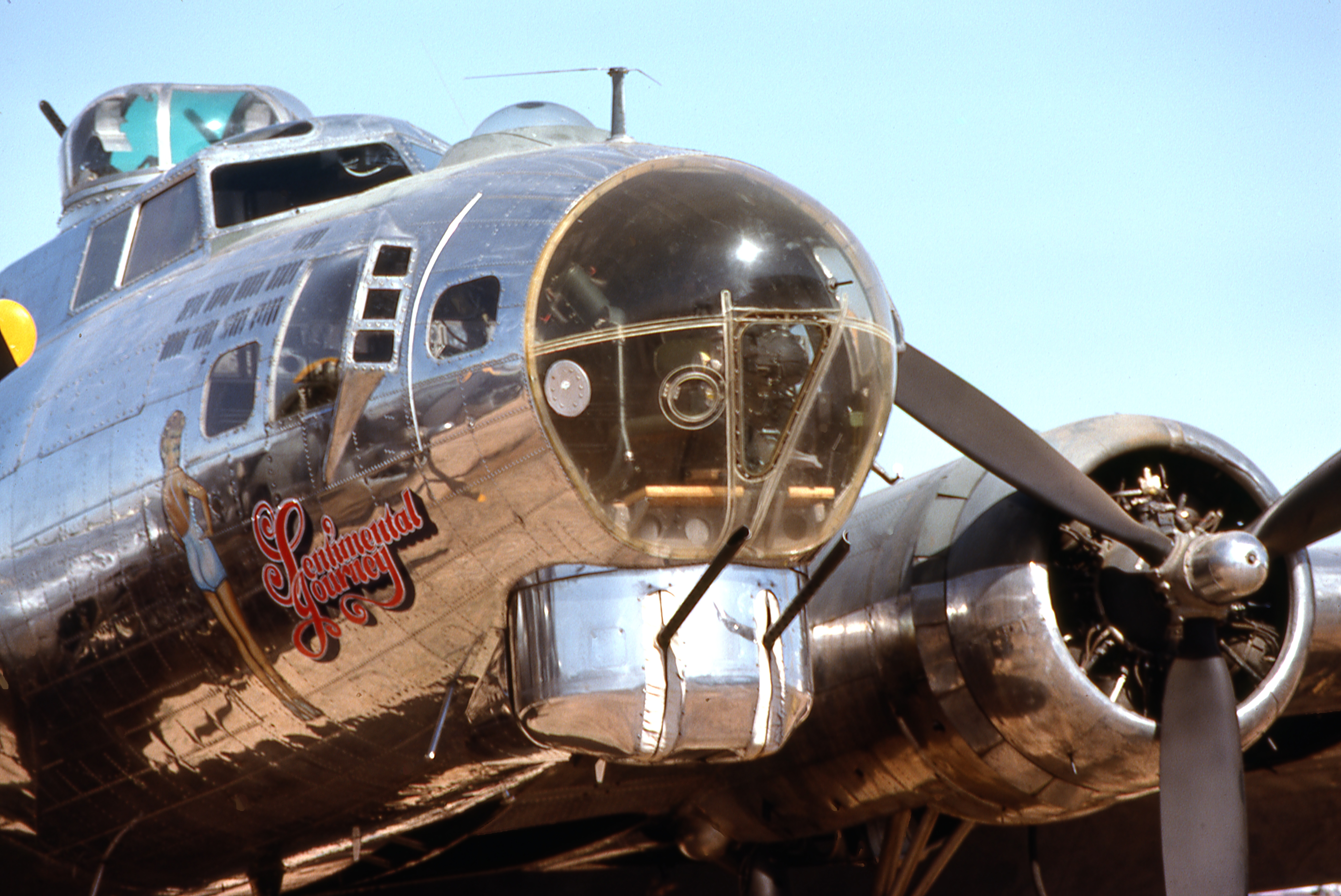
Nose gunner/bombardier position, B-17G; at Falcon Field, Mesa, Maricopa County, Arizona, 1984

Over the years, Sentimental Journey has performed across North America, as one of the most recognizable examples of the type, keeping the legacy of the B-17 intact.

In 1979, Sentimental Journey appeared in a scene in the Steven Spielberg film, 1941. In 1991, Sentimental Journey was used in a "Don't Mess with Texas" ad campaign that later won the best ad in the US over 25 years in 2011.
