= Jason Stanford (consultant) =

American author, writer

- Born: Washington, D.C.
- Education: Lewis & Clark College
- Occupations: Author; writer
- Political party: Democratic

Jason Stanford is an American author and writer. He was the communications director for Austin mayor Steve Adler. Previously, he was a Democratic strategist, commentator and author based in Washington, D.C. He is a syndicated columnist with Cagle Cartoons and also a regular contributor to the Austin American-Statesman.

Stanford co-authored Adios Mofo: Why Rick Perry Will Make America Miss George W. Bush in 2011 with James Moore. He has also written for Texas Monthly and the Texas Tribune.

Stanford is the founder of Stanford Caskey, a political research and crisis communications firm based in Austin, Texas and Chicago, Illinois.

== Career ==
Stanford attended Lewis & Clark College, where he received a bachelor of arts degree in Russian in 1992. He studied Russian because he wanted to become a spy. During his final semester at Lewis & Clark, he studied at Moscow State Pedagogical University. Stanford worked at the Moscow Guardian following his graduation and later at the Los Angeles Times Moscow bureau, where he worked as an investigative reporter under the byline J. Andrew Stanford. While at the Times, Stanford helped uncover the diversion of American funds from privatization efforts to then-Russian president Boris Yeltsin's political party. He also worked briefly as a model for Ziegenbock beer.

Stanford became involved in politics following his introduction to members of Ann Richards' 1994 Texas gubernatorial campaign staff by his editor at the Moscow Guardian, Billy Rogers, who was formerly a Texas-based Democratic operative. Stanford moved to Texas to work on Ann Richards' campaign, where he was a researcher and deputy press secretary.

In 1997, following his work on the Richards campaign, Stanford founded Stanford & Ryan Research (now known as Stanford Caskey) with the late Tom Ryan. Ryan left the company in 1999 and it became Stanford Research.

Stanford is credited with helping then-Democratic Oklahoma state Senator Brad Henry defeat Steve Largent in the 2002 Oklahoma gubernatorial election. Stanford later served as campaign manager for Chris Bell's 2006 Texas gubernatorial campaign.

In 2013, Stanford Campaigns merged with William Caskey's 3rd Coast Research and became Stanford Caskey. Stanford began writing a weekly column for The Quorum Report, a newsletter about Texas politics, in May 2014.

Jason appeared in All About Ann, an HBO documentary about the life of former Texas Governor Ann Richards, as well as in Along Came Kinky, a film that documented Kinky Friedman's campaign during that gubernatorial election.

== Publications ==
- Adios Mofo: Why Rick Perry Will Make America Miss George W. Bush (2011)
- Rick Perry Emerges as GOP's Voice of Reason (2015)
- Odds are Congress won't nix Iran Deal (2015)
- Galaxy Quest (2015)
- Senate threatens historic deal with Iran (2015)
- Pearson contract loss marks end of an error (2015)
- The Governor in the Tin Foil Hat (2015)
- Islamic attacks and the First Amendment (2015)
- Why does US ignore domestic terrorists? (2015)
- Mute the Messenger: When Dr. Walter Stroup showed that Texas’ standardized testing regime is flawed, the testing company struck back (2014)
- The Torture Report Isn't Just On Bush—It's On All Of Us (2014)
- The Nuclear Arsenal We Don't Need (2014)
- Conservative Group Tries To Revive Barry Goldwater With 'Daisy 2' (2014)
- Nobody Died and Made Rick Perry King (2014)
- Rich Lowry's 'Callow' Attack Is, Well, Juvenile (2014)
- No, Obama Isn't Our New Chamberlain (2014)
- Thank God For Dick Cheney (Really) (2014)
- Honey, I Want to Move to Mars (2014)
- Blue Skies Smiling At Me (2014)
- Abortion a winning issue for Davis (2013)
- The One That Got Away (2013)
- Wendy Davis’ path to the governor's mansion (2013)
- Ted Cruz's secret past? Stimulus funds and teacher payouts (2013)
- Texas school conspiracy reaches state legislature (2013)
- Ted Cruz's craziness is the unfunny, dangerous kind (2013)
- How the Texas GOP fuels anti-government paranoia (2015)
- Accentuate the Negative (2006)
- "Balancing Discretion and Glasnost." in Campaigns & Elections (Strategy & Tactics) (2001)
- Forget the Alamo: The Rise and Fall of an American Myth (2021, with Bryan Burrough and Chris Tomlinson) ISBN 9781984880093

== Personal life ==
Stanford is married to Sonia Van Meter.

== See also ==
- Opposition research
- Political consulting
- Crisis communication
