= USS Texas (SSN-775) =

US Navy Virginia-class submarine

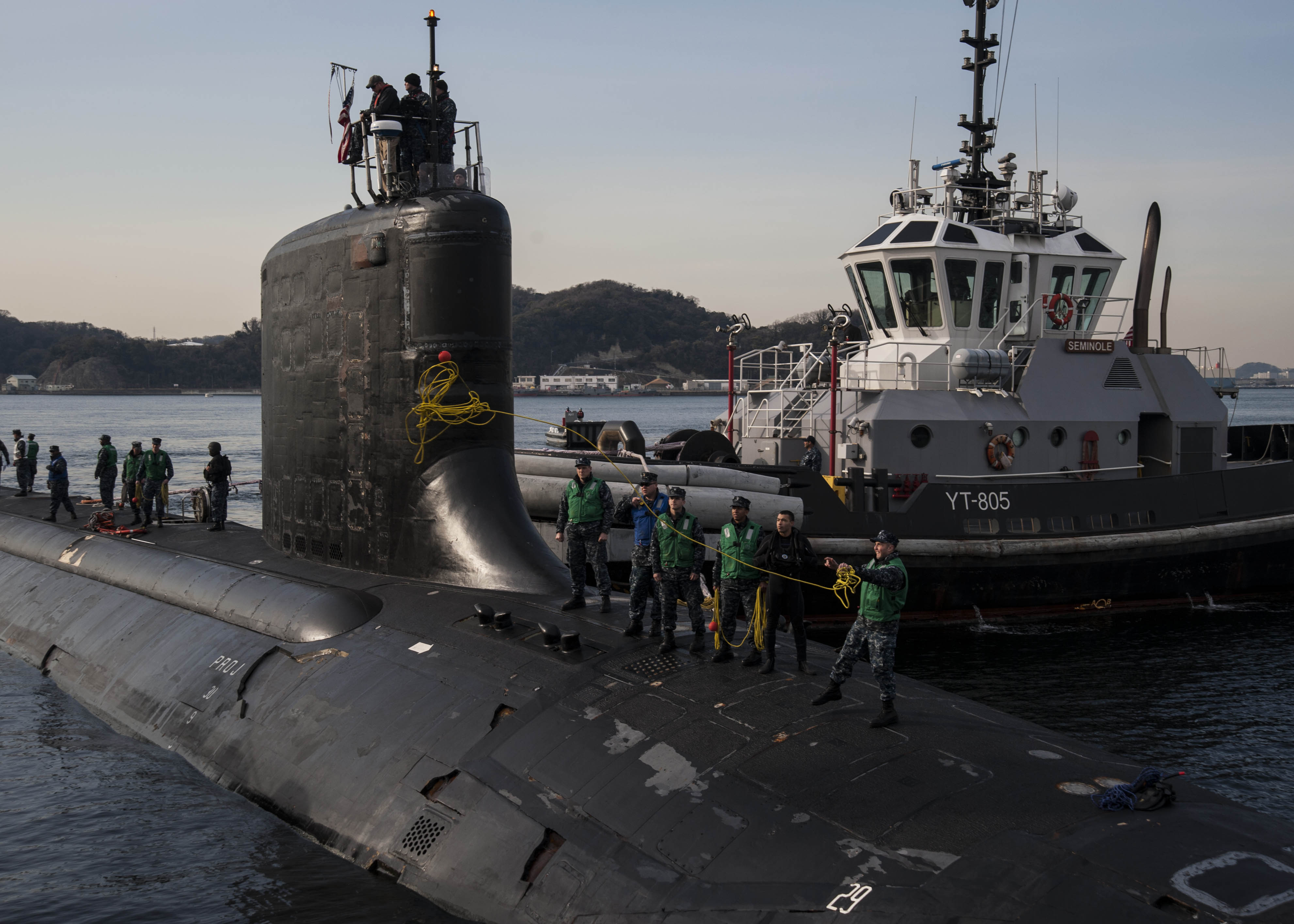
- USS Texas in Yokosuka, Japan, in February 2015

History

United States
- Name: USS Texas
- Namesake: State of Texas
- Awarded: 30 September 1999
- Builder: General Dynamics Electric Boat
- Laid down: 12 July 2002
- Sponsored by: Laura Bush
- Christened: 31 July 2004
- Launched: 9 April 2005
- Commissioned: 9 September 2006
- Home port: Groton, Connecticut, U.S.
- Motto: "Don't Mess with Texas!"
- Status: in active service
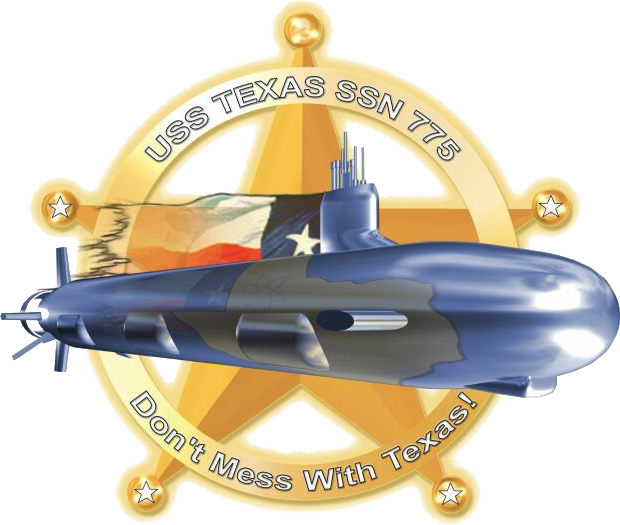
- Badge

General characteristics
- Class & type: Virginia-class submarine
- Displacement: 7,900 tonnes (7,800 long tons)
- Length: 114.9 m (377 ft)
- Beam: 10.3 m (34 ft)
- Propulsion: 1 × S9G PWR nuclear reactor 280,000 shp (210 MW), HEU 93%; 2 × steam turbines 40,000 shp (30 MW); 1 × single shaft pump-jet propulsor; 1 × secondary propulsion motor
- Speed: exceeds 25 kn (29 mph; 46 km/h)
- Range: Measured in terms of time (life-of-the-ship; approx. 33 years)
- Complement: 134 (14 officers, 120 enlisted)
- Armament: 12 × VLS (BGM-109 Tomahawk cruise missile); 4 × 533 mm torpedo tubes (Mk-48 torpedo)

USS Texas (hull number SSN-775) is a Virginia-class submarine, and the fourth warship of the United States Navy to be named after the US state of Texas. Texas was commissioned as a US Navy warship in Galveston, Texas, on 9 September 2006.

== Construction ==
The contract to build her was awarded to the Northrop Grumman Newport News shipyard (then called Newport News Shipbuilding & Drydock Co.) on 30 September 1998 and her keel was laid down on 12 July 2002. She was christened on 31 July 2004 by Laura Bush, First Lady of the United States. She was launched into the James River on 9 April 2005.

Texas arrived at Galveston Bay on 4 September 2006 and was escorted into the harbor by Elissa. With a crowd of 10,000 in attendance, Texas was commissioned in Galveston and joined the US Atlantic Fleet on 9 September 2006.

== Operational history ==
The boat departed New London Naval Submarine Base at Groton for Pearl Harbor on 16 September 2009. On her way to Pearl Harbor, Texas traveled to the Arctic Ocean and surfaced near the North Pole's ice pack. Texas arrived at her new home port on 23 November 2009.

The submarine departed Pearl Harbor for her first three-month operational patrol on 27 October 2010. The location of her first deployment was not disclosed by the Navy. In May 2012, Texas underwent a scheduled 20-month-long overhaul at Pearl Harbor Naval Shipyard in Hawaii.

Texas arrived at Portsmouth Naval Shipyard in Kittery, Maine, in September 2020 for repairs and modernization; the work concluded with successful sea trials in December 2024.

== Ship's crest ==
"In the forefront is a full view of Texas, ready to go forth and take the fight to the enemy. Emblazoned on her hull is the shape of the state of Texas, denoting the outstanding patriotism and leadership the citizens of Texas have contributed to the American nation. Located within the state outline is a symbol of the atom, representing the warfighting capability and endurance afforded Texas by nuclear power.

Texas is backed by the traditional badge of the Texas Rangers. This identifies the singularity of purpose between the men and women who enforce Texas law and the sailors. The four white stars represent the four American warships to bear the name of the state of Texas. "Don't Mess with Texas" is a well known state slogan and a warning for those who attempt to prevent Texas from carrying out her mission. The battle scarred Lone Star flag flying behind Texas represents the gallant heroism of those who fought and died at the Alamo to ensure the future of Texas, and it also represents the perseverance with which Texas and her crew will endure through all missions that are put before her."

== In popular culture ==
- The commissioning of Texas is depicted in Season 2, Episode 4 of the Discovery Channel television series, FutureWeapons.

== Gallery ==
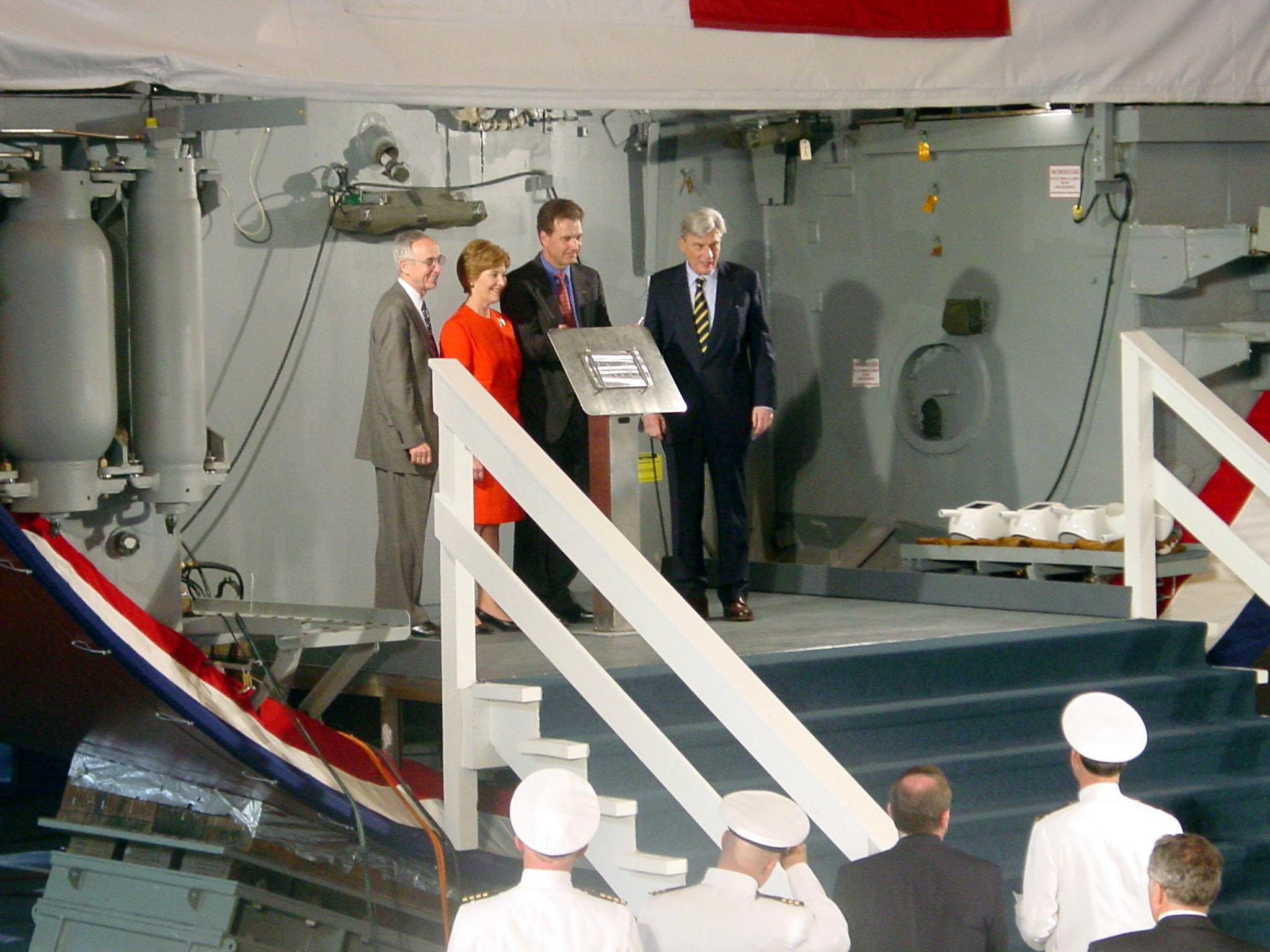
SSN-775's keel being laid in July 2002

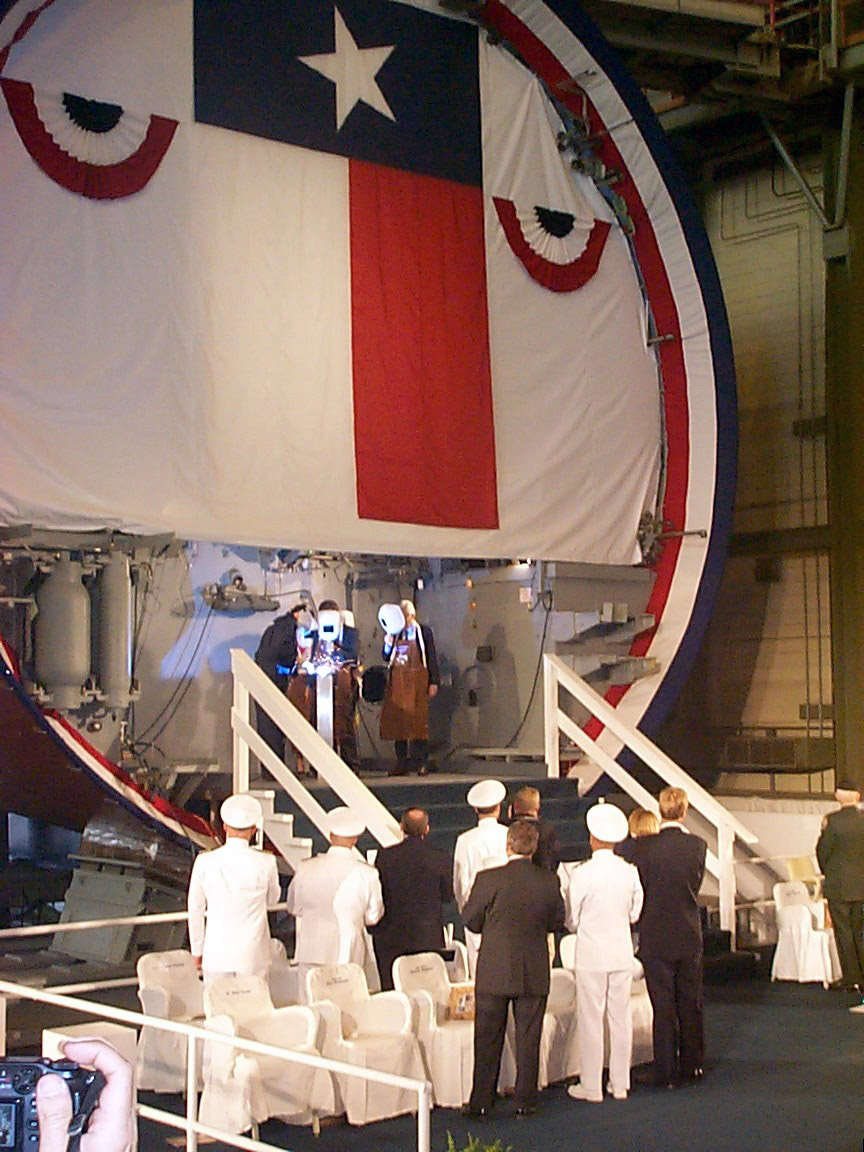
SSN-775's keel being laid in July 2002

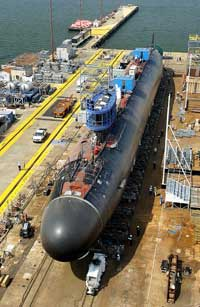
Texas under construction

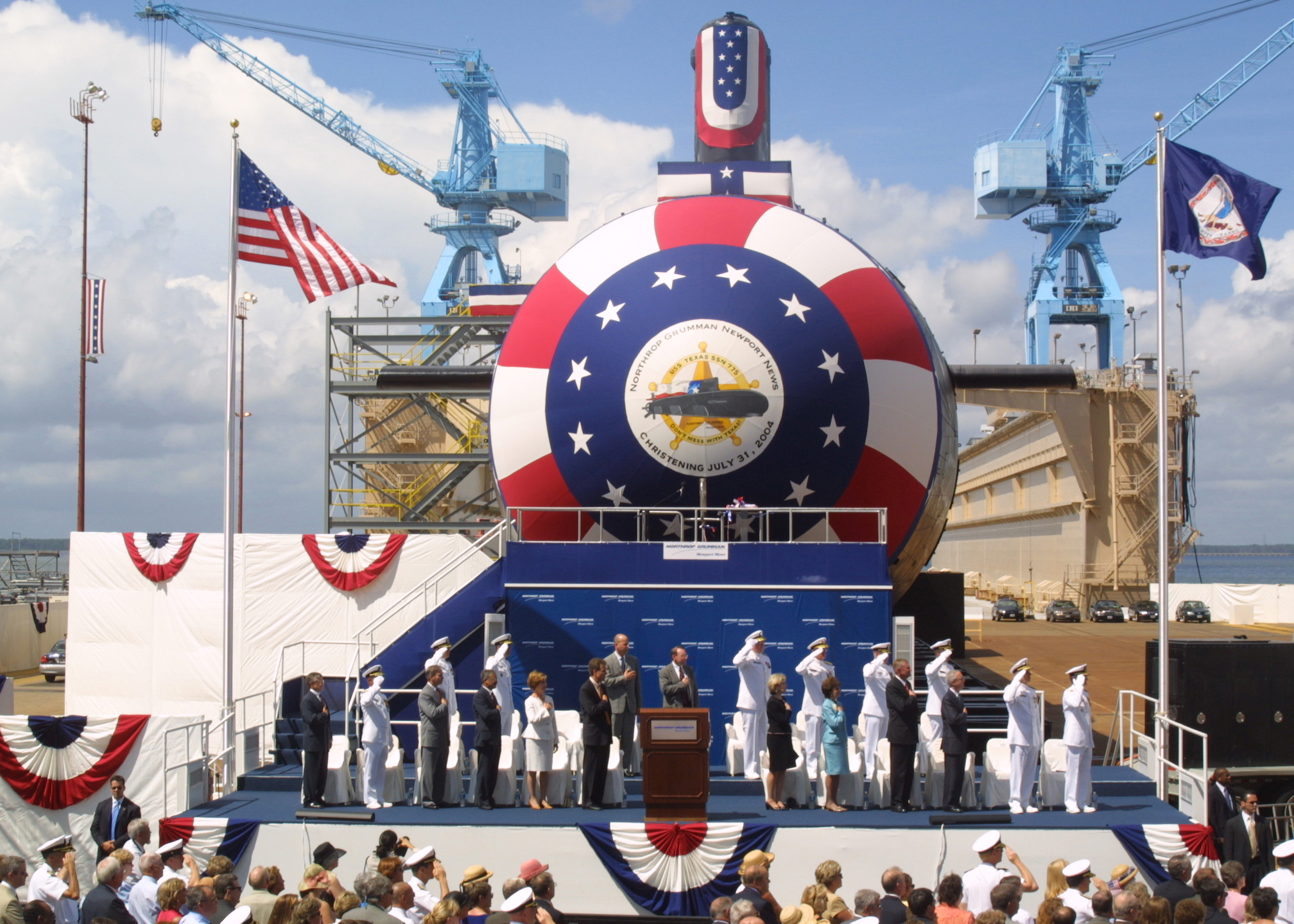
The launching of USS Texas in July 2004
