= Cervejas de Moçambique =

Brewery group from Mozambique

Cervejas de Moçambique S.A.R.L.
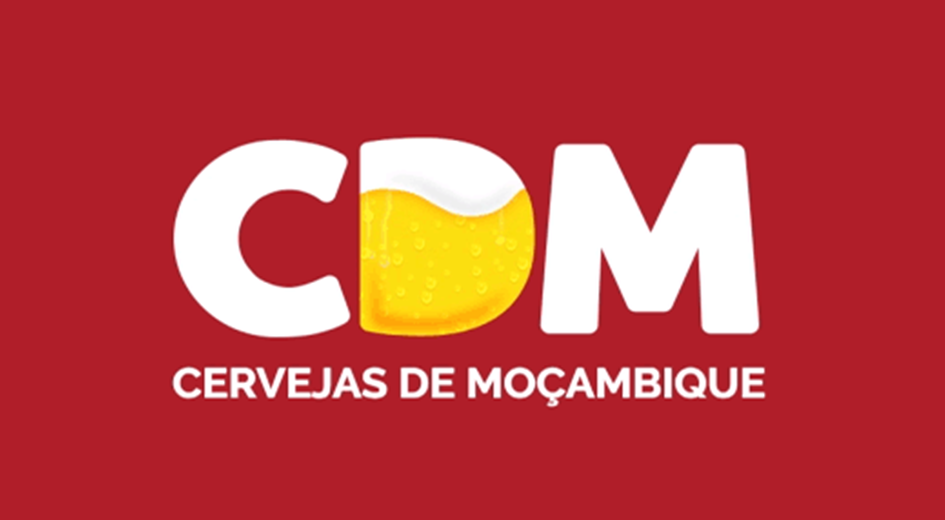
- Industry: Beverage
- Founded: 1995; 30 years ago
- Headquarters: Maputo, Mozambique
- Key people: Tomaz Salomão (Chairman)
- Revenue: ▲MZN 20,78 billions (2021)
- Net income: ▲MZN 1,49 billions (2021)
- Number of employees: 1,141(2019); 1,009(2018); 977(2017)
- Parent: AB InBev
- Website: https://cdm.co.mz/

Cervejas de Moçambique (CDM) is a Mozambican beer brewing group, subsidiary of Anheuser-Busch InBev, that holds all the major Mozambican beer brands and controls approximately 94% of the Mozambican beer market.

It brews over 2 million hectoliters of beer annually at its four production sites in Maputo (two), Beira, and Nampula.

== History ==
The company was founded in 1995, after the end of the People's Republic of Mozambique (1990) and the subsequent transformation to a market economy. The South African-US group SABMiller took over 49.1% and the management of the company. The company was formed from the 2M brewery, founded in Maputo in 1962 and nationalized after independence in 1975, and the Manica brewery from Beira, founded in 1959 and also nationalized after 1975.

In addition, in 2001 CDM took over the traditional Laurentina, which had been Mozambique's first brewery in 1932 and remained the market leader for a long time until its decline after 1975. As a result, CDM now owns all the well-known Mozambican beer brands. This was followed by modernizations to the facilities in Maputo and the construction of a new modern brewery in Nampula, in the north of the country, by the German company Krones in 2009.

In 2012, CDM introduced Impala beer, the world's first industrially produced beer made from cassava. This was intended to support the country's agriculture and reduce import dependency, as well as bringing a cheaper beer to the market. For production in Nampula, purchases are primarily made from regional smallholders, who until then had faced production surpluses that could not be sold. In 2015, about 7,500 family farms in the region supplied cassava to Impala.

In 2013, CDM expanded its Beira factory and increased Manica production from 35 to 41 hectoliters.

In October 2016, Anheuser-Busch InBev (AB InBev) merged with SABMiller Plc, thus indirectly becoming the main shareholder of CDM, with 51,1% of the shares, then in April 2020, was inaugurated the Marracuene Brewery in the Marracuene district the largest and most modern brewery in the country and in Africa.

== Beers ==
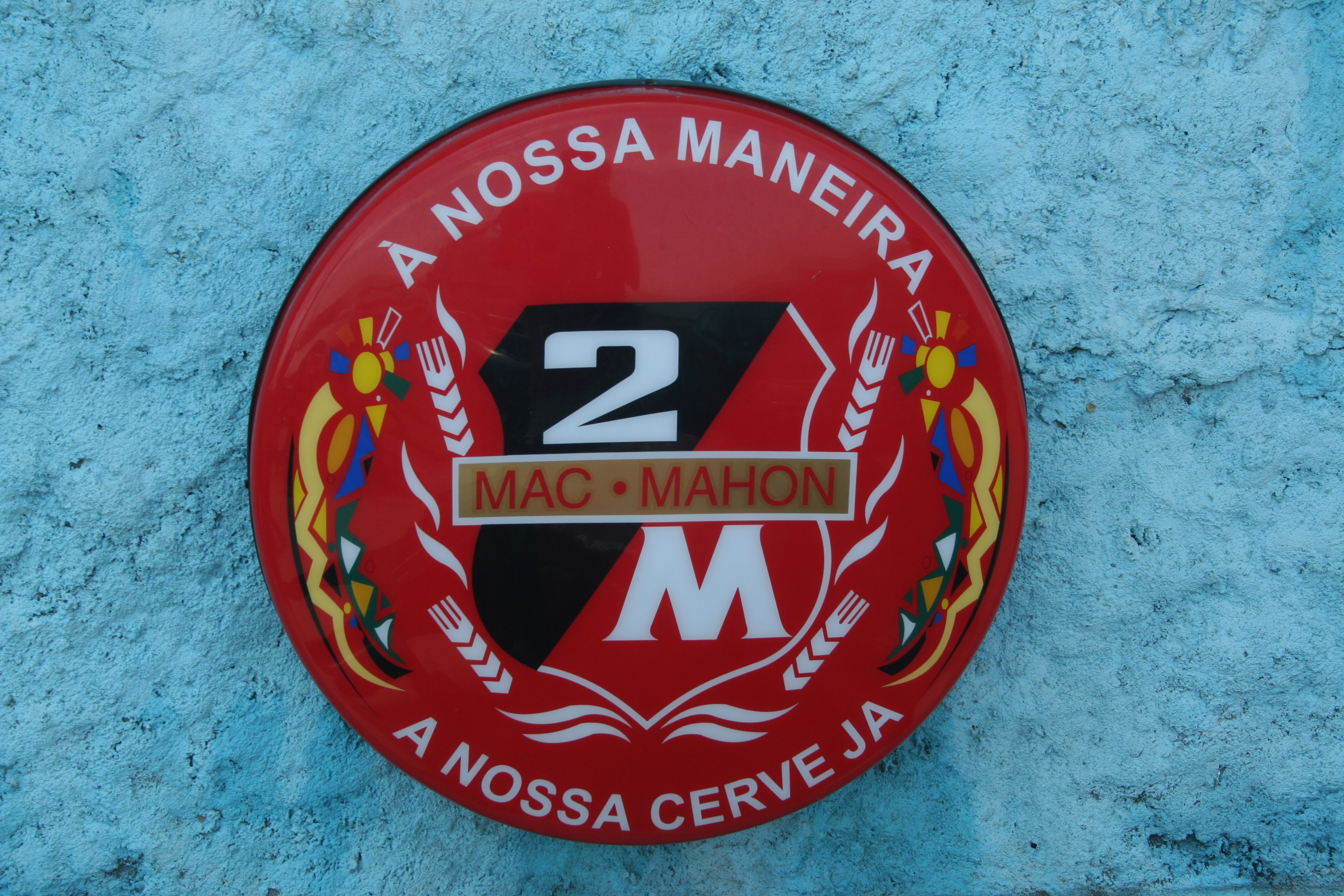
Logo of the most famous beer brand of the brewery, 2M.

The following Mozambican brands belong to CDM:

- 2M
- Laurentina
  - Laurentina Clara
  - Laurentina Preta
  - Laurentina Premium
- Manica
- Impala (first cassava beer in the world)
- Raiz (discontinued)
- Dourada

it brews beers from the AB InBev portfolio, in particular:

- Castle Lite
- Chibuku

In addition, it distributes global and local brands from the AB InBev portfolio:

- Stella Artois
- Budweiser
- Flying Fish
- Corona

== Further information ==
CDM maintains a wine trade and distributes a range of spirits.
