= Don't Mess with Texas =

Anti-littering slogan in Texas

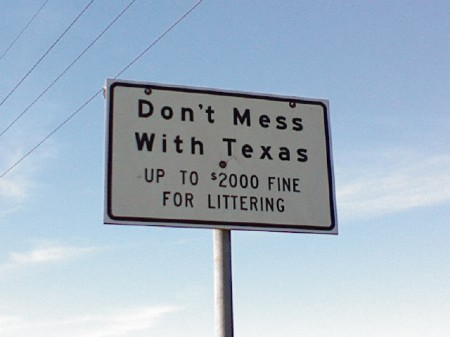
Sign used on Texas highways

"Don't Mess with Texas" is a slogan for a campaign aimed at reducing littering on Texas roadways by the Texas Department of Transportation (TxDOT). The phrase "Don't Mess with Texas" is prominently shown on road signs on major highways, television, radio and in print advertisements. The campaign is credited with reducing litter on Texas highways roughly 72% between 1987 and 1990. The campaign's target market was 18- to 35-year-old males, which was statistically shown to be the most likely to litter. While the slogan was not originally intended to become a statewide cultural phenomenon, it eventually did become one.

Beyond its immediate role in reducing litter, the slogan has been popularly appropriated by Texans. The phrase has become "an identity statement, a declaration of Texas swagger" and Texas pride. Though the origin of the slogan is not well known outside of Texas, it appears on countless items of tourist souvenirs. Since the phrase is a federally registered trademark, the department has tried at times to enforce its trademark rights with cease and desist letters, but has had very limited success. The slogan is the title of the book, Don’t Mess With Texas: The Story Behind the Legend.

"Don't Mess with Texas" has been awarded a plaque on the Madison Avenue Walk of Fame and a place in the Advertising Hall of Fame, a distinction given to only two slogans annually.

"Don't Mess with Texas" is also the official motto of the Virginia-class submarine USS Texas.

In 2011 the result of a public vote for the best "Don't Mess with Texas" ad over the last 25 years was revealed, the winner was one created by the Commemorative Air Force (then called the Confederate Air Force). The ad involved the CAF's Boeing B-17 "Sentimental Journey" pursuing and retaliating against a truck from which trash was thrown.

== History ==
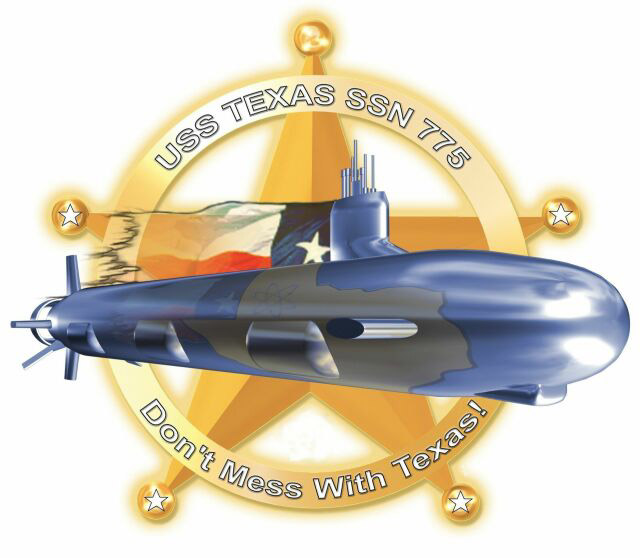
The crest for the submarine USS Texas. The phrase "Don't Mess with Texas!" can be seen on the lower half of the crest.

In 1985 the TxDOT asked Mike Blair and Tim McClure of GSD&M to create a slogan for an anti-littering campaign. At the time the state of Texas spent about $20 million annually to clean litter from highways. McClure said that "bubbas in pickup trucks" who regularly littered beer cans and other items out of vehicle windows and ordinary Texans who believed that littering was a "God-given right" were targets of the advertising campaign. McClure said that he created the slogan when he saw garbage while walking near his house. Emanuella Grinberg of CNN said that McClure had "an eleventh hour 'aha' moment" when, after looking at the trash, he recalled his mother telling him that his room was messy. "McClure said 'It occurred to me that the only time I'd heard the word litter was in reference to dogs. Mess seemed like it would resonate better.'" McClure's slogan is believed to be the first written use of "Don't mess with Texas", although there are earlier uses of "Don't mess with..." such as the 1966 Marvelette's song "Don't Mess with Bill".

The creators initially had difficulty convincing TxDOT to adopt the slogan. The creators said that the administrators were "buzz-cutted, conservative kind of characters." The creators joked that the board members' average age was 107. McClure recalled that "The crowd was sprinkled with 'Keep America Beautiful' and 'Keep Texas Beautiful' folks, and our audience is 18-to-24 young males." McClure added that "The 'Keep Texas Beautiful' lady said, 'Can we at least say please?' I said, 'No ma'am, you cannot use the line if you put please in front of it.' If not for the vision of Don Clark, the then Director of Travel and Information Division of the Texas Highway Department, the slogan would have never been used. Clark went ahead with the slogan without the support of the TxDOT administrators. After the first televised ad with Stevie Ray Vaughan aired, Clark jokes that he went to work the next day and was unsure if he would be fired. TxDOT decided to ask the public for comment and there was a resounding positive result."

The campaign began in 1985 with a series of bumper stickers. In 1986 the slogan premiered its first television advertisement, featuring Stevie Ray Vaughan, at the 50th Annual Cotton Bowl Classic on January 1, 1986, singing the "Eyes of Texas" with the line "Don't Mess with Texas" added at the end of the song. Since then, numerous musicians, athletes, celebrities and other famous Texans have appeared in "Don't Mess with Texas" radio and television public service announcements, including:

- Lance Armstrong (2007)
- Asleep at the Wheel
- Erykah Badu (2007)
- Marcia Ball (1991)
- Black Pumas (2021)
- Earl Campbell (2016)
- Joe "King" Carrasco
- Chamillionaire (2007)
- Johnny Dee and the Rocket 88's (1986)
- Joe Ely (1991)
- The Fabulous Thunderbirds (1986)
- Morgan Fairchild
- Las Fenix (2018)
- George Foreman (1991)
- Ernest Givins (1989)
- Ethan Hawke (2023)
- "Little Joe" Hernandez (1989)
- Tish Hinojosa
- Jack Ingram (2014)
- Joe Jonas (2022)
- "Too Tall" Jones (1987)
- Los Lonely Boys (2007)
- Jennifer Love Hewitt (2007)
- Whitney K. Lane (2019)
- Lyle Lovett (1990)
- Billy Mays
- Matthew McConaughey (2000, 2007, 2020)
- Warren Moon (1989)
- Ian Moore (1995)
- Willie Nelson (1989)
- Chuck Norris (2007)
- Papi Chulo (2019)
- Andy Pettitte
- LeAnn Rimes (1998)
- Randy Rogers Band (2018)
- Mike Scott (1986)
- Austin Wayne Self (2016)
- Shamu & the Texas Tuxedos
- George Strait (2010, 2020)
- Texas Tornados (1990)
- Stevie Ray Vaughan (1985)
- Jerry Jeff Walker (1988)
- Randy White (1987)
- Mike Williams (1987)
- Owen Wilson (2007)

In a 12-year period with the agency GSD&M, over 26 television spots appeared.

Due to the budget cuts of the Great Recession, TxDOT has expanded the use of the licence to sell "Don't Mess With Texas" related souvenirs in "state run rest areas, and travel information centers" in order to fill in its budget gaps. Until 2012, the organization was forbidden to do so due to federal regulations.

After learning that 96% of Texans had heard the phrase "Don't mess with Texas" but only 61% of Texans knew the slogan meant don't litter, TxDOT began brainstorming new campaign ideas to re-emphasize the original meaning of the campaign. In 2009, TxDOT launched a new campaign including new TV and radio featuring George Strait telling Texans that "Don't mess with Texas means don't litter". This slogan is still used in all of the campaigns and radio ads.

As of 2023, the San Antonio, Texas-based advertising agency, GDC Marketing & Ideation manages the "Don't mess with Texas" brand.

== Unauthorized use of the trademark ==
Since 2000, TxDOT has contacted over 100 companies and organizations with cease and desist letters regarding the unauthorized use of the trademark phrase. State officials claim that protecting the trademark helps the state preserve the slogan's anti-littering message.

- A Texas-based company in Alabama used the slogan for a billboard campaign in February 2010.
- The University of Texas at Austin agreed to stop selling T-shirts with the slogan after being contacted by the Texas Department of Transportation.
- The department attempted to block the Texas Abortion and Reproductive Rights Action League from the sale of "Don't Mess With Texas Women" T-shirts.
- The author Christie Craig published a romance novel originally titled Don't Mess with Texas. After legal actions, the title was changed to Only in Texas.
- Malacca State Government in Malaysia used the slogan with the same design and same phrase but changed it to "Don't Mess With Melaka" in 2014, but its Chief Minister claimed the copycat claim was baseless.

== References in popular culture ==
- On July 19, 1986, four members of the New York Mets baseball club, in Houston for a series versus the Astros, were arrested at a Houston nightclub. Homemade signs held up in the Astrodome by fans at the following night's game read "Don't Mets With Texas."
- Don't Mess wit Texas is the debut studio album by American rapper Lil' Keke from Houston, Texas. It was released on June 17, 1997.
- Then-presidential candidate George W. Bush used the phrase in his acceptance speech at the 2000 Republican National Convention.
- After the Texas Rangers Major League Baseball club lost the 2010 World Series to the San Francisco Giants, Gary Thomas, President and executive director of Dallas Area Rapid Transit (DART) lost his bet and had to fly to the San Francisco Bay Area and serenade patrons using the Bay Area Rapid Transit (BART). Thomas was quoted as saying, "You know there's a saying that goes, 'Don't mess with Texas. Well DART, don't mess with BART."
- In the Stephen King novel 11/22/63, the time-travelling main character, Jake Epping, encounters a shop in a North Dallas neighborhood selling Texas state flags emblazoned with "DON'T MESS WITH TEXAS" in September 1960, twenty years before McClure created the slogan. McClure sent a copy of his book to King's agent to educate him about the error, but he has said that he is happy to have people think the slogan is much older than it really is. McClure has no desire to see a correction made to the novel regarding this anachronism.

== See also ==
- Litter in the United States
