= Laurentina =

Beer brand

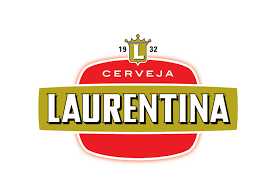
- Type: Lager, Black beer
- Manufacturer: CDM
- Origin: Mozambique
- Introduced: 1932; 94 years ago (in Maputo, Mozambique)
- Flavour: 3: Laurentina Preta (Black beer); Laurentina Clara (Lager); Laurentina Premium
- Website: cdm.co.mz

Laurentina is the first beer brand and former brewery from Mozambique. It was founded in 1932 and since 2002 has been a brand of the Mozambican brewing group Cervejas de Moçambique, itself an Anheuser-Busch InBev subsidiary. Laurentina has a share of around 20% of the Mozambique beer market.

== History ==
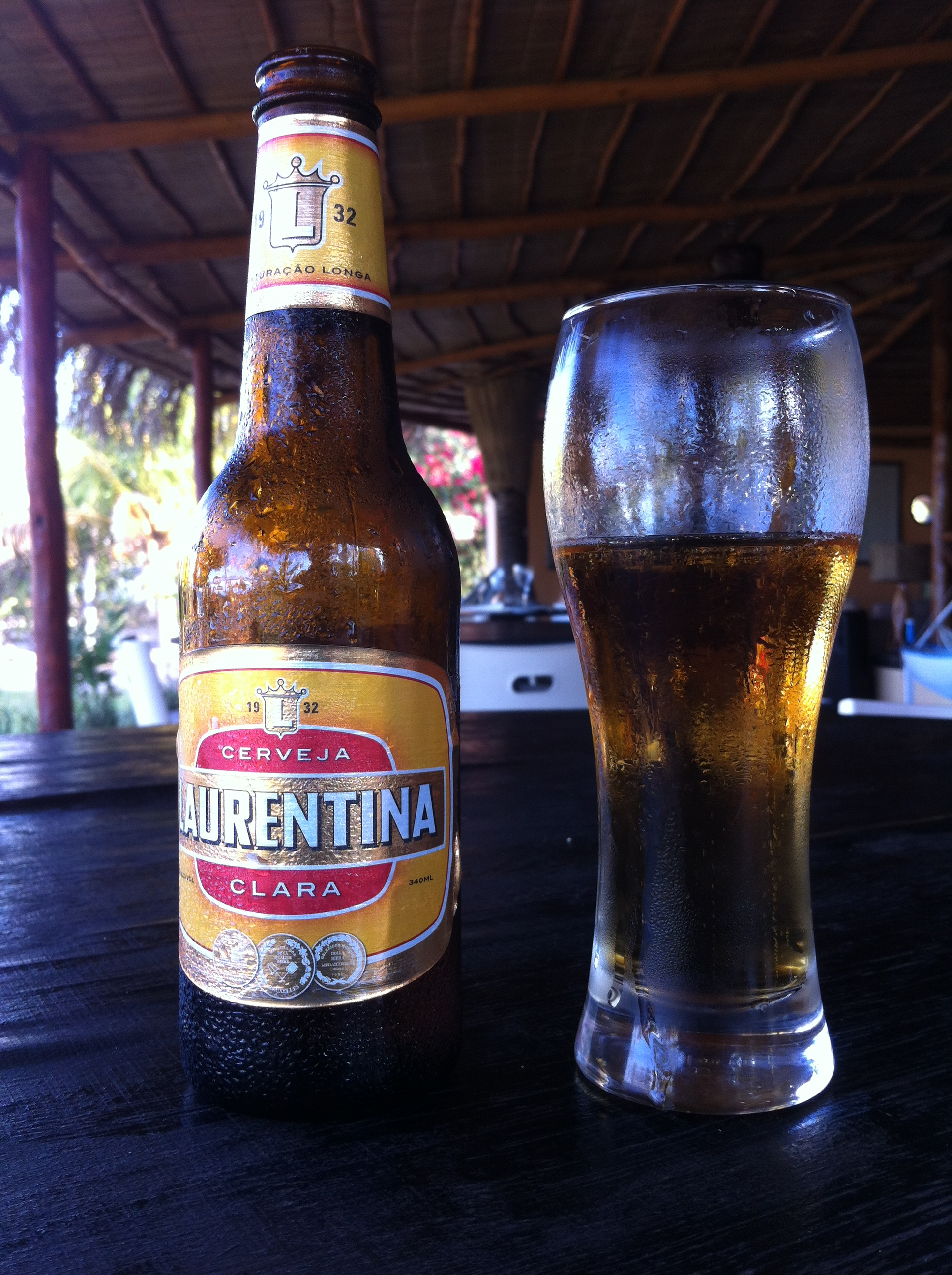
A bottle of light Laurentina (Clara), enjoyed near the beach of Vilankulo.

In the then Portuguese colony of Mozambique, the Greek immigrant Cretikos founded the Victoria Ice and Water Factory in 1916 as the first ice and mineral water factory in Mozambique. He subsequently expanded production to include soft drinks and also aimed to produce the first Mozambican beer. To this end, he traveled to Germany and hired a master brewer. According to his recipe, the production of the new beer began in 1932, which Cretikos named Laurentina, after the popular name for the inhabitants of his city, Lourenço Marques (now Maputo) - " laurentinos". The brewery later became the Fábrica de Cerveja Reunidas.

Laurentina became the best-selling beer in Mozambique and also sold in neighboring South Africa. It did not face serious domestic competition until 1962, when it was joined by the beer brand 2M, today the undisputed market leader. Manica from Beira, which had already been founded in 1959, was only regionally significant and had hardly any presence in the capital.

After Mozambique's independence in 1975, Laurentina sales declined extremely. The reason was the country's economic situation: in 1977, the Mozambican Civil War had broken out, and the planned economic restructuring was also not making any progress. Some important ingredients were now almost impossible to obtain. Laurentina beer, however, was produced continuously, despite the only slowly decreasing difficulties, even if the at times very low production could not nearly meet the demand of the capital alone.

After the end of the People's Republic of Mozambique in 1990 and the subsequent market-economy restructuring of the economy, Laurentina was then privatized in 1995 and sold to the French BGI/Groupe Castel.

In 2002, Castel sold Laurentina to Cervejas de Moçambique (CDM). The latter is 49.1% owned by the SABMiller Group (now AB InBev), which also manages the company. CDM also owns the other Mozambican beer brands, such as the market leader 2M, the likewise traditional Manica beer, and Impala, the world's first industrially produced beer made from cassava, which was launched in 2012.

== International presence ==
After its foundation in 1932, Laurentina also sold part of its production to nearby South Africa, for which Mozambique was a popular vacation destination, especially from the 1920s to the mid-1970s. Since 2006, CDM began to export Laurentina again in a targeted manner. Alongside South Africa, Great Britain is the most important target country. However, exports represent only a small part of sales so far.

Laurentina is also available in some supermarkets in Portugal, but with no connection to Mozambique, and no significant market presence. A Portuguese who left Mozambique during the colonial war in Mozambique re-registered the brand in Germany after the Carnation Revolution and has since been producing Laurentina beer for Portugal.

== Polemic around advertising campaign 2011 ==
An advertising campaign for the dark beer Laurentina Preta caused a stir in 2011. A stylized black woman's body was shown with a label of the beer and accompanied by an ambiguous slogan, which on the one hand was aimed at the improved dark beer (Cerveja preta - "black beer"), but on the other hand could be interpreted as an allusion to the availability of a black woman reduced to a sex object (original: Esta preta foi de boa para melhor - Agora com uma garrafa mais sexy., English roughly: "This black one is now available even better - Now with an even more seductive bottle. ").

After public protest and increasing international attention, in the Portuguese-speaking community and among international visitors to the 2011 African Games in Maputo, the CDM withdrew its advertising.

== Varieties ==
- Laurentina Clara (Lager)
- Laurentina Preta (Black beer)
- Laurentina Premivelo

== Awards ==
Laurentina brands have been awarded 5 medals over the years:

- In 2008, Laurentina Preta won a Gold medal at the Monde Selection
- In 2009, Laurentina Premium won a Grand Gold medal at Monde Selection, positioning Mozambique as a high quality beer producer.
- In 2013, Laurentina Preta won two gold stars at the Superior Taste Awards in 2013.
- In 2013 and 2015 Laurentina Preta achieved first place for Best Beer from Africa at African Beer Awards.
