= Oranjeboom Brewery =

Dutch brewery

Oranjeboom
- Type: Pilsner
- Manufacturer: United Dutch Breweries BV
- Origin: Netherlands
- Introduced: 1671
- Alcohol by volume: Lager 3.9% ABV; Premium Pilsner 5% ABV; Extra Strong 8.5% ABV; Super Strong 12.0% ABV; Ultra Strong 14.0% ABV; Mega Strong 16.0% ABV; Extreme Strong 18.0% ABV; Supreme Strong 20.0% ABV

The Oranjeboom Brewery (Dutch pronunciation: [oːˈrɑɲəˌboːm]) was founded in Rotterdam in 1671. The brewery there closed in 1990, with production shifted to Breda. That brewery was sold to Interbrew in 1995 and was closed in 2004 by InBev, Interbrew's successor. Production of the brand Oranjeboom was moved to the Dommelsch brewery. In October 2013, Oranjeboom was relaunched as a "quirky" new European style lager again. The name means "orange tree" in Dutch.

== History ==
The brewery dates from 1671, and started with the merger of two Rotterdam breweries, De Dissel and van den Oranjeboom; it was originally housed on the Coolvest, in the center of town.

Late 19th-century developments in the Dutch brewing industry all involved the then-new process of brewing lager, which used a yeast with the capability of cool fermenting; this allowed for production year-round, but required significant investments in modern technology and cold storage. In 1872, the brewery was owned by Willem Baartz, who was looking to get into the lager market. Baartz approached Gerard Adriaan Heineken but instead got involved in a new venture that led to the founding of Heineken's Bierbrouwerij Maatschappij. By 1882, Oranjeboom had been sold on to the (Protestant) brewing company De Gekroonde Valk, one of the first breweries in the Netherlands to brew lager. In 1885, a brand-new brewery was opened on Oranjeboomstraat in the Feijenoord district, then a new development south of the city. The city named the street after the brewery, which, around the turn of the century, was an important employer providing over 200 jobs, and one of the largest breweries in the country. After World War II, several other breweries were bought to meet demand and stay competitive: De Wereld (Raamsdonk, 1948), Wertha (Weert, 1960), Zuidhollandse Bierbrouwerij (The Hague, 1960), Phoenix (Amersfoort, 1961), and Barbarossa (Groningen, 1964). None of these breweries remains.

In 1967, Oranjeboom was taken over by UK company Allied Breweries, which made an important acquisition in 1968 when it bought the brewery De Drie Hoefijzers in Breda, a town with a long history of beer brewing. The Breda brewery took on the name Oranjeboom. In 1973, the brand Oranjeboom was replaced by Skol, which was deemed to be a more attractive name for the European market, but it was a failure in Holland, and the brand name Oranjeboom was reintroduced in 1982. The plant in Rotterdam was closed in 1990, and in 1995, the Breda brewery was sold to Belgian beer giant Interbrew, which modernized the plant, but poor results in 2001 led to the plant's closure in 2004, (with a loss of 335 jobs), with production moved to Belgium and to the (Dutch) Dommelsch Brewery.

== Ownership ==
With the exception of the Benelux area, the tradename Oranjeboom is owned by United Dutch Breweries. It was previously owned by Allied Breweries of the UK.

== Beers ==
The Oranjeboom brewery mainly produced Oranjeboom pils and other lagers, and also Trio Stout. Oranjeboom Breweries were also the manufacturers of the popular Dutch Gold beer, which is one of the best-selling lager beers in retail around the Republic of Ireland.

The main beer produced under the brand name is Oranjeboom Premium Pilsner - a 5% ABV lager. There is also an Extra Strong 8.5% ABV version, a Super Strong 12.0% ABV version as well as lower strength and alcohol-free versions and a bokbier sold under the brand name.

=== International versions ===
- The lager was brewed in Faversham, UK under license by Shepherd Neame at a strength of 3.9%.
- Oranjeboom pilsener brewed in Germany is labeled for US sales and exported to the US.
- A high percentage Oranjeboom has been imported to the UK, in 500 ml cans at 8.5% ABV
- In New Zealand, Oranjeboom has been brewed under license by Lion Nathan since 2005.
- A variant known as "Premium Strong Beer" is brewed in France for export. It has a high alcohol content of 16% ABV and is labelled "imported mega strong".
