= Chris Tomlinson (journalist) =

American journalist and author

Chris Tomlinson at the Texas Book Festival. 2025

Chris Tomlinson is an American journalist and author. He is a business columnist for the Houston Chronicle. Before working for the Chronicle, he worked for the Associated Press for 20 years. In 2021, he was awarded columnist of the year by the Texas Association of Managing Editors.

In 1992, he graduated from the University of Texas at Austin with special honors in humanities. Tomlinson spent seven years in the U.S. Army, before becoming a journalist.

Tomlinson has reported from more than 30 countries, including Rwanda, Somalia, Afghanistan, Iraq and Congo.

During 20 years working for the Associated Press he reported on politics, wars, conflicts and natural disasters. One of his first assignments, was covering the end of apartheid in South Africa and the election of Nelson Mandela. He also covered the aftermath of the Rwandan genocide.

Several of Tomlinson books became New York Times bestsellers, including Tomlinson Hill: The Remarkable Story of Two Families who Share the Tomlinson Name-One White, One Black. During research for the book Tomlinson met descendents of slaves that his ancestors once owned.

== Books ==
- with Bryan Burrough and Jason Stanford Forget the Alamo: The Rise and Fall of an American Myth
- Tomlinson Hill: The Remarkable Story of Two Families Who Share the Tomlinson Name - One White, One Black
