= Ziegenbock =

American-made German lager beer

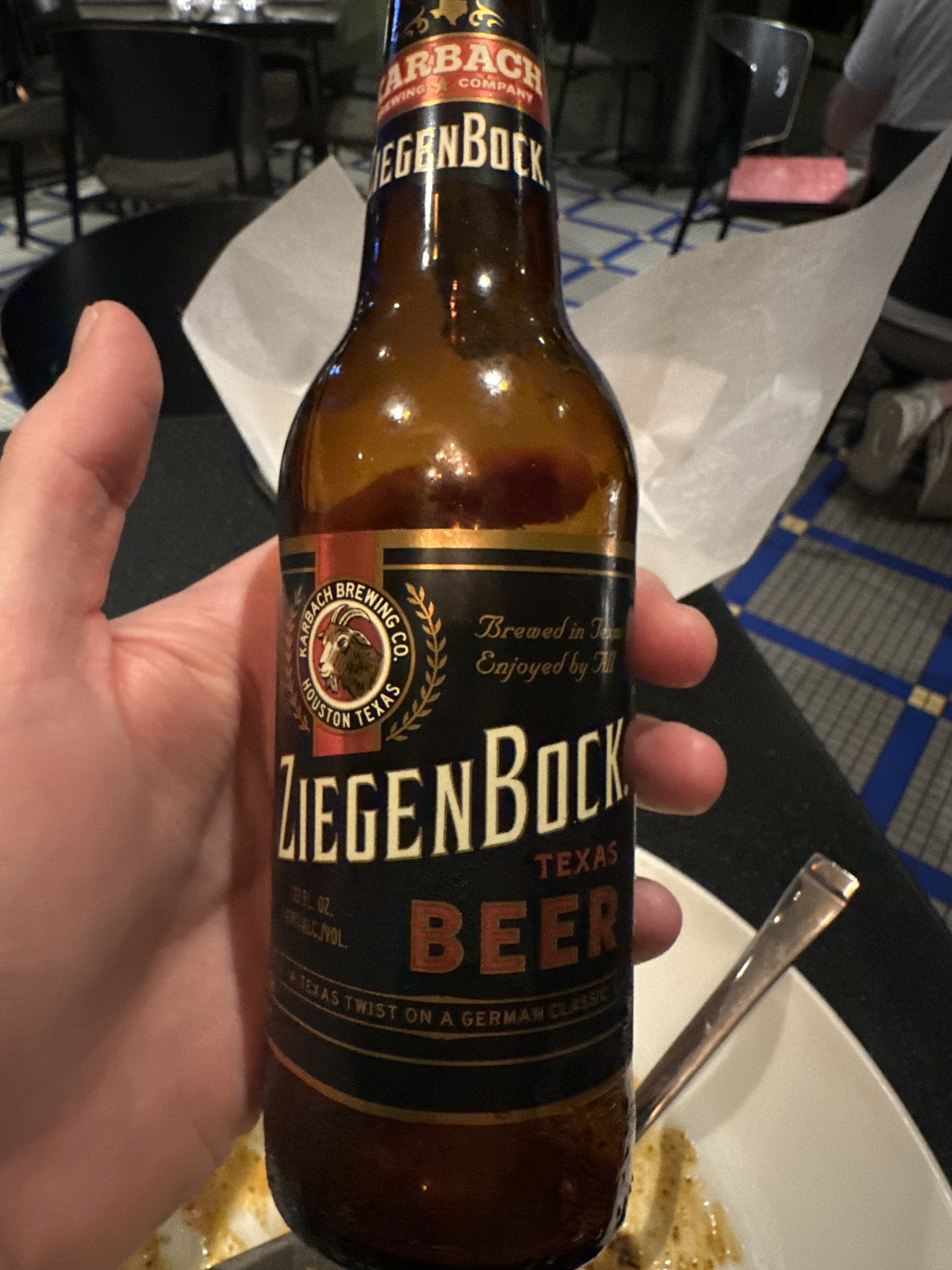
A bottle of Ziegenbock Texas Bock beer

Ziegenbock (stylized as ZiegenBock) is a German amber lager brewed by Karbach Brewing Company. It is billed as "for Texans by Texans," and distributed in the U.S. state of Texas and nearby states. Ziegenbock is the German word for a billy goat.

Ziegenbock is marketed as a Texas-brewed Bock-Style Beer (Import - Craft - Specialty) and positioned as a Texan beer to compete with Shiner Bock. Ziegenbock is brewed by Karbach Brewing Company, a subsidiary of Anheuser-Busch, in Houston, Texas. Anheuser-Busch decided the brand made enough money in Texas to be profitable; however, the brand occupied valuable fermenter space that could otherwise be used for even more profitable brands. As such, Anheuser-Busch decided to re-brand the beer and had Karbach take over production. Like Amber Bock, it does not conform to the BJCP style guidelines for a Bock, either in terms of flavor profile or potency because the brewery uses food coloring to achieve the desired color, as opposed to using malt to achieve the desired color.

== Ziegfest ==
Ziegfest is an annual music festival sponsored by Anheuser-Busch, themed around Ziegenbock. Ziegfest typically features Texas/Red Dirt musicians. There are typically several venues with the events scheduled around a month apart.
