= Dutch Gold =

Alcoholic beer sold in Ireland

- The '4 for 5' Dutch Gold package
- Type: pilsner
- Alcohol by volume: 3.5% ABV

Dutch Gold is an imported, pilsner lager beer sold only in Ireland. It was launched there in 1995.

== The Beer ==
Dutch Gold was originally brewed in Breda, Netherlands by Oranjeboom, and exported to Ireland. The beer is distributed in Ireland by Comans Beverages, an importer and distributor of beers wines and spirits located in Tallaght, County Dublin. The beer originally contained 4.2% alcohol by volume. This was changed initially to 4% and then in 2022 to 3.5% alcohol by volume in order to align prices with Ireland's newly introduced minimum alcohol unit pricing laws. It is described by the distributor as having "a crisp, clean, fresh flavour".

== Irish retailing ==
In the Irish canned beer market, Dutch Gold has a market share of between 11% and 14%, making it the nation's third most popular beer after Budweiser and Heineken as of 2007. Dutch Gold is not advertised in the media, rather favouring in-store advertising. Competitive pricing and a variety of multi-pack offers are the primary promotional methods.

== Social and cultural implications ==
In 2006, the Gardaí launched a campaign against anti-social behaviour in Lucan under the name "Operation Dutch Gold". The distributors of the product, Comans Wholesale of Tallaght, complained that the naming of the project was unfair to them.

In 2005, University College Dublin had a Dutch Gold Society on campus, in a tribute to the beer.
