= Forget the Alamo: The Rise and Fall of an American Myth =

2021 history book

- First edition
- Author: Bryan Burrough, Chris Tomlinson, and Jason Stanford
- Language: English
- Genre: History
- Publisher: Penguin Press
- Publication date: 2021
- Publication place: United States

Forget the Alamo: The Rise and Fall of an American Myth is a 2021 history book written by the American authors Bryan Burrough, Chris Tomlinson, and Jason Stanford. It examines the story of the Battle of the Alamo, and argues that the heroic story of its defenders during the Texas Revolution is not accurate, and that it was not the important battle that it is often considered in Texas history lessons.
