= Karbach Brewing Company =

Brewery based in Houston, Texas

- Location: Houston, Texas
- Opened: 2011; 15 years ago
- Key people: Chuck Robertson (Co-founder); Ken Goodman (Co-founder)
- Owner: Anheuser-Busch InBev
- Website: karbachbrewing.com

Active beers
Name	Type
Hopadillo	India pale ale
Love Street	Kölsch Style
Rodeo Clown	Double India pale ale
Rodeo Clown	Imperial Hazy
Crawford Bock	Bock
Ranch Water Original	Hard seltzer
Clutch City Original	Lager

Karbach Brewing Company is a brewery based in Houston, Texas. Since 2016, it has been owned by Anheuser-Busch InBev. It was founded in 2011, when beverage industry veterans Chuck Robertson and Ken Goodman (of distributor C.R. Goodman) joined with Eric Warner, the former brewmaster and CEO of Flying Dog, on a new venture. The brewery is named for its location on Karbach Street in Houston's Spring Branch neighborhood.

In 2013, The New Yorker noted that Karbach was the second fastest-growing craft brewery in the U.S. In 2015, Karbach completed renovations on a $15 million expansion to its brewhouse, which also added an on-site restaurant.

In 2025, Karbach began brewing beer for Golden Road Brewing, a California based brewery also owned by Anheuser-Busch InBev. The beer is brewed and packaged at the facility and then shipped back to California for distribution.

Karbach was acquired by Anheuser-Busch InBev on November 3, 2016.

== Products ==
=== Ziegenbock ===
Ziegenbock is a German-style Bock beer. Brewed at 4.9% ABV, Ziegenbock is the flagship beer of Karbach Brewing Company.

=== Crawford Bock ===
Crawford Bock is marketed as a "Ballpark Beer". Its iconic can design is inspired by the tequila sunrise uniforms of the Houston Astros. This beer is named after the Crawford Boxes at Daikin Park, the home of the Astros. A percentage of Crawford Bock revenue goes towards the Astros Foundation.

=== Love Street Blonde ===
Love Street Blonde is a Kölsch-style beer, brewed at 4.9% ABV. The Love Street line of beers are named after the former Love Street Light Circus Feel Good Machine, a psychadelic nightclub at Allen's Landing, the birthplace of Houston, Texas.

==== Love Street Light ====
Love Street Light is a 4.2% light lager, derivative of Love Street Blonde.

=== Hopadillo ===
Hopadillo IPA is Karbach Brewing Company's most popular india pale ale offering. It's brewed at 6.6% ABV.

==== Hopadillo Hazy IPA ====
Hopadillo Hazy IPA is a 6% ABV offering, advertised as being brewed with "tropical fruit".

==== Hopadillo Juicy IPA ====
Also brewed with "tropical fruit", similar to Hopadillo Hazy, Hopadillo Juicy IPA is brewed at 7.3% ABV.

==== Hopadillo Imperial IPA ====
This citrus IPA is Karbach's strongest brewed product, resulting in a 9.9% ABV IPA.

=== Rodeo Clown Double IPA ===
With notes of toffee and stone fruit, Rodeo Clown Double IPA is similar in strength to Hopadillo Imperial IPA, coming to 9.5% ABV.

=== Free & Easy IPA ===
Free & Easy IPA is Karbach Brewing Company's non-alcoholic offering. Karbach describes it as having "orange zest, grapefruit, and citrus" aromas.

=== Ranch Water ===
Ranch Water is Karbach's hard seltzer offering. It is a "blend of hard seltzer with lime and agave." Ranch Water is offered in Original Lime, Prickly Pear, Watermelon, and Meyer Lemon.
