= The Rise and Fall of =

Disambiguation page

The Rise and Fall of is an English snowclone popularly used in titles of works. Examples of its usage include:

== Books ==
- The Rise and Fall of Adam and Eve, a book by Stephen Greenblatt
- The Rise and Fall of American Growth, a book by Robert J. Gordon
- The Rise and Fall of Belarusian Nationalism, 1906-1931, a book by Per Anders Rudling
- The Rise and Fall of the Christian Coalition, a book by Joel D. Vaughan
- The Rise and Fall of Comrade Zylo, a book by Dritëro Agolli
- The Rise and Fall of the Confederate Government, a book by Jefferson Davis
- The Rise and Fall of D.O.D.O., a book by Neal Stephenson and Nicole Galland
- The Rise and Fall of a Dragon King, a book by Lynn Abbey
- The Rise and Fall of Freedom of Contract, a text by Patrick Atiyah
- The Rise and Fall of the Great Powers, a book by Paul Kennedy
- The Rise and Fall of the Third Reich, a book by William Shirer
- The Rise and Fall of an Urban School System, a book by Jeffrey Mirel
- Aleppo: The Rise and Fall of Syria's Great Merchant City, a book by Philip Mansel
- American Tuna: The Rise and Fall of an Improbable Food, a book by Andrew F. Smith
- Ancient Maya: The Rise and Fall of a Rainforest Civilization, a book by Arthur Demarest
- The Big Rich: The Rise and Fall of the Greatest Texas Oil Fortunes, a book by Bryan Burrough
- Champagne and Baloney: The Rise and Fall of Finley's A's, a book by Tom Clark
- The Eugenics Wars: The Rise and Fall of Khan Noonien Singh, a set of books by Greg Cox
- Forget the Alamo: The Rise and Fall of an American Myth, a book by Bryan Burrough, Chris Tomlinson, and Jason Stanford
- The Generation: The Rise and Fall of the Jewish Communists of Poland, a book by Jaff Schatz
- Gods and Kings: The Rise and Fall of Alexander McQueen and John Galliano, a book by Dana Thomas
- History of the Rise and Fall of the Slave Power in America, a book by Henry Wilson
- Inhuman Bondage: The Rise and Fall of Slavery in the New World, a book by David Brion Davis
- Lebanese Christian Nationalism: The Rise and Fall of an Ethnic Resistance, a book by Walid Phares
- Not All Fairy Tales Have Happy Endings: The Rise and Fall of Sierra On-Line, a book by Ken Williams
- Nuclear Implosions: The Rise and Fall of the Washington Public Power Supply System, a book by Daniel Pope
- The Profession of Violence: The Rise and Fall of the Kray Twins, a book by John Pearson
- Season Finale: The Unexpected Rise and Fall of The WB and UPN, a book by Suzanne Daniels
- The Triple Package: How Three Unlikely Traits Explain the Rise and Fall of Cultural Groups in America, a book by Amy Chua and Jed Rubenfeld
- True Believer: The Rise and Fall of Stan Lee, a book by Abraham Riesman
- The Washing of the Spears: The Rise and Fall of the Zulu Nation, a book by Donald R. Morris
- When Genius Failed: The Rise and Fall of Long-Term Capital Management, a book by Roger Lowenstein
- The Rise and Fall of Diamonds: The Shattering of a Brilliant Illusion, a 1982 book by Edward Jay Epstein

== Films ==
- The Rise and Fall of the Brown Buffalo, a film by Phillip Rodriguez
- The Rise and Fall of ECW, a film by the WWE
- The Rise and Fall of English Montreal, a film by William Weintraub
- The Rise and Fall of the Great Lakes, a short film by the National Film Board of Canada
- Rise and Fall of Idi Amin, a film by Sharad Patel
- The Rise and Fall of Legs Diamond, a film by Budd Boetticher
- The Rise and Fall of a White Collar Hooligan, a film by Paul Tanter
- All Things Must Pass: The Rise and Fall of Tower Records, a film by Colin Hanks
- Black Fox: The Rise and Fall of Adolf Hitler, a film by Louis Clyde Stoumen
- Call Me: The Rise and Fall of Heidi Fleiss, a film broadcast by USA Network
- Client 9: The Rise and Fall of Eliot Spitzer, a film by Alex Gibney
- Glitch: The Rise & Fall of HQ Trivia, a film by Salima Koroma
- Going to Pieces: The Rise and Fall of the Slasher Film, a film by Jeff McQueen
- Heaven on Earth: The Rise and Fall of Socialism, a film broadcast by PBS
- Live Forever: The Rise and Fall of Brit Pop, a film by John Dower
- Love, Charlie: The Rise and Fall of Chef Charlie Trotter, a film by Rebecca Halpern
- Miracle in the Desert: The Rise and Fall of the Salton Sea, a film by Greg Bassenian
- Misfire: The Rise and Fall of the Shooting Gallery, a film by Whitney Ransick
- Mr. Death: The Rise and Fall of Fred A. Leuchter, Jr., a film by Errol Morris
- Stoked: The Rise and Fall of Gator, a film by Helen Stickler
- Tulip Time: The Rise and Fall of the Trio Lescano, a film by Memphis Film
- Unforgivable Blackness: The Rise and Fall of Jack Johnson, a film by Ken Burns
- Untold: The Rise and Fall of AND1, a film by Kevin Wilson Jr.

== Television ==
- The Rise and Fall of Wellington Boots, a 1975 TV series by the Australian Broadcasting Corporation
- Guts and Glory: The Rise and Fall of Oliver North, a 1989 TV series by Mike Robe
- Ancient Rome: The Rise and Fall of an Empire, a 2006 TV series broadcast by the BBC
- "The Rise and Fall of Sue Sylvester", a 2015 episode of Glee

== Music ==
- "The Rise and Fall of Flingel Bunt", a 1964 song by The Shadows
- The Rise and Fall of the Third Stream, a 1968 album by Joe Zawinul
- The Rise and Fall of Ziggy Stardust and the Spiders from Mars, a 1972 album by David Bowie
- Rise and Fall of a Decade, a 1988 band
- The Rise and Fall of Butch Walker and the Let's-Go-Out-Tonites, a 2006 album by Butch Walker
- The Rise & Fall of Ruby Woo, a 2007 album by The Puppini Sisters
- Doap Traffiking: The Rise and Fall of Darth Nixon, a 2011 album by Doap Nixon
- The Rise and Fall of Bossanova, a 2016 album by Michael J. Bostwick
- The Rise and Fall of a Midwest Princess, a 2023 album by Chappell Roan

== Others ==
- Rise and Fall of the City of Mahagonny, a 1930 opera by Kurt Weill
- The Rise and Fall of the Trigan Empire, a 1965 comic series by Mike Butterworth
- The Rise and Fall of Little Voice, a 1992 play by Jim Cartwright
- The Rise and Fall of Mars Hill, a 2021 podcast broadcast by Christianity Today

== Variations on the phrase ==
- The Rise and Rise of Michael Rimmer, a 1970 film starring Peter Cook
- The Fall and Rise of Reginald Perrin, a 1976 sitcom starring Leonard Rossiter
- The Rise and Rise of Daniel Rocket, a 1984 play by Peter Parnell
- The Rise and Rise of Bitcoin, a 2014 documentary film
- The Fall and Rise of Hugh Cornwell, a 2015 album by Hugh Cornwell
- The Fall and Rise of Reggie Dinkins, a 2026 American sports sitcom.
- The Fall and Rise of Jimmy Hoffa, a 1972 non-fiction book by Walter Sheridan

== See also ==
- Rise and Fall (disambiguation)
- The Decline and Fall of, a similar snowclone
