= Superforce =

Superforce may refer to:

- A single, unified force in a Theory of everything/unified field theory or Grand unification theory.
- Superforce, a book by Paul Davies on the search for a single, unified force.
- Superforce, a central concept developed by Malachi Martin in his book The Keys of This Blood
- Super Force, a 1990s SciFi TV series about a vigilante cop in powered Armour.
