= The Decline and Fall of =

Disambiguation page

The Decline and Fall of (alternatively Decline and Fall of) is an English snowclone popularly used in titles of works. It originates from The History of the Decline and Fall of the Roman Empire, a book by Edward Gibbon released between 1776 and 1789.

Later examples of its usage include:

== Books ==
- Decline and Fall of the American Programmer, a book by Edward Yourdon
- Decline and Fall of the Freudian Empire, a book by Hans Eysenck
- The Decline and Fall of Nokia, a book by David J. Cord
- The Decline and Fall of the Roman Church, a book by Malachi Martin
- The Rising Sun: The Decline and Fall of the Japanese Empire, 1936–1945, a book by John Toland

== Music ==
- The Decline and Fall of Heavenly, an album by Heavenly
- Arthur (Or the Decline and Fall of the British Empire), an album by The Kinks

== Other ==
- Decline and Fall of the Roman Empire, a board game by the Wargames Research Group

== See also ==
- Decline and Fall (disambiguation)
- The Rise and Fall of, a similar snowclone
