= Catherine Gallagher =

American literary critic and Victorianist

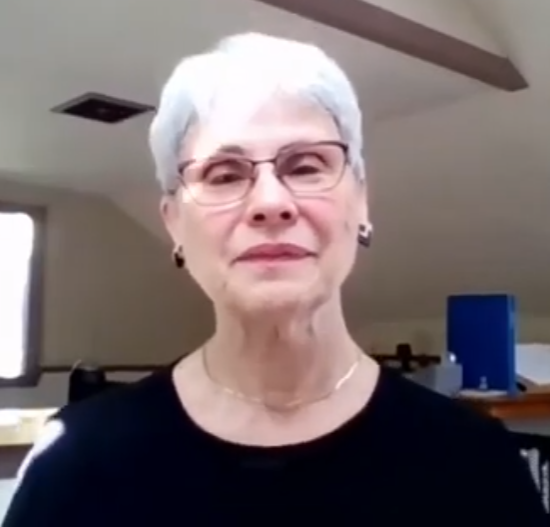
- Gallagher in 2020
- Born: February 16, 1945 (age 81)
- Occupations: Literary critic, professor
- Employer: University of California, Berkeley
- Spouse: Martin Jay (m. c. 1973)

Catherine Gallagher (born February 16, 1945) is an American historicist literary critic, and Victorianist, and is Professor Emerita of English at the University of California, Berkeley.

Gallagher is the author of Nobody's Story: The Vanishing Acts of Women Writers in the Marketplace, 1670-1820 (1994), which documented significant literary works that had previously been overlooked. Gallagher is also the author of The Body Economic: Life, Death, and Sensation in Political Economy and the Victorian Novel (2005) and Telling It Like It Wasn't: The Counterfactual Imagination in History and Fiction (2018). She is married to Martin Jay, a faculty member of the History department at UC Berkeley. She gave the 1996 Master-Mind Lecture. She is a recipient of the Berlin Prize Fellowship from the American Academy in Berlin (2011) and the Jacques Barzun Prize in Cultural History (2018). In 2020 she was elected to the American Philosophical Society.

== Selected works ==
- The Industrial Reformation of English Fiction. Social Discourse and Narrative Form, 1832-67. Chicago: University of Chicago Press, 1985
- The Making of the Modern Body. Sexuality and Society in the Nineteenth Century. Ed. and intro. with Thomas Laqueur. Berkeley: University of California Press, 1987.
- Nobody's Story. The Vanishing Acts of Women Writers in the Marketplace, 1670-1820. Berkeley: University of California Press, 1994.
- Oroonoko; or, The Royal Slave, by Aphra Behn. Bedford Cultural Edition. Ed., intros, and headnotes. Bedford Books, 1999. With Simon Stern.
- Practicing New Historicism. With Stephen Greenblatt. Chicago: University of Chicago Press, 2000.
- The Body Economic : Life, Death, and Sensation in Political Economy and the Victorian Novel. Princeton: Princeton University Press, 2005. 2008 pbk edition
- Telling It Like It Wasn't: The Counterfactual Imagination in History and Fiction. Chicago: University of Chicago Press, 2018.

== See also ==
- Stephen Greenblatt
- Literary theory
- New historicism
