= Subversion (disambiguation) =

Subversion is an attempt to overthrow structures of authority.

Subversion may also refer to:

- Subversion and containment, a concept in literary studies
- Apache Subversion, a software versioning and revision control system
- "Subversion" (song), a 1996 gothic metal song
- Subversion (video game), a postponed computer game from Introversion Software
- Subversion (film), an upcoming action film starring Chris Hemsworth
