= Rise or Fall =

Rise or Fall may refer to:

- "Rise or Fall", 1986 song by Quiet Riot, in album QR III
- "Rise or Fall", 2003 song by Black Rebel Motorcycle Club, in album Take Them On, On Your Own
- Rise or Fall (album), 2004 album by Defiance

== See also ==
- Rise and Fall (disambiguation)
