= Veeser =

Veeser is a surname. Notable people with the surname include:

- Harold Aram Veeser (born 1950), American professor
- Roger Veeser (1919–2010), Swiss athlete
