= Ramie Targoff =

American literary scholar

Ramie Targoff (born 1967) is an American literary scholar and author. She is the Jehuda Reinharz Professor of the Humanities at Brandeis University, where she is also a Professor of English and Chair of Italian Studies. Her research focuses on lyric poetry, devotional literature, and women writers in Renaissance England and Italy.

== Education ==
Targoff received her Bachelor of Arts in English from Yale University in 1989. She completed her Ph.D. in English at the University of California, Berkeley in 1996.

== Career ==
Targoff began her academic career as an Assistant Professor of English at Yale University (1996–2001). In 2001, she joined the faculty of Brandeis University as an Assistant Professor of English, becoming Associate Professor in 2003 and Professor of English in 2008. She was the founding director of Brandeis's Mandel Center for the Humanities from 2010 to 2021. In 2021, she was named the Jehuda Reinharz Professor of the Humanities.

Targoff is the Principal Investigator for Petrarch in Global Translation: A Genealogy of Western Love, an international research project funded by the NOMIS Foundation in Zurich, Switzerland.

Targoff's scholarly monographs on early modern literature have examined public religion, lyric poetry, and Renaissance conceptions of love and mortality. Her 2001 study, Common Prayer: The Language of Public Devotion in Early Modern England, received the Best Book of the Year Award from the Conference on Christianity and Literature and was reviewed in journals including Shakespeare Quarterly and the Journal of the American Academy of Religion.

Her 2008 book, John Donne, Body and Soul, was reviewed in The New York Review of Books, Renaissance Quarterly, and Common Knowledge.

Her 2014 study, Posthumous Love: Eros and the Afterlife in Renaissance England, was named a finalist for the Phi Beta Kappa Society's Christian Gauss Prize and received an honorable mention for the Modern Language Association's James Russell Lowell Prize. It was reviewed in publications including The Irish Times and Renaissance Quarterly.

Her 2018 biography, Renaissance Woman: The Life of Vittoria Colonna, examined the life and poetry of the Italian noblewoman Vittoria Colonna and was reviewed in The New York Times, The Wall Street Journal, The New Yorker, and Kirkus Reviews.

In 2024, Targoff published Shakespeare’s Sisters: How Women Wrote the Renaissance, which received critical attention in major national publications, including reviews in The New York Times, The Guardian, The Wall Street Journal, The Times Literary Supplement, and The New Yorker.

=== Authored books ===
- Shakespeare’s Sisters: How Women Wrote the Renaissance (Alfred A. Knopf, US edition, 2024; Riverrun, UK edition, 2024; paperback 2025).
  - Italian translation: Le Sorelle di Shakespeare: Storia Delle Quattro Donne che Scrissero Il Rinascimento (Milan: Mondadori, 2025).
  - German translation: Shakespeares Schwestern: Wie Frauen die Renaissance schrieben (Berlin: Suhrkamp/Insel, 2026).
  - Polish translation: Siostry Szekspira: Jak kobiety tworzyły renesans (Kraków: Bo wiem, 2026).
- Renaissance Woman: The Life of Vittoria Colonna (Farrar, Straus and Giroux, 2018; paperback 2019).
- Posthumous Love: Eros and the Afterlife in Renaissance England (University of Chicago Press, 2014).
- John Donne, Body and Soul (University of Chicago Press, 2008; paperback 2009).
- Common Prayer: The Language of Public Devotion in Early Modern England (University of Chicago Press, 2001).

=== Edited volumes ===
- Love after Death in the Mediterranean World from Antiquity through the Renaissance. Co-edited with Bernhard Jussen (Berlin: Akademie Verlag, World Literature series, 2014).
- Sir Thomas Browne: Religio Medici and Urn-Burial. Co-edited with Stephen Greenblatt (New York Review Books Classic Book Series, 2012).

=== Translations ===
- Vittoria Colonna, Poems of Widowhood: A Bilingual Edition of the 1538 Rime (Toronto: Iter Press, The Other Voice in Early Modern Europe: The Toronto Series, 2021).

== Honors and fellowships ==
- 1994–1995: Mellon Dissertation Fellowship, University of California, Berkeley
- 1995–1996: Townsend Center Dissertation Fellowship, University of California, Berkeley
- 1995–1996: National Endowment for the Humanities Dissertation Year Grant
- 1998–1999: Morse Fellowship, Yale University
- 2000: Heyman Prize for Junior Faculty in the Humanities, Yale University
- 2001: Best Book of the Year Award, Christianity and Literature (for Common Prayer)
- 2003–2004: Wissenschaftskolleg zu Berlin Fellowship
- 2009–2010: American Council of Learned Societies (ACLS) Fellowship
- 2011: Stewart Fellow in the Humanities Council, Princeton University
- 2012: American Academy in Rome Scholar in Residence
- 2013: Guggenheim Fellowship
- 2015: Christian Gauss Prize Finalist, Phi Beta Kappa Society (for Posthumous Love)
- 2015: James Russell Lowell Prize (Honorable Mention), Modern Language Association (for Posthumous Love)
- 2019: Distinguished Publication Award, John Donne Society
- 2024–2028: NOMIS Foundation Research Grant (for Petrarch in Global Translation)
