= Martin Jay =

American intellectual historian (born 1944)

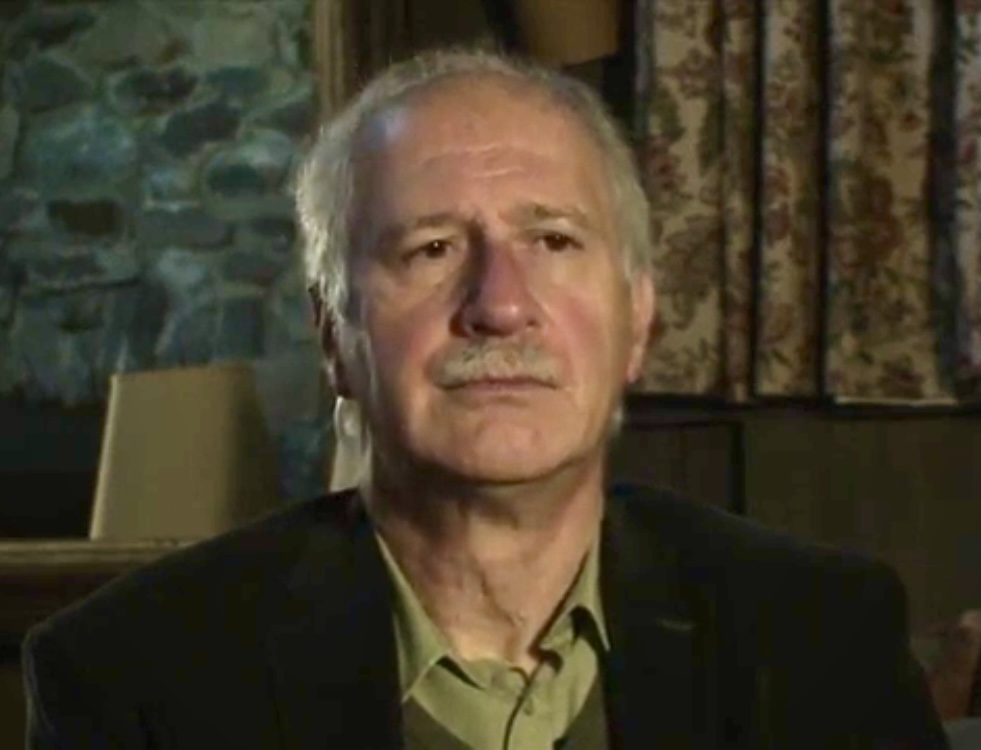
- Jay in 2014
- Born: Martin Evan Jay; May 4, 1944 (age 82); New York City, US
- Spouse: Catherine Gallagher (m. c. 1973)

Academic background
- Education: Union College; Harvard University
- Thesis: Frankfurt School (1971)
- Doctoral advisor: H. Stuart Hughes

Academic work
- Discipline: History
- Sub-discipline: Intellectual history
- School or tradition: Critical theory
- Institutions: University of California, Berkeley
- Doctoral students: Peter Gordon; Dirk Moses; Samuel Moyn
- Main interests: German intellectual history; critical theory; visual culture
- Notable works: The Dialectical Imagination (1973)

Martin Evan Jay (born May 4, 1944) is an American intellectual historian whose research interests connect history with Frankfurt School critical theory, social theory, cultural criticism, visual culture, and historiography.

He is the Sidney Hellman Ehrman Professor of History Emeritus at UC Berkeley, where he taught for 45 years and co-founded (with Judith Butler) the Designated Emphasis in Critical Theory (2007–2016). He was elected to the American Academy of Arts and Sciences (1996) and American Philosophical Society (2019), received the American Historical Association’s Award for Scholarly Distinction (2018) and was awarded an Honorary Doctorate from Bard College (2018).

Conferences on his work were held at the University of Wrocław (2010), the University of California, Berkeley (2016), Ritsumeikan University, Kyoto (2018), Queen Mary College, London (2018), and the University of Pennsylvania (2024). A Festschrift, The Modernist Imagination, was published in 2009.

== Early life and education ==
Jay is a graduate of Bronx High School of Science (1961). He earned a BA from Union College in 1965 and spent his junior year abroad at the London School of Economics. He completed his Ph.D. at Harvard (1971) under H. Stuart Hughes; his dissertation became The Dialectical Imagination (1973), a prize-winning account of the Frankfurt School. At Berkeley, he became close with Leo Lowenthal, the last surviving member of the School’s first generation, who aided his research.

== Career ==
Jay continued exploring the Frankfurt School through major works on Adorno (1984), Reason after Its Eclipse (2016), Splinters in Your Eye (2021), Immanent Critiques (2023), and three edited volumes for Japanese readers.

He expanded his scope to the intellectual migration from Nazi Germany (Permanent Exiles, 1985; Kracauer l’exilé, 2014) and Western Marxism (Marxism and Totality, 1984), including extensive discussions of Jürgen Habermas. His engagement with French post-structuralism led to Downcast Eyes (1993), recognized as a seminal text in the study of visual culture, and the widely cited essay, "Scopic Regimes of Modernity" (1987).

His book Songs of Experience (2004) examined the role of "experience" in scientific, religious, historical, political and aesthetic discourses in Europe and America, while The Virtues of Mendacity (2010) tackled lying in politics. Drawing on Hannah Arendt, in Virtues, he defended the inevitability of everyday strategic political deception against the pursuit of one settled, monolithic truth, the aim of totalitarianism, provided it doesn't escalate into the kind of systematic fabrication or "big lie" he traced via Hitler's Mein Kampf (My Struggle).

Jay contributed to methodological debates in intellectual history in Cultural Semantics (1998) and Genesis and Validity (2022). His Magical Nominalism (2025) argued that a covert strain of religiously inflected philosophical thought, from Walter Benjamin and Marcel Duchamp to Theodor W. Adorno and Roland Barthes, and Siegfried Kracauer, sought to escape subsumptive categorization, valorize singularity, and resist the disenchantment of the world often traced to conventional nominalism. It manifested itself in diverse places, ranging from the linguistic elevation of the name over concepts and the role of the "event" in disrupting historical continuity to what Barthes called the "punctum" of certain photographs.

Since 1987, he has written the semi-annual Force Fields column in Salmagundi, with many entries republished in collections of his essays (including several compiled in French and Spanish). Jay's current project on "theological fellow-traveling" analyzes secular philosophers who selectively draw on theological concepts without observing the religious practices they justify and sanction. He is a recipient of the 2010/2011 Berlin Prize Fellowship from the American Academy in Berlin. In 2023, he published a sequel to The Dialectical Imagination on the contemporary turns in Critical Theory, entitled Immanent Critiques: The Frankfurt School Under Pressure.

He also has a regular column in the quarterly journal Salmagundi.

== Fellowships and lectures ==
He held prestigious fellowships from the Guggenheim, NEH, Rockefeller, and ACLS Foundations, as well as residential fellowships at the Stanford Humanities Center, the Institute for Advanced Study in Princeton, the National Humanities Center, and the American Academy in Berlin. He was a visiting fellow of St. Antony’s College, Oxford and Clare Hall, Cambridge. Among his key lectures were the Gauss Seminars (Princeton, 2002), the Faculty Research Lecture (Berkeley, 2007), the Richards Lectures (Virginia, 2008), and the Mosse Lectures (Jerusalem, 2013).

== Personal life ==
Jay was born on May 4, 1944, in New York City. He married Catherine Gallagher in 1974, and has a daughter, Rebecca Jay, stepdaughter Shana Gallagher, and four grandchildren. They met in 1970 at Berkeley when she was an English graduate student and he was an assistant professor of history.

He was born in New York City to Edward and Sari Joslovitz (née Sidel), who shortened the family surname to Jay in 1951. His sister, Beth Jay (b. 1948), was principal attorney to three California Supreme Court Chief Justices. He is Jewish but not religious.

== Published works ==
- 1973 The Dialectical Imagination: A History of the Frankfurt School and the Institute of Social Research, 1923-50
- 1984 Marxism and Totality: The Adventures of a Concept from Lukács to Habermas
- 1984 Adorno. Fontana Modern Masters.
- 1985 Permanent Exiles: Essays on the Intellectual Migration from Germany to America
- 1988 Fin-de-Siècle Socialism and Other Essays
- 1993 Force Fields: Between Intellectual History and Cultural Criticism
- 1993 Downcast Eyes: The Denigration of Vision in Twentieth-Century French Thought
- 1998 Cultural Semantics: Keywords of the Age
- 2003 Refractions of Violence
- 2004 Songs of Experience: Modern American and European Variations on a Universal Theme
- 2010 The Virtues of Mendacity: On Lying in Politics
- 2011 Essays from the Edge: Parerga and Paralipomena
- 2016 Reason after Its Eclipse: On Late Critical Theory
- 2020 Splinters in Your Eye: Frankfurt School Provocations
- 2021 Genesis and Validity: The Theory and Practice of Intellectual History
- 2023 Immanent Critiques: The Frankfurt School under Pressure
- 2025 Magical Nominalism: The Historical Event, Aesthetic Reenchantment, and the Photograph

=== Selected articles ===
- "Adorno and the Role of Sublimation…" (New German Critique, 2021)
- "The Authoritarian Personality…" (Polity, 2022)
- "The Truth about Lying in Politics" (Electra, 2024)
- “The Vicissitudes of Empathy: Reflections on the Israeli-Palestinian Conflict" (Journal of Genocide Research, 2025)
- "Building New Rafts. Trump's Inheritance…” (Salmagundi, 2025)

== See also ==
- American philosophy
- List of American philosophers
