= The Swerve =

2011 book by Stephen Greenblatt

The Swerve: How the World Became Modern
- Author: Stephen Greenblatt
- Language: English
- Genre: Nonfiction
- Publisher: W. W. Norton & Company (hardcover); The Bodley Head (UK)
- Publication date: September 2011 (hardcover) ISBN 9780393064476; ASIN: B005LW5J9O (kindle US) (mobipocket UK)ISBN 9781446499290 (epub) ISBN 9780393083385; September 2012 (paperback) ISBN 9780099572442; June 2015 (audiobook) ISBN 9781501260506
- Publication place: United States, UK
- Pages: 368 (hardcover)

The Swerve: How the World Became Modern (Note: Published as The Swerve: How the Renaissance Began in the United Kingdom.) is a 2011 book by Stephen Greenblatt and winner of the 2012 Pulitzer Prize for General Nonfiction and 2011 National Book Award for Nonfiction.

Greenblatt tells the story of how Poggio Bracciolini, a 15th-century papal emissary and obsessive book hunter, saved the last copy of the Roman poet Lucretius's De rerum natura (On the Nature of Things) from near-terminal neglect in a German monastery, thus reintroducing important ideas that sparked the modern age.

The title and the subtitle of the book are explained in the author's preface. "The Swerve" refers to a key conception in Epicurean atomism which holds that atoms moving through the void are subject to clinamen: while falling straight through the void, they are sometimes subject to a slight, unpredictable swerve. Greenblatt uses it to describe the history of Lucretius' own book: "The reappearance of his poem was such a swerve, an unforeseen deviation from the direct trajectory—in this case, toward oblivion—on which that poem and its philosophy seemed to be traveling." The recovery of the ancient text is seen as its rebirth, i.e. a "renaissance". Greenblatt's claim is that it was a 'key moment' in a larger "story ... of how the world swerved in a new direction".

== Reception ==
The book attracted considerable critical attention, some positive and some negative. In addition to winning both the Pulitzer Prize and National Book Award, it also won the Modern Language Association James Russell Lowell Prize.

Publishers Weekly called it a "gloriously learned page-turner", and Newsweek called it "mesmerizing" and "richly entertaining". Maureen Corrigan, in her review for NPR, praised the work as brilliant and brimming with ideas and stories. It was included in the 2011 year-end lists of Publishers Weekly, The New York Times, Kirkus Reviews, NPR, The Chicago Tribune, Bloomberg, SFGate, the American Library Association and The Globe and Mail.

Writing in The New Republic, David Quint saw the book as situated in a controversial tradition that views the Renaissance as a victory of reason over medieval religiosity, following John Addington Symonds, Voltaire and David Hume. Theologian R. R. Reno harshly criticized the book for "blustering again and again about the beauty-loathing, eros-denying evils of Christianity ... sighing in the usual postmodern way about pleasure and desire."

Historian John Monfasani credited the book with "grace and learning" but found Greenblatt's Voltairean and Burckhardtian interpretation of De Rerum Natura and the Renaissance as "eccentric", "questionable" and "unwarranted". Greenblatt responded to this critique by reiterating his view of the importance of the Renaissance in history. Several other reviewers criticized Greenblatt's lack of historical rigor and depth while acknowledging some praiseworthy elements. In the Los Angeles Review of Books Jim Hinch saw within the book "two books... one deserving of an award, the other not". He described the first "book" as an "engaging" and "wonderful" exploration of the Renaissance rediscovery of De Rerum Natura, while describing the second book as a far less deserving "anti-religious polemic."

Michael Dirda, of The Washington Post, wrote that "by no means a bad book, The Swerve simply sets its intellectual bar too low, complacently relying on commonplaces in its historical sections and never engaging in an imaginative or idiosyncratic way". Disappointed with the book's simplistic and clichéd conclusions, he nonetheless saw Greenblatt's "excellent notes and bibliography" as a reliable reference for those seeking a more in-depth and serious treatment.

In 2013, William Caferro of Vanderbilt University found The Swerve "an engaging portrait of the Renaissance sense of wonder and discovery" but was disquieted by the "firm distinction Greenblatt makes between the Renaissance and the Middle Ages" and the lack of reference to current scholarship. Nevertheless, he conceded that "if Greenblatt leaves us with more questions than answers, it is ultimately not a grave flaw."

In 2016, Laura Saetveit Miles, of the University of Bergen, criticized the book in explicitly ethical terms, writing that its scholarly and historiographical failings "represent an abuse of power" that "precipitate the decline of the humanities" by lending scholarly authority to the "dire trend of 'truthy' nonfiction books that present One Theory to Explain Everything." She argued that the book is an "injustice to the past" and "the mythical invention of modernity is an ethical issue, because it sets a precedent for history that ignores complexity in favor of oversimplification."
