= Subversion and containment =

Subversion and containment is a concept in literary studies introduced by Stephen Greenblatt in his 1988 essay "Invisible Bullets". It has subsequently become a much-used concept in new historicist and cultural materialist approaches to textual analysis. Literary critic Louis A. Montrose writes that the terms are often used to refer to the "capacity of the dominant order to generate subversion so as to use it to its own ends".

== The English in the New World ==
In his essay "Invisible Bullets", Greenblatt introduced the concept of subversion and containment as an instrument by describing Thomas Harriot's report on his experience in the colony of Virginia in 1586. Sir Walter Raleigh's duty had been in part to bring civilisation to the Native Americans (then referred to as Indians). As civilisation was purportedly impossible without Christianity, this was to be imposed upon the Native Americans. Harriot documented two relevant observations in his Brief and True Report of the New Found Land of Virginia. Firstly, that the natives had a degree of religion to their culture of which Harriot drew parallels to Christianity. Secondly, he noticed that everyday non-divine objects caused the natives to believe in the divinity of the invaders, noting

"Most things they saw with us, as mathematical instruments, sea compasses, the virtue of the lodestone in drawing iron, a perspective glass whereby was shown many strange sights, burning glasses, wildfire works, gun, book, writing and reading, spring clocks that seemed to go off by themselves, and many other things that we had, were so strange unto them and so far exceeded their capabilities to comprehend the reason and means how they should be made and done that they thought they were rather the works of gods than of men, or at the leastwise they had been given and taught us of the gods"

It would seem that Harriot used this to impose Christianity upon the natives. At one point, as the native crop was scarce one year, Harriot suggested that the Christian God would provide better for their land. Thus the subversion was both produced and contained.

This theory immediately implies maliciousness and Machiavellian callousness; this is not always the case. Greenblatt takes pains to stress that Harriot may not have been acting maliciously. The name of the essay, Invisible Bullets, reflects that the subversion must be invisible to the subverted; Harriot could not simply state that the natives were being converted to (or assimilated into) another religion and culture. If the subversion and containment were invisible to Harriot, he would be merely an agent of hegemony. It is not unlikely that Harriot wholeheartedly believed that England and its people were blessed by the only true Christian God, that the very fact that he was born into the bourgeoisie provided his intellectual (and divine) superiority, in which case he would have been acting out of compassion.

== Calculated production of subversion ==
During Columbus's fourth voyage, the natives began aggression towards the invaders. Columbus, after consulting his calendars warned that God would demonstrate his favour towards the Europeans. Only he knew that a solar eclipse was to shortly occur. This subverted the natives' belief system.

== Application as theatrical theory ==
Greenblatt originally wrote of this theory in its application to theatre. He applied it extensively to Shakespeare's Henry IV, Part 1, Henry IV, Part 2 and Henry V, but has largely been disputed in his initial findings.

Stephen Weeks, in his essay The Question of Liz: Staging the Prisoner in 'Our Country's Good' applied the Theory to Timberlake Wertenbaker's Our Country's Good. Here, Weeks chronicles the Machiavellian connotations shadowing the teaching of 'high' language to a group of convicts. The convicts have their own codes and culture. They are offered the chance to take part in a theatrical performance, which gives them 'high language' that can be used to get them out of trouble. The language, however, is packaged with parts of culture which eventually causes them to betray their own culture and dreams. On the surface, Our Country's Good is a play about people discovering art but Weeks exposes this as an imperial act of production and containment and subversion. Again it is ambiguous whether the English officer is callously converting the convicts or whether he is merely an agent of English imperial hegemony attempting benevolence.

== See also ==
- Stephen Greenblatt
- Thomas Harriot
- Machiavelli
- Sir Walter Raleigh
- Timberlake Wertenbaker
