= Windswept House: A Vatican Novel =

1996 novel by Malachi Martin

Windswept House
- First edition
- Author: Malachi Martin
- Language: English
- Genre: Fiction
- Publisher: Doubleday
- Publication date: May 1996
- Publication place: United States
- Media type: Print (Hardcover)
- Pages: 656
- ISBN: 0-385-48408-9
- OCLC: 33948860
- Dewey Decimal: 813/.54
- LC Class: PS3563.A725W56 1996

Windswept House: A Vatican Novel is a 1996 novel by former Jesuit priest Malachi Martin. The novel details turmoil within the Catholic Church and corruption in Vatican City. Malachi alleged the novel depicted real events in the form a non-fiction novel similar to the works of Taylor Caldwell, or Truman Capote's In Cold Blood.

== Plot ==
Windswept House describes a satanic ritual—the enthronement of Lucifer—taking place at Saint Paul's Chapel inside Vatican City, on June 29, 1963. The book gives a depiction of high-ranking churchmen, taking oaths signed with their own blood, plotting to destroy the Church from within. It tells the story of an international organized attempt by these Vatican insiders and secular internationalists to force a pope of the Catholic Church to abdicate, so that a successor may be chosen that will fundamentally change orthodox faith and establish a New World Order.

== Characters ==
- The Slavic Pope. A geopolitical genius, the Slavic Pope is embattled against the forces of the New World Order and Satan in his defense of the Roman Catholic Church.
- Christian Gladstone. A conservative and passionate young priest who descends from the all-powerful Roman Catholic family of the American southwest, the Gladstones. Becomes a pawn in the advancement of the destruction of his beloved Church.
- Father Aldo Carnesecca. A simple and unassuming priest who has lived through four popes, Father Carnesecca is valued by his Vatican superiours as "a man of confidences." Unwilling to compromise his principles on the one hand or to cross the threshold of disillusionment and bitterness on the other, he has acquired a detailed knowledge of significant facts, friendships, incidents and decisions in the Rome of the popes. An expert in the rise and fall of the greats, he acts as a valued and intimate advisor to the embattled Slavic Pope, and becomes a valued and intimate friend to Christian Gladstone. Ultimately, his knowledge of hidden things leads not only to a maniacal scheme against his life, but to the unraveling of the darkest mystery lying at the heart of papal Rome.
- Master General Damien Slattery. Father-General of the Dominican Order, the Irish giant, Father Damien Duncan Slattery is a man of extraordinary appetite, and the dimensions to go with it. Slattery is Irish to the core, and the staunchest of the staunch among the small band of supporters dedicated to the papacy and to the Slavic Pope. Archenemy of Cardinal Maestroianni.
- Cardinal Silvio Aureatini. A quick-witted man who is a young Cardinal of international accomplishment and huge ambition. A close associate of Cardinal Maestroianni and by his role in the Vatican's powerful Christian Adult Renewal Rite, Aureatini has improved his standing as a mover and shaker in the grave matters of foreign policy.
- Cyrus Benthoek. The American head of a powerful transnational law firm based in London. Benthoek is a long-time friend of Cardinal Secretary of State Maestroianni and is held in the highest regard by those in the highest reaches of global power and is one of the main players in the New World Order's plan for worldwide change.
- Gibson Appleyard. A US State Department agent who is tasked as an international trouble shooter for the president of the United States and a special committee of industrialist advisors. Appleyard is ordered to oversee the EC's plan for Greater European Market in relation to US interests.
- Francesca "Cessi" Gladstone. The matriarchal leader of the powerful Gladstone family. A devout, conservative Catholic who does not recognise the legitimacy of the church after the Second Vatican Council and goes on to challenge both the head of the Vatican Bank, and the Slavic Pope, to boot.

== Non-fiction novel ==
Martin alleged his novel included "real events and real people" retold as a non-fiction novel:

[R]oughly 85% of the fictional characters mirror real people, and roughly 85% of events in the book mirror real events, except those which are obviously mythic, such as the final stay of the Slavic Pope in Poland. We are talking about real events and real people masked in the form of a novel; nowadays it is called faction, a term coined by Norman Mailer, but an art form really created by Taylor Caldwell.

Martin frequently compared his novel to Truman Capote's In Cold Blood. In 1996, Martin was criticized for withholding details of a ritual murder from police investigators. Windswept House includes a fictionalized ritual murder with similar circumstances to the real-life event. Capote was also criticized for withholding facts from investigators during the writing of In Cold Blood.

In his radio interviews, Martin asserted the enthronement of Lucifer was "non-fiction". However, he is the only source for this alleged event.

== Reception ==
Peter Steinfels, in his column in The New York Times, described Windswept House as a "Papal potboiler" that "...employs almost every image of classic anti-Catholicism..." The Independent referred to the novel as a part of Martin's obsession with the "decline and fall" of the Catholic Church. According to Kirkus Reviews, the book "should find readers among Catholics and many evangelicals. Too slow-moving, and too specialized, for everyone else."
