= Future Jihad =

2005 book by Walid Phares

- Author: Walid Phares
- Language: English
- Publisher: St. Martin's Press
- Publication date: November 17, 2005
- Publication place: United States
- Pages: 288
- ISBN: 978-1403970749

Future Jihad: Terrorist Strategies Against America is a book by Middle East expert and scholar Walid Phares.

In this book Walid Phares presents his analysis of the Jihadist movement and the strategies it employs in its war against America and Western governments. Its influence in Republican circles was demonstrated by the fact that in 2007 it was listed as one of six books for the party's representatives to read during the summer recess.
