= The Rise and Fall of Adam and Eve =

2017 history book by Stephen Greenblatt

- First US edition
- Author: Stephen Greenblatt
- Language: English
- Genre: Non-fiction
- Publisher: W. W. Norton & Company (US); The Bodley Head (UK)
- Publication date: 2017
- Publication place: United States
- ISBN: 978-0-393-24080-1

The Rise and Fall of Adam and Eve is a non-fiction book by American literary historian Stephen Greenblatt, published in 2017. The book delves into the rise and fall of the story of Adam and Eve in Western culture.
