= Gone with the Wind in the Vatican =

1999 book

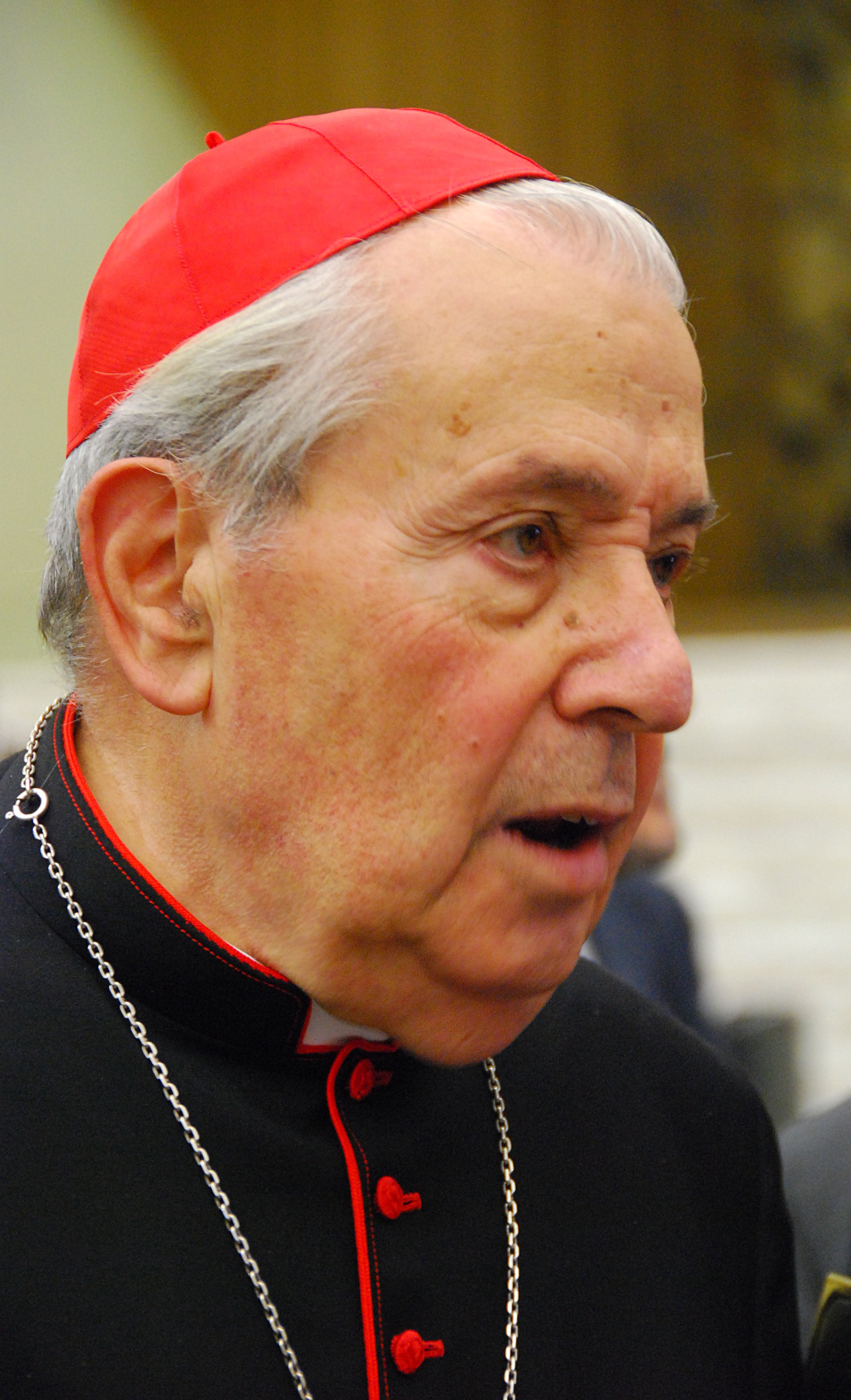
Cardinal Achille Silvestrini, Marinelli's former supervisor and prominent character in the book

Gone with the Wind in the Vatican (Italian: Via col Vento in Vaticano) is a book that was published in 1999, about nepotism, homosexual scandals, corruption, "clientism" and even Satanism within Vatican City, written under the pseudonym I Millenari ("The Millenarians"), a possible anagram of "Marinelli".

The book, published by Kaos Edizione of Milan, sold 100,000 copies in its first three weeks alone and went out of print within the year, before foreign-language editions became available.

== Authors ==
Monsignor Luigi Marinelli, a 72-year-old retired priest and former member of the Vatican's Congregation for Eastern Churches, admitted to his involvement in the 288-page book in 1999, and other curial priests are suspected to be his co-authors. Marinelli says that he had "nine or ten co-authors". According to Marinelli, "The book does not question the sanctity of Jesus Christ, the Eucharist or the Catholic Church. It just points out that the Vatican is made up of men, who, like me, are flawed."

== Contents ==
The main characters in the book are given pseudonyms from Margaret Mitchell's Gone with the Wind (1936). However, some of them have been identified, among them Cardinal Achille Silvestrini, Martinelli's former supervisor.

One anecdote in the book details a bishop being blackmailed by an illegitimate daughter. The book also raises questions about the death of Pope John Paul I. According to the book, Satanic masses have been celebrated inside the Vatican, with hooded participants naked from the waist down. Another anecdote details an affair between a young priest at the nunciature in Bern, Switzerland and a nun, who are both reassigned – the nun significantly less gainfully – with the help of the priest's influential Vatican patron.

== Reception ==
Some critics regard the work as little more than "another recent catalogue of papal sin" and consider the majority of its details dubious. Others have a more favorable view of the work, considering it a "kiss-and-tell classic".

== See also ==
- Alois Estermann
