= Lebanese Christian Nationalism: The Rise and Fall of an Ethnic Resistance =

1995 book by Walid Phares

- Author: Walid Phares
- Language: English
- Publisher: Lynne Rienner Pub
- Publication date: 1995
- Publication place: United States
- Pages: 251
- ISBN: 978-1555875350

Lebanese Christian Nationalism: The Rise and Fall of an Ethnic Resistance is a 1995 book by Middle East expert and scholar Walid Phares.

== Content ==
In this book Walid Phares examines the history and evolution of an ethnic community, the Lebanese Christians, and the rise and fall of an ethno-nationalist movement known as "Lebanese Christian Nationalism." Phares identification of the group is based on the formation of a mainly Aramaic-speaking ethnic group in Mount Lebanon as of the 7th century AD/CE, inheriting the ancient Phoenicians who settled Lebanon for the previous 3,000 years or more. The Mount Lebanon Aramaic homeland (Tur-Lebnon) developed a resistance to the Arab Conquests of the 7th century AD/CE known as the Marada (or Mardaites). Phares summarize the resistance of the Marada states from 676 AD/CE till circa 1305 AD/CE, who according to their own historians (Ibn al Qalai) have been able to withstand the pressures and invasions of the Umayyads, Abbasids and other Arab Islamic dynasties until the Mameluks invaded Mount Lebanon in the 14th century followed by the Ottomans in the 16th.

Under the Ottoman rule of Lebanon (1516-1919 AD/CE), the Lebanese Christians allied themselves with the Druze and formed a principality in a larger Mount Lebanon. Two wars in Mount Lebanon in 1840 and 1860 ended with the re-emergence of an autonomous mostly Christian-Druze entity known as Mutasarrifia (1862-1914).

The author analyzes the formation of a Greater Lebanon in 1920 with Christians and Muslims becoming the two main ethno-national groups of the country: The Christians with an Aramaic Mediterranean identity and the Muslims with an Arab identity. In 1943 a "National Pact" between the two groups attempted to create a "hybrid" identity: "Lebanon with an Arab face." Between 1945 and 1975, the binational country flourished economically but tensions remained high with the formation of the Arab League, the Arab-Israeli Conflict, the first Lebanese civil war of 1958, the 1967 war, the rise of the PLO in Lebanon as of 1968, the first clashes of the early 1970s until the explosion of the 1975 full-scale war between Lebanese Christian resistance and Lebanese Muslim militias and Palestinian forces. The Syrians engaged in a confrontation with the Lebanese Christians as of 1977. The Israeli invasion of 1982, created a new balance of power which lasted till 1990.

Phares argues that an intra Lebanese Christian civil war in 1990 ended the Lebanese Christian resistance and opened the path for a full scale Syrian occupation of the country.

== See also ==
- Lebanese nationalism
