= True Believer: The Rise and Fall of Stan Lee =

2021 biography of Stan Lee written by Josephine Riesman

- Author: Josephine Riesman
- Language: English
- Published: 2021
- Publisher: Penguin Random House
- Publication place: United States
- Media type: Print
- Pages: 416
- ISBN: 978-0-593-13571-6

True Believer: The Rise and Fall of Stan Lee is a biography of Stan Lee written by Josephine Riesman.

== Content ==
Lee, who died in 2018, was a comic book writer, editor, and publisher. Riesman, a comic book fan, had previously written a number of articles about comic books for Vulture.com, and her profile of Lee went viral. The article concerning, in part, the degree of input Lee had in the creation of Marvel Comics superheroes during the Silver Age of Comic Books.

True Believer was written as a followup and is a full biography of Lee's life. For the biography, Riesman interviewed Lee's surviving family members, former coworkers and business partners, and assistants who worked with his collaborators. Riesman said the book was not intended to be a hatchet job but instead examines controversies in the comic book business, many of which have no proof either way, such as who created which characters. This is partly because the history of early comic book companies was not preserved, and partly because the Marvel Method of comic book creation left authorship murky.

== Reception ==
=== Media interest ===
Publishers Weekly called it a "detailed, clear-eyed examination" of interest to general audiences. Stephanie Burt of The New Yorker described it as a künstlerroman that tackles a story that has become increasingly relevant to mainstream audiences who are not comics fans because of the billions of dollars involved in the Marvel Cinematic Universe. Andy Lewis of the Los Angeles Times said it is "a well-researched, engrossing and compulsively readable book" but felt it focuses too much on scandalmongering and criticizing Lee. Writing for USA Today, Barbara VanDenburgh said that the book "doesn't read like a takedown" and is an "absorbing read" even for non-comics fans. Mike Avila of IGN wrote that it "offers an illuminating and often harsh look" at Lee, and Glen David Gold of The Washington Post called it an "excellent dig below the geniality that shows casual fans who he really was". Jillian Steinhauer wrote in The New Republic that the book is "well-researched and thorough" but "feels like it's missing an emotional core".

=== Response by Roy Thomas ===
Roy Thomas, a former editor-in-chief at Marvel and protégé of Lee, commented on the biography in an opinion piece. Thomas described it as "95% true", but containing lies of omission. He cited the existence of partial outlines written by Lee, for Fantastic Four #1 and #8, respectively, which go over the plot-lines for the stories in some detail. (Thomas dismissed the idea that Lee might have written the outlines after rather than before the publication of the stories, in order to claim false credit.) Thomas also faulted Riesman for taking Kirby's statement at face value but not Lee's. Thomas considered the flaws, together, rendered the book untrustworthy. Thomas published a revised and expanded critique in issue #171 of Alter Ego, a publication which Thomas edits. Here, Thomas went into more detail regarding the biography's perceived inaccuracies.
