= Harold Aram Veeser =

American professor of English

- Known for: Contributions to the theory of new historicism

Academic background
- Education: Columbia University (BA, PhD)
- Doctoral advisor: Edward Said

Academic work
- Discipline: Literary studies
- Institutions: City College of New York

Harold Aram Veeser (born November 3, 1950) is an American professor of English at City College of New York, best known for his founding role as a theorist of new historicism, in addition to his contributions to the historiography of postcolonial theory.

He holds a BA, MA, and PhD in English and Comparative Literature from Columbia University, where he studied under the supervision of postcolonial theorist Edward Said.

Since 1997 he has been employed at the City College of New York where he teaches courses on postcolonialism, biography and autobiography, 17th century British poetry, modern and contemporary British literature.

== Major works ==
In 2010, Veeser published a biography of Said, which combines " never-before-published interviews, debate transcripts, and photographs" with short personal anecdotes. Derided as "hagiography" in a review published by the American conservative think tank Middle East Forum, other reviewers have been more positive, finding it to be a "corrective to some of the more fawning tributes that have appeared in recent years," drawing comparisons to Robert Irwin's more openly critical analysis of Said's work, Dangerous Knowledge: Orientalism and Its Discontents.

Prior to his work on Said, Veeser was primarily known for his literary and art criticism, collected in a number of influential collections of literary criticism, in addition to popular magazines and academic journals, including The Nation Magazine, The Journal of Armenian Studies, Ararat, and Armenian Forum.

== Major publications in chronological order ==
- The New Historicism (Editor) (1989). Veeser, H. Aram, editor. The New Historicism. Routledge, 1989.
- The New Historicism Reader (Editor) (1994). Veeser, H. Aram, editor. The New Historicism Reader. Routledge, 1994.
- Confessions of the Critics (Editor) (1996). Veeser, H. Aram, editor. Confessions of the Critic. Routledge, 1996.
- The Stanley Fish Reader (Editor) (1999). Fish, Stanley Eugene and H. Aram Veeser, editors. The Stanley Fish Editor. Blackwell Publishers, 1999.
- Ken Aptekar: Painting between the Lines (2001). Veeser, H. Aram. “Judgment, Rescue, and the Realignment of Painting.” Painting Between The Lines, 1990–2000. Edited by Ken Aptekar, Kemper Museum of Contemporary Art, 2001, pp 49–77.
- The Politics of Autobiography in North American Criticism (2007). Veeser, H. Aram. “The Politics of Autobiography in North American Criticism.” vol. 7, no. 3, pp. 13–77, 2007.
- Edward Said: The Charisma of Criticism (2010), Veeser, H. Aram. Edward Said: The Charisma of Criticism. Routledge, 2010.

The Rebirth of American Literary Theory and Criticism: Scholars Discuss Intellectual Origins and Turning Points. Anthem, 2020. "The Postcolonial Interview."(Editor)(2024). Special issue of The Journal of Postcolonial Writing 60.4 (August 2024). "Said's Worldliness." In Theory as World Literature (Bloomsbury 2025) pp 205–220.

== Bibliography ==
- Veeser, ed. The New Historicism, (Routledge, Chapman and Hall) 1989, "Introduction", p. xi. Nineteen essays by contributors.
- Veeser, Harold. The Politics of Autobiography in North American Criticism https://www.brunel.ac.uk/__data/assets/pdf_file/0020/187211/ET73VeeserED.pdf ???
- Veeser, Harold. "Said and Me — H. Aram Veeser." Politics and Culture 2004 (2010): n. pag. Web.
- Veeser, Harold. http://haroldveeser.com

== Sources ==
- David Mikics, ed. A New Handbook of Literary Terms, 2007, s.v. "New historicism".
