= The Keys of This Blood =

Book by Malachi Martin

- First edition
- Author: Malachi Martin
- Language: English
- Genre: Non-fiction
- Publisher: Simon & Schuster
- Publication date: 1990

The Keys of This Blood is a 1990 non-fiction geopolitical book by former Catholic Jesuit priest Malachi Martin.

== Content ==
Martin wrote this book as a geopolitical and georeligious analysis of the last decades of the 20th century. He identifies this period as the millennium end-game for a new world order, which has three main contenders. It will establish the first ever one-world government. Pope John Paul II, Mikhail Gorbachev, and international business leaders are in competition to establish this one world government and that this competition will intensify around the turn of the 21st century (around 2000). The book further claims to be an inside account of what the pope is doing to win this geopolitical struggle and how he played an instrumental role in the collapse of the Iron Curtain.

Martin identifies the three main players vying for world domination in the world today and thus lays the ground for his historical analysis: materialism with the East and West in their communism or socialism and capitalism or liberalism, which he places on one side together, and the Roman Catholic Church, the only truly geopolitical spiritual organization in existence today. One of the two sides must win, for they cannot coexist.

Martin introduces the concept of superforce in the book. Superforce is the unofficial name given by Martin for a more or less formal group of people within the hierarchy of the Catholic Church (82). Martin claimed that this superforce is a sort of ecclesiastical version of a hostile takeover team in the corporate world, and furthermore Martin said the superforce was made up of churchmen of such rank and power at key positions within the hierarchical Vatican that they exerted critical control over the church globally. The goal of this organisation consist in a fundamental shift in church teachings.

The book was translated into Spanish, Polish and German.
