= Walid Phares =

Lebanese-American academic (born 1957)

- وليد فارس
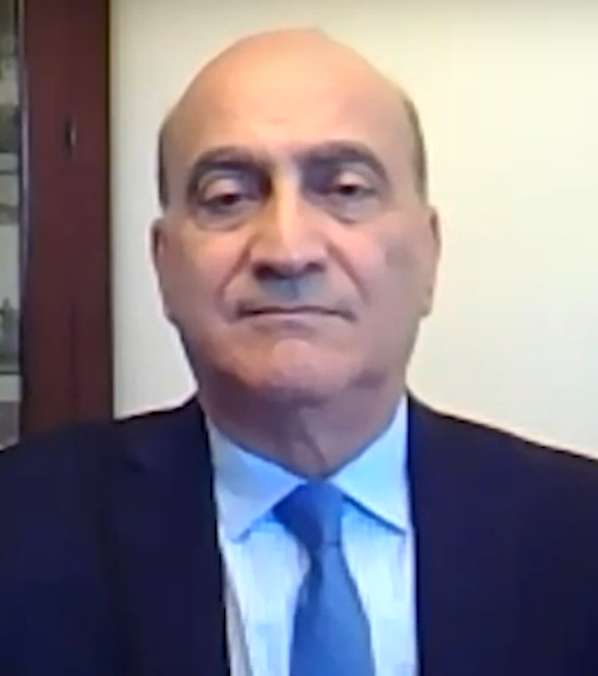
- Phares in 2021
- Born: December 24, 1957 (age 68); Batroun, Lebanon
- Citizenship: Lebanon; United States
- Education: Lebanese University (LLB); Saint Joseph University (BA); University of Lyon (LLM); University of Miami (PhD)
- Occupations: Politician; scholar
- Notable work: Lebanese Christian Nationalism: The Rise and Fall of an Ethnic Resistance (1995); Future Jihad: Terrorist Strategies Against America (2005)
- Political party: Kataeb Party (c. 1984–1990); Republican Party (c. 2012–present)
- Walid Phares' voice Phares on Egypt's Interior minister assassination attempt, 5 September 2013

Walid Phares (Arabic: وليد فارس; born December 24, 1957) is a Lebanese-American political advisor, scholar and conservative pundit.

He worked as an advisor for the Republican presidential campaigns of Mitt Romney in 2011–12 and Donald Trump in 2016. He has also served as a commentator on terrorism and the Middle East for Fox News since 2007, and for NBC from 2003 to 2006. Since 2022, he has been a foreign policy analyst for Newsmax.

A Maronite Christian, Phares has gained attention for having been a chairman of the Social Democratic Party in Lebanon in the 1980s during the Lebanese Civil War, and for his expertise in counterterrorism with a focus on jihadism.

== Early life and education ==
Phares was born to a family of Maronite Christians in 1957 in Lebanon, and was raised in the capital city of Beirut and in his native village of Ghouma in the Batroun District. A dual Lebanese and American citizen, he immigrated to the United States in 1990, when the Lebanese Civil War was coming to a close.

He holds joint undergraduate degrees from Saint Joseph University and the Lebanese University in law, political science, and sociology. Following his undergraduate studies, Phares practiced law in Beirut for a short period before earning a master's degree in international law from the Jean Moulin University Lyon 3 in France and a PhD in international relations and strategic studies from the University of Miami.

== Career ==
=== Lebanese politics in the 1980s ===
Phares has drawn controversy over his association with the Social Democratic Party in the 1980s during the Lebanese Civil War. In 1984, Phares adhered to a small Lebanese political party of the center-left, the "Social Democratic Christian Union" – Union Sociale Démocratique Chrétienne (USDC). Phares has also served as secretary general of the World Maronite Union, and secretary general of the World Lebanese Cultural Union. According to The Washington Post, Phares "was a political adviser to Lebanese militants during their war against Muslim factions during the 1980s." Phares has said that he was only involved with the militants in a political capacity and that he has not been directly implicated in any acts of violence.

Abed Ayoub, the national legal and policy director for the American-Arab Anti-Discrimination Committee, criticizes Phares saying: "If you look at his history, he was a warmonger and he shouldn't be near the White House. He was part of a militia that committed war crimes and, if anything, he should be tried for war crimes." Sarah Stern, president of the pro-IsraelEndowment for Middle East Truth think tank, defended his actions: "He represented his left-of-center party within a coalition of parties that oversaw the local government of the Christian community when it was surrounded by the Syrian army and the terrorist groups between 1986 and 1988. Phares is being attacked because he is on the right side of the issues and is fearless in speaking out the truth... [Walid] is in a caliber of his own. He understood the rise of radical Islam in the Middle East. He understood very early on what ISIS is, that it's a real threat. He understands that Islam is more than a religion, that it's also an ideology and an ideology of conquest."

=== Academia in the United States ===
Phares taught at the Department of International Relations at Florida International University (FIU) in 1992 and was a visiting professor of comparative politics at Florida Atlantic University (FAU) in Palm Beach County from 1993 to 1994. He was hired as a full-time professor of Middle East studies and international relations in the Department of Political Science at FAU in 1995. While at FAU, Phares sponsored the student organization Haiti Watch. In 2008 he became Coordinator of the Trans-Atlantic Parliamentary Group on Counter Jihadi-Terrorism. Since 2008, he has lectured at the National Intelligence University in Washington DC, at the Center for Counterintelligence and Security Studies (CI Center) in Virginia, and at the Daniel Morgan Academy, a Graduate School of National Security in Washington DC. He teaches at BAU International University in Washington, D.C. also serving as a university provost and as Director of Graduate Studies at the university.

Phares's resume says that he "taught Global Strategies at the National Defense University in Washington DC since 2006". A spokesperson for the National Defense University noted that Phares was employed as an "expert/consultant" from April 2011 to April 2012.

Phares has testified before committees of the U.S. State, Justice, Defense and Homeland Security and the United States Congress. He briefed and testified to international bodies like the European Parliament and the United Nations Security Council on matters related to international security and Middle East conflict. He serves as an adviser to the Anti-Terrorism Caucus in the U.S. House of Representatives since 2007 and is a co-secretary general of the Transatlantic Legislative Group on Counter Terrorism, a Euro-American Caucus, since 2009. He has served on the advisory board of the Task Force on Future Terrorism of the Department of Homeland Security in 2006–2007 as well as on the Advisory Task force on Nuclear Terrorism in 2007. He lectures at defense and national security institutions and serves as a consultant on international affairs in the private sector.

=== Advisor to Mitt Romney, 2011–12 ===
Phares was appointed as foreign policy adviser to Mitt Romney for his 2012 presidential campaign in 2011. His appointment was met with criticism from the Council on American–Islamic Relations (CAIR), which described him as "an associate to war crimes" (due to his ties to the Lebanese Forces) and a "conspiracy theorist". The appointment also provoked negative reactions from Islamic studies academics Ebrahim Moosa and Omid Safi, however both scholars were described as militant Islamists by several pieces, including "Walid Phares vs the Middle East Studies" as well as the Center for a New American Security's Andrew Exum, who said that Phares was "widely viewed as an extremist".

=== Advisor to Donald Trump, 2016 ===
Phares worked as an advisor to presidential candidate Donald Trump in 2016; he was paid $13,000 per month by the campaign. Trump's choice of Phares renewed scrutiny and speculations about Phares' past alleged role as an ideologue to Lebanese Christian fighters during the Lebanese Civil War and his perceived far-right views as an academic and analyst of the Middle East region. His supporters argued that Phares had presciently discerned the threat of jihadist ideology and that he was eminently qualified for a senior post, and pointed to his strong pro-Israel track record.

Phares did not have a government post in the Trump administration.

== Views ==
=== On the Arab–Israeli conflict ===
Phares has said that "[Israel's] only rational and historical choice is to link up once more with the Christian community of Lebanon. This may represent a choice which may not be appreciated among many Israelis, for various reasons, but it remains one which cannot be avoided... The Christians of Lebanon are the only potential ally against the advance of the northern Arabo-Islamic threat against Israel."

=== On Islam and Muslims ===
According to The New York Times, Phares "regularly warns that Muslims aim to take over American institutions and impose Sharia, a legal code based mainly on the Quran that can involve punishments like cutting off the hands of a thief." He has been described as an early advocate of Bat Ye'or's dhimmitude concept. Phares has also asserted that jihadists are posing as civil rights advocates.

Phares has been described as being part of "the Islamophobia industry, a network of researchers who have warned for many years of the dangers of Islam and were thrilled by Mr. Trump’s election." He has served on the board of advisors of anti-Muslim groups ACT for America and the Clarion Project. According to Lawrence Pintak of the Atlantic Council and a member of the advisory board for The Media Majlis at Northwestern University in Qatar, Phares is a "card-carrying Islamophobe". Although Phares is often described as a scholar on terrorism, Stanford University terrorism expert Martha Crenshaw stated that Phares was "not in the mainstream as an academic". Duke sociologist Christopher A. Bail describes Phares as an influential figure in the anti-Islam movement. He has also been described as a part of the counter-jihad movement.

According to The New York Times, Phares "is regularly accused by Muslim civil rights groups of being Islamophobic and of fear-mongering about the spread of Sharia law."

=== Conspiracy theory on Obama–Muslim Brotherhood ties ===
Phares has asserted that the Barack Obama administration supported the Muslim Brotherhood. In October 2016, he asserted that "the triangle Clintonmachine-Iranregime-MuslimBrotherhood has unleashed a coordinated propaganda offensive" against Donald Trump.

=== Reaction to the 2017 Westminster terrorist attack ===
In March 2017 Phares attracted attention in the UK when he implied in a tweet that London had "shut down" in the wake of the terrorist attack in Westminster, despite most roads and tube stations (with the exception of the adjacent Westminster station) remaining open as normal, and the fact that only the immediate crime scene was cordoned off: many Londoners replied to Phares to refute his claim.

== Published works ==
référence : Jean-Marc Aractingi, La politique à mes trousses, Paris, Éditions l'Harmattan, 2006 (ISBN 978-2-296-00469-6)

Year	Book	Publisher
1979	Pluralism in Lebanon	Holy Spirit University of Kaslik
1980	The Lebanese Thought and the Thesis of Arabization	Dar el-Sharq Press
1981	Democratic Dialogue	Manshurat el-Tagammoh
1985	Thirteen Centuries of Struggle	Mashreq Editions (Beirut)
1986	The Iranian Islamic Revolution	Dar el-Sharq Press
1995	Lebanese Christian Nationalism: The Rise and Fall of an Ethnic Resistance	L. Rienner Publishers
1998, 2001	History of the Middle East: Trends and Benchmarks	IRP University of Miami Press
2005	Future Jihad: Terrorist Strategies Against America	Palgrave Macmillan
2007	The War of Ideas: Jihadism against Democracy	Palgrave Macmillan
2008	The Confrontation: Winning the War against Future Jihad	Palgrave Macmillan
2010	The Coming Revolution: Struggle for Freedom in the Middle East	Simon & Schuster
2014	The Lost Spring. U.S. Policy in the Middle East and Catastrophes to Avoid	Palgrave Macmillan
