= Rise and Fall =

Rise and Fall or Rise & Fall may refer to:

== Music ==
- Rise and Fall (band), a Belgian hardcore band

=== Songs ===
- "Rise & Fall" (Justice Crew song), 2014
- "Rise & Fall" (Craig David song), 2003 song by Craig David featuring Sting
- "Rise & Fall" (Michael Molloy and Alex Evans song), 2013
- "Rise and Fall", song from the Offspring's 2008 album Rise and Fall, Rage and Grace

=== Albums ===
- Rise and Fall (Dargaard album), 2004
- Rise and Fall (Tim Halperin album), 2011
- Rise and Fall (Warlocks album), 2001
- Rise & Fall (album), 2024 album by Scotty McCreery
- The Rise & Fall, a 1982 album by Madness

== Games ==
- Rise and Fall: Civilizations at War, 2006 computer game
- Civilization VI: Rise and Fall, 2018 expansion pack for Civilization VI

== Other uses ==
- Rise and Fall (TV series), 2023 UK reality television series
- Rise and Fall (Indian TV series), 2025 Indian reality television series
- Rises and falls, category of ballroom dance techniques

== See also ==
- The Rise and Fall of, a snowclone
- Rise or Fall (album)
