= American Tuna =

2012 non-fiction book by Andrew F. Smith

First edition

American Tuna: The Rise and Fall of an Improbable Food is a 2012 non-fiction book by Andrew F. Smith, published by the University of California Press.

The work describes how tuna became a popular food in the United States, and how its popularity ebbed.
