= The Rise and Fall of Bossanova =

The Rise and Fall of Bossanova (A 13:23:32 Song)

Studio album by P C III
- Released: November 1, 2016
- Genre: Onistwave
- Length: 13:23:32
- Label: Pipe Choir
- Producer: Michael J. Bostwick

P C III chronology
Ad Astra, Vol. 3 (2016)	The Rise and Fall of Bossanova (A 13:23:32 Song) (2016)	Music for a Weary World, Vol. 1 (2017)

Audio
- “The Rise and Fall of Bossanova Section I” on YouTube

The Rise and Fall of Bossanova (A 13:23:32 Song) is the fifth album by Michael J Bostwick for his musical project Pipe Choir Three (abbreviated P C III). It was released on November 1, 2016, through the Creative Commons independent label Pipe Choir.

Despite being broken up into five tracks, the entire album is one continuous song. The album held the Guinness World Record from 2016 to 2020 as the longest song officially released.

== Track listing ==
No.	Title	Length
1.	"The Rise and Fall of Bossanova Section I"	2:11:20
2.	"The Rise and Fall of Bossanova Section II"	2:57:54
3.	"The Rise and Fall of Bossanova Section III"	1:54:10
4.	"The Rise and Fall of Bossanova Section IV"	4:20:54
5.	"The Rise and Fall of Bossanova Section V"	1:59:13
Total length:		13:23:34
