= Tom Clark (poet) =

American poet, editor, and biographer (1941–2018)

- Born: Thomas Willard Clark; March 1, 1941; Chicago, Illinois, U.S.
- Died: August 18, 2018 (aged 77)
- Education: Fenwick High School; University of Michigan; Gonville and Caius College, Cambridge
- Occupations: Poet; editor; biographer
- Spouse: Angelica Heinegg (m. 1968)

Thomas Willard Clark (March 1, 1941 – August 18, 2018) was an American poet, editor, and biographer.

== Education and personal life ==
Clark was born on the Near West Side of Chicago, and attended Fenwick High School in Oak Park. After high school, he attended the University of Michigan, where he received a Hopwood Award for poetry. He then won a Fulbright Scholarship to undertake graduate study at Gonville and Caius College, Cambridge in England (1963–5), before spending further time pursuing doctoral research (on the advice of Donald Davie) at the newly established University of Essex. It was while in Britain that Clark famously hitchhiked through Somerset in the company of Allen Ginsberg.

On March 22, 1968, he married Angelica Heinegg, at St. Mark's Church in-the-Bowery, New York City.

== Career ==
Clark was poetry editor of The Paris Review from 1963 to 1973, and published numerous volumes of poetry with Black Sparrow Press, including a verse biography: Junkets on a Sad Planet: Scenes from the Life of John Keats (1994). His literary essays and reviews appeared in The New York Times, The Times Literary Supplement, Los Angeles Times, San Francisco Chronicle, London Review of Books, and many other journals. Some of his essays on contemporary poetry were collected in The Poetry Beat: Reviewing the Eighties. From 1987 to 2008, he taught poetics at New College of California.

Residing in California for the remainder of his life, Clark was an active writer, producing poetry, fiction, and nonfiction. In 1991, he published a biography of Charles Olson, one of his poetic mentors, titled Charles Olson: The Allegory of a Poet’s Life (Norton: 1991).

== Death ==
On the evening of Friday, August 17, 2018, Clark was walking across a street in Berkeley, California, and was hit by a car at about 8:40 p.m. He died on the following day.

== Bibliography ==
=== Poetry collections ===
- Stones. Harper & Row. 1969.
- Air. Harper & Row. 1970.
- Green. Black Sparrow Press. March 26, 1971. ISBN 978-0876850817.
- Smack. Black Sparrow Press. December 1972.
- Blue. Black Sparrow Press. August 1974. ISBN 978-0876851838.
- Fan Poems. North Atlantic Books. 1976. ISBN 978-0913028452.
- When Things Get Tough on Easy Street. Black Sparrow Press. 1978. ISBN 978-0876853498.
- A Short Guide to the High Plains, For Ed Dorn. Cadmus Editions. November 1980. ISBN 978-0932274175.
- Paradise Resisted: Selected Poems 1978-1984. Black Sparrow Press. May 1, 1984. ISBN 978-0876856116.
- The Border: Poem and Drawings. Coffee House Press. 1985. ISBN 0918273064.
- Disordered Ideas. Black Sparrow Press. June 1, 1987. ISBN 978-0876856956.
- Easter Sunday: Selected Poems 1962 and 1987. Coffee House Press. October 1, 1987. ISBN 978-0918273277.
- Fractured Karma. Black Sparrow Press. February 1990. ISBN 978-0876857939.
- Sleepwalkers Fate: New and Selected Poems, 1965-1991. Black Sparrow Press. June 1992. ISBN 978-0876858707.
- Junkets on a Sad Planet: Scenes from the Life of John Keats. Black Sparrow Press. January 1, 1994. ISBN 978-0876859186.
- Like Real People. Black Sparrow Press. October 1, 1995. ISBN 978-0876859841.
- White Thought. Hard Press. 1997. ISBN 978-8890972096.
- Empire of Skin. Black Sparrow Press. November 1997. ISBN 978-1574230512.
- Light and Shade: New and Selected Poems. Coffee House Press. April 1, 2006. ISBN 978-1566891837.
- Threnody. effing press. 2006.
- Trans/Versions. Libellum Books. January 1, 2010. ISBN 978-0975299388.
- The New World. Libellum Books. January 1, 2010. ISBN 978-0975299371.
- Feeling For The Ground. BlazeVOX Books. February 11, 2010. ISBN 978-1935402961.
- Something In The Air. Shearsman Books. March 15, 2010. ISBN 978-1848611085.
- At The Fair. BlazeVOX Books. June 21, 2011. ISBN 978-1609640446.
- Canyonesque. BlazeVOX Books. September 16, 2011. ISBN 978-1609640712.
- Distance. BlazeVOX Books. April 6, 2012. ISBN 978-1609640972.
- Truth Game. BlazeVOX Books. July 10, 2013. ISBN 978-1609641443.
- Evening Train. BlazeVOX Books. July 11, 2014. ISBN 978-1609641870.
- Ride. Flow Press. May 25, 2017. ISBN 978-0998735719.

=== Literary biography ===
- The World of Damon Runyon. Harper & Row. 1978. ISBN 978-0060107710.
- The Great Naropa Poetry Wars. Cadmus Editions. 1980. ISBN 978-0932274069.
- Late Returns: A Memoir of Ted Berrigan. Tombouctou Books. 1985. ISBN 978-0939180356.
- Kerouac's Last Word: Jack Kerouac in Escapade. Water Row Books. February 1987. ISBN 978-0934953078.
- Jack Kerouac: A Biography. Paragon House. December 1990. ISBN 978-1557783080.
- Charles Olson: The Allegory of a Poet's Life. W. W. Norton & Company. April 1991. ISBN 978-0393029581.
- Robert Creeley and the Genius of the American Common Place: Together with the Poet's Own Autobiography. New Directions. November 1, 1993. ISBN 978-0811212502.
- Edward Dorn: A World of Difference. North Atlantic Books. March 21, 2002. ISBN 978-1556433979.
- Jim Carroll. Longhouse Press. 2010. ASIN B003AONG7W.

=== Fiction ===
- The Master. Pentagram Press. 1979.
- Who Is Sylvia?. Blue Wind Press. 1979.
- The Last Gas Station & Other Stories. Black Sparrow Press. June 1, 1980. ISBN 978-0876854563.
- Heartbreak Hotel. Toothpaste Press. 1981. ISBN 978-0915124572.
- The Exile of Céline. Random House. Jan 12, 1987. ISBN 978-0394553122.
- The Spell: A Romance. Black Sparrow Press. Jan 1, 2000. ISBN 978-1574231243.

=== Essays on Poetry ===
- The Poetry Beat: Reviewing the Eighties. University of Michigan Press. September 1990. ISBN 978-0472094288.
- Problems of Thought: Paradoxical Essays. Effing/Skanky Possum. 2009.

=== Other books by Clark ===
- Champagne and Baloney: The Rise and Fall of Finley's A's. Harper & Row. 1976. ISBN 978-0060108328.
- No Big Deal: Mark Fidrych Interviewed by Tom Clark. Lippincott. 1977. ISBN 978-0397012336.
- In the Shadow of the Capitol: Photographs by Carl Mydans for the U.S. Resettlement Administration, September 1935. Pataphysics Books, 2012. 2002. ISBN 978-0987338709.
