= Champagne and Baloney =

1976 book by Tom Clark

Champagne and Baloney: The Rise and Fall of Finley's A's
- First edition
- Author: Tom Clark
- Language: English
- Genre: Nonfiction
- Published: 1976
- Publisher: Harper & Row
- Publication place: United States
- Pages: 432
- ISBN: 0060108320

Champagne and Baloney: The Rise and Fall of Finley's A's is a nonfiction book by poet Tom Clark, published in 1976. It chronicles the ups and downs of Charles O. Finley's Oakland Athletics, who won three World Series, in 1972, 1973, and 1974, before falling apart.

The book includes portraits of players and team affiliates, drawn by the author. Champagne and Baloney was one of many baseball books written by Clark.

== Critical reception ==
The book earned mostly strong reviews. The New York Times wrote that "Mr. Clark puts the mess that Finley has made into narrative order. Then there is Mr. Clark's rollicking present-tense narrative, which is so breezy that it's gusty." Kirkus Reviews opined that "Clark has plenty of wit and sarcasm to unloose on Finley's 'preternatural talent for antagonizing people.'" Journal of Sport History called it "a highly readable narrative" and thought that it was better than Herb Michelson's then-recent The Mustache Gang. Ron Padgett, in The Poetry Project Newsletter, declared that the book "is an eminently likeable and occasionally brilliant quick read. On the surface a detailed account of the Oakland Athletics, it is also an exposition of the author's affection for baseball and writing." A dissenter, Greil Marcus, writing for Rolling Stone, thought that the book worked best as a play-by-play analysis of the team.
