= Josephine Riesman =

American reporter and essayist

- Born: 1985 (age 40–41); Oak Park, Illinois, U.S.
- Education: Harvard University (AB)
- Occupations: Reporter, Essayist
- Spouse: S.I. Rosenbaum
- Writing career
- Notable work: True Believer: The Rise and Fall of Stan Lee
- Website: josie.zone

Josephine Riesman (born 1985) is an American reporter and essayist based in Providence, Rhode Island. She is the author of three biographies, True Believer: The Rise and Fall of Stan Lee (2021), Ringmaster: Vince McMahon and the Unmaking of America (2023), and The Last Temptation of Beck (2026).

== Background and education ==
Riesman was born and raised in Oak Park, Illinois, a suburb of Chicago. She graduated from Harvard College in 2008. After college, she moved to New York City, where she lived for 12 years before moving to Providence, Rhode Island. She has contributed to a variety of publications, including The New York Times, The Washington Post, and The Wall Street Journal.

== Career ==
In 2017, Riesman published her first book, True Believer: The Rise and Fall of Stan Lee. The book is a biography of Stan Lee, the comic book writer, editor, and publisher who is best known for creating Marvel Comics superheroes such as Spider-Man, the X-Men, and the Hulk.

Riesman's second book, Ringmaster: Vince McMahon and the Unmaking of America, was published in 2023. The book is a biography of Vince McMahon, the professional wrestling promoter who is the chairman and CEO of WWE. Ringmaster was a New York Times bestseller, and was described in the New York Times as "magisterial."

Riesman has contributed as a freelance journalist and essayist to numerous publications, including New York Magazine, The Washington Post, Slate, and The Daily Beast.

Her latest book The Last Temptation of Beck was published in October 2026, about Beck's rise as a 1990s alternative rock icon, his relationship with the Church of Scientology, his musical shifts, and the mechanics of modern pop fame.

== Personal life ==
Riesman is transgender. She is married to the journalist S.I. Rosenbaum. They live in Providence, Rhode Island.
