= The Decline and Fall of the Roman Church =

1981 book by Malachi Martin

- Author: Malachi Martin
- Publisher: Putnam
- Publication date: 1981

The Decline and Fall of the Roman Church is a 1981 non-fiction book by Catholic priest and author Malachi Martin.

== Content ==
Martin wrote this book to analyse the sudden and rapid decline of the Roman Catholic Church in its ecclesiastical organization and doctrinal unity since the Second Vatican Council (1962–1965).

The book is an account of the history of the Roman Catholic Church progressing from the earliest beginnings and Roman Emperor Constantine the Great's relationship with the church during the reign of Pope Silvester I up through the post Vatican II popes and Pope John Paul II.

Martin shows the transformations that took place in the institution of the papacy as the relationship between temporal power and spiritual authority was worked out throughout the years. Martin tells how the early popes were chosen, including how many were appointed by secular rulers until the invention of the conclave.

The last two chapters of the book—concerning popes Pius XII and John Paul II—give background information on recent papal history from Martin's perspective. The Pius XII chapter contains information on both the pope's encounter with Marxism and his visionary life. Martin, was a protégé to Pius' confidant and confessor, cardinal Augustine Bea, who was the source for this information.

The book was translated into Spanish, French and German.

== Reception ==
Reviews of the book noted its controversial character. Kirkus Reviews called it a "Vivid, impressionistic, chimerical history of the papacy" and concluded that it was "Lively stuff, certainly, but rife with distortions." Christopher Small of the Glasgow Herald characterized it as a "highly dramatised, not to say sensational, tour through the history of the papacy", the author's main purpose being to depict what he sees as the church's long and problematic association with state power. On the other hand, National Catholic Reporter journalist Peter Hebblethwaite found parts of the book to be "incoherent" and "dogmatic" and wrote that Martin "seems to be making it all up".
