= Malachi Martin =

Irish-American Catholic priest, exorcist, and writer (1921–1999)

The Reverend Malachi Brendan Martin
- Born: 23 July 1921; Ballylongford, County Kerry, Ireland
- Died: 27 July 1999 (aged 78); New York City, U.S.
- Occupations: Biblical archaeologist Catholic priest Exorcist; Novelist; Professor; Theologian
- Relatives: F. X. Martin (brother) John Edmund Fitzmaurice (grand uncle, Bishop of Erie, USA) Edmond John Fitzmaurice (uncle, Bishop of Wilmington, USA)
- Writing career
- Pen name: Michael Serafian

Malachi Brendan Martin (23 July 1921 – 27 July 1999), also known under the pseudonym of Michael Serafian, was an Irish-born American Traditionalist Catholic priest, biblical archaeologist, exorcist, palaeographer, professor, and writer on the Catholic Church.

Ordained as a Jesuit, Martin became Professor of Palaeography at the Pontifical Biblical Institute in Rome. From 1958, he served as secretary to Cardinal Augustin Bea during preparations for the Second Vatican Council. Disillusioned by the council, Martin asked to be released from certain aspects of his Jesuit vows in 1964 and moved to New York City.

Martin's 17 novels and non-fiction books were frequently critical of the Catholic hierarchy, who he believed had failed to act on what he called "the Third Prophecy" revealed by the Virgin Mary at Fátima. His works included The Scribal Character of the Dead Sea Scrolls (1958) and Hostage to the Devil (1976), which dealt with Satanism, demonic possession, and exorcisms. The Final Conclave (1978) was a warning against Soviet espionage in the Vatican.

== Biography ==
=== Early life, education and ordination ===
Martin was born in Ballylongford, County Kerry, Ireland, to a middle-class family in which the children were raised speaking Irish at the dinner table. His parents, Conor and Katherine Fitzmaurice Martin, had five sons and five daughters. Four of the five sons became priests, including his younger brother, Francis Xavier Martin.

Martin attended Belvedere College in Dublin, then studied philosophy for three years at University College Dublin. On 6 September 1939, he became a novice with the Society of Jesus. Martin taught for three years, spending four years at Milltown Park, Dublin, and was ordained in August 1954.

Upon completion of his degree course in Dublin, Martin was sent to the Catholic University of Louvain in Belgium, where he took a doctorate in archaeology, Oriental history, and Semitic languages. He started postgraduate studies at both the Hebrew University of Jerusalem and at the University of Oxford. Martin specialized in intertestamentary studies, Jesus in Jewish and Islamic sources, Ancient Hebrew and Arabic manuscripts. He undertook additional study in rational psychology, experimental psychology, physics, and anthropology.

=== Work ===
Martin participated in the research on the Dead Sea Scrolls and published 24 articles on Semitic palaeography. He did archaeological research and worked extensively on the Byblos syllabary in Byblos, in Tyre, and in the Sinai Peninsula. Martin assisted in his first exorcism while working in Egypt for archaeological research. In 1958, he published a work in two volumes, The Scribal Character of the Dead Sea Scrolls.

Martin's years in Rome coincided with the beginning of the Second Vatican Council (1962–1965), which was to transform the Catholic Church in a way that the initially liberal Martin began to find distressing. He became friends with Monsignor George Gilmary Higgins and Father John Courtney Murray.

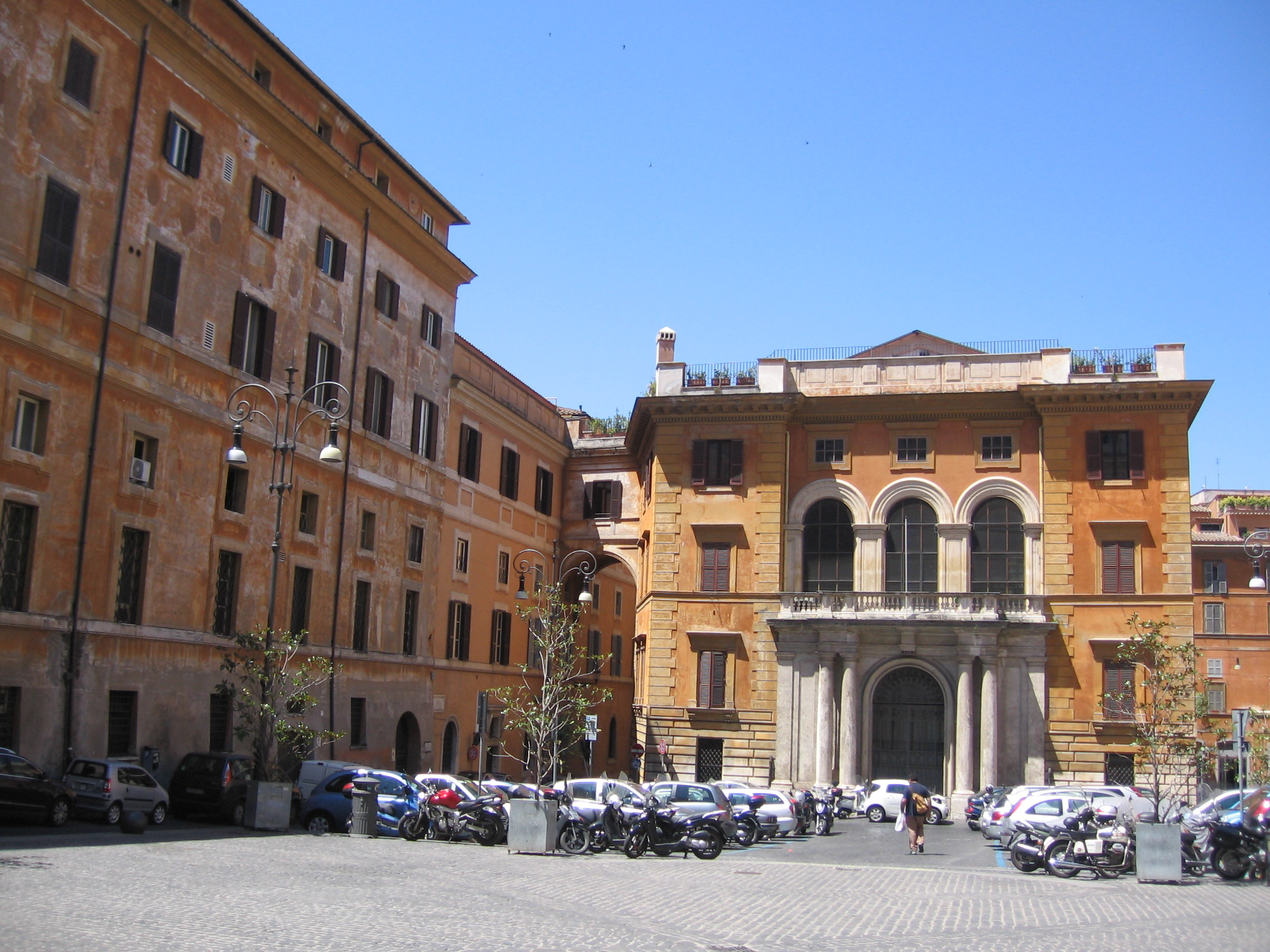
Biblical Institute of Rome

In Rome, Martin became a professor at the Pontifical Biblical Institute, where he taught Aramaic, Hebrew, palaeography, and Sacred Scripture. He also taught theology, part-time, at Loyola University Chicago's John Felice Rome Center. Martin worked as a translator for the Eastern Orthodox Churches and Ancient Oriental Churches Division of the Secretariat for Promoting Christian Unity under Bea. Martin became acquainted with Jewish leaders, such as Rabbi Abraham Joshua Heschel, in 1961 and 1962. Martin accompanied Pope Paul VI on a trip to Jordan in January 1964. He resigned his position at the Pontifical Institute in June 1964.

In 1964, Martin requested a release from his vows and from the Jesuit Order. He received a provisional release in May 1965 and a dispensation from his vows of poverty and obedience on 30 June 1965 (cf. qualified exclaustration). Even if dispensed from his religious vow of chastity, Martin remained under the obligation of chastity if still an ordained secular priest. Martin maintained that he remained a priest, saying that he had received a dispensation from Paul VI to that effect.

Martin moved to New York City in 1966, working as a dishwasher, a waiter, and taxi driver, while continuing to write. He co-founded an antiques firm and was active in communications and media for the rest of his life.

=== Communications and media ===
In 1967, Martin received his first Guggenheim Fellowship. In 1970, he published the book The Encounter: Religion in Crisis, winning the Choice Book Award of the American Library Association. He then published Three Popes and the Cardinal: The Church of Pius, John and Paul in its Encounter with Human History (1972) and Jesus Now (1973). In 1970, Martin became a naturalized U.S. citizen.

In 1969, Martin received a second Guggenheim Fellowship, allowing him to write his first of four bestsellers, Hostage to the Devil: The Possession and Exorcism of Five Living Americans (1976). In the book, Martin calls himself an exorcist, claiming he assisted in several exorcisms. According to McManus Darraugh, William Peter Blatty "wrote a tirade against Malachi, saying his 1976 book was a fantasy, and he was just trying to cash in." Darraugh also said that Martin became "an iconic person in the paranormal world."

Martin served as religious editor for the National Review from 1972 to 1978. He was interviewed twice by William F. Buckley, Jr. for Firing Line on PBS. He was an editor for the Encyclopædia Britannica.

Martin published several works of fiction and non-fiction in the following years:

- Hostage to the Devil: The Possession and Exorcism of Five Living Americans (1976)
- The Final Conclave (1978)
- King of Kings: a Novel of the Life of David (1980)
- Vatican: A Novel (1986)

His other works included:

- The Pilgrim (1964)
- The Encounter (1970)
- The Decline and Fall of the Roman Church (1981)
- The New Castle: Reaching for the Ultimate (1982)
- Rich Church, Poor Church: The Catholic Church and its Money (1984)
- There is Still Love: Five Parables of God's Love That Will Change Your Life (1984)

Martin's bestselling 1987 non-fiction book, The Jesuits: The Society of Jesus and the Betrayal of the Roman Catholic Church, was highly critical of the Jesuit Order, accusing the Jesuits of systematically undermining church teachings.

=== Later life ===
Martin was a periodic guest on Art Bell's radio program, Coast to Coast AM, between 1996 and 1998. The show continues to play tapes of his interviews on Halloween.

Martin's The Keys of This Blood: The Struggle for World Dominion between Pope John Paul II, Mikhail Gorbachev, and the Capitalist West was published in 1990. It was followed in 1996 by Windswept House: A Vatican Novel.

The Vatican restored Martin's faculty to celebrate Mass in 1989, at his request. He was strongly supported by some Traditionalist Catholic sources and severely criticized by other sources, such as the National Catholic Reporter. Martin served as a guest commentator for CNN during the live coverage of the visit of Pope John Paul II to the United States in October 1995.

=== Death ===
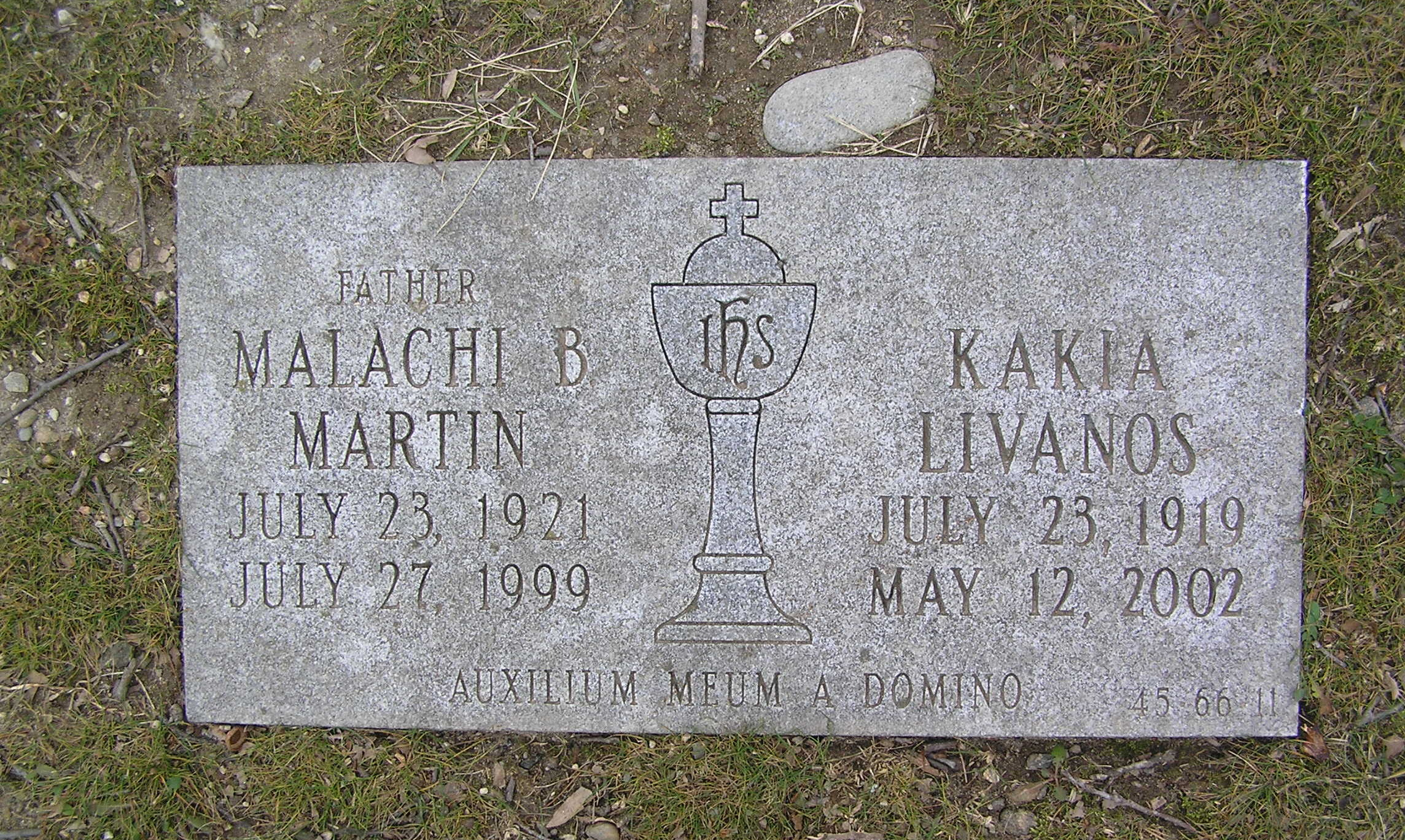
The footstone of Malachi Martin in Gate of Heaven Cemetery

In 1999, Malachi Martin died in Manhattan of an intracerebral haemorrhage.

Martin's funeral took place in St. Anthony of Padua Catholic Church in West Orange, New Jersey, before burial at Gate of Heaven Cemetery, in Hawthorne, New York.

== Work ==
=== Writings ===
In 1964, under the pseudonym of "Michael Serafian", Martin wrote The Pilgrim: Pope Paul VI, the Council, & the Church in a Time of Decision. The book contained Martin's views on the Jewish question in Europe and on the Second Vatican Council. Martin's fictional works purported to give detailed insider accounts of Church history during the reigns of Popes Pius XII, John XXIII, Paul VI (The Pilgrim, Three Popes and the Cardinal, Vatican: A Novel), John Paul I (The Final Conclave) and John Paul II (The Keys of This Blood, Windswept House).

=== Opinions ===
==== Three secrets of Fátima ====
Martin often spoke and wrote about the Three Secrets of Fátima and was an ardent supporter of Father Nicholas Gruner's interpretations of them: "Father Gruner is fulfilling a desperately needed function in the ongoing perception of Mary's role in the salvation of our imperilled world. Father Gruner is absolutely correct that the consecration of Russia as Our Lady desired, has not been executed". According to Martin, the unreleased third secret of Fatima was that the Soviet Union would be converted to Christianity. The Vatican released what it claimed to be the third secret letter in 2000. This text did not mention Russia or the Soviet Union.

==== Other theories ====
Martin did not believe in the alleged apparitions of the Virgin Mary at Međugorje in what is today Bosnia and Herzegovina. He said that false pretenses were used in obtaining earlier his recommendation. Concerning the Garabandal apparitions, he remained open minded.

In March 1997, Martin claimed on Radio Liberty's Steel on Steel, that two popes were murdered during the 20th century:

- Pope Pius XI was allegedly murdered by Benito Mussolini, because of his 1931 encyclical, Non abbiamo bisogno, which was critical of the Italian Fascist state.
- Pope John Paul I was allegedly murdered according to Martin's book, Vatican: A Novel, by Jean-Marie Villot, formerly Cardinal Secretary of State under Pope Paul VI, under orders from the Soviet Union.

Martin stated that, along with diabolic possession, angelic possession also exists and that angels could have use of preternatural powers in certain circumstances.

==== Siri theory ====
Martin partially gave credence to the Siri thesis, saying that Cardinal Giuseppe Siri was twice elected pope in papal conclaves, but declined his election after being pressured by so-called worldly forces acting through cardinals present at the conclaves. Martin called this the little brutality. On the one hand, Martin says that Siri was intimidated; on the other hand he says that Siri did indicate that his decision not to accept was made freely.

- The second election was the Papal conclave, October 1978. Martin said on Steel on Steel in March 1997, that Siri received a written note after his initial election threatening him and his family with death should he accept.

=== Freemasons ===
Martin claimed that John XXIII and Paul VI were Freemasons during a certain period and that photographs and other detailed documents proving this were in the possession of the Vatican State Secretariat. He allegorically mentioned these supposed facts in his 1986 novel Vatican: A Novel, where he related the Masonic adherence of Pope Giovanni Angelica and Giovanni De Brescia. Martin also claimed that Archbishop Annibale Bugnini was a Freemason and that Agostino Casaroli, long-time Cardinal Secretary of State, was an atheist.

=== Metz accord ===
In his 1987 book The Jesuits, Martin describes negotiations and a diplomatic agreement between the Vatican and the USSR named the "Moscow Vatican Pact of 1962" or the "Metz Pact". In this "little-known" agreement, the Vatican allegedly promised non-condemnation of Soviet Communism or Marxism in exchange for the participation of Russian-Orthodox prelates as observers at the Second Vatican Council. Description of this incident was embedded as background within a larger discussion of a meeting at the Vatican in the middle of spring 1981 between Pope John Paul II and his six most powerful cardinals. In his book The Final Conclave, published on 1 August 1978, the month of the 1978 conclave that resulted in the 26 August election of Albino Luciani, Martin wrote of the unexpected election of a Cardinal Angelico, a figure that has been interpreted as corresponding to Luciani.

== Controversies ==
=== Alleged affairs ===
There are several allegations made against Martin of having affairs with women, all released after his death:

- In his 2002 book Clerical Error: A True Story, the former Vatican correspondent for Time magazine, Robert Blair Kaiser, writes that his marriage was destroyed by an affair between his wife and Martin, which began in 1964 while Kaiser was in Rome covering the Second Vatican Council. Kaiser alleges that Martin was successful for a time in manipulating some members of their common social circle, to the extent that Kaiser was briefly interned at The Institute of Living, a mental hospital in Hartford, Connecticut with ties to the Catholic church, thus helping Martin to discredit him and keeping him away from Rome while Martin continued the affair. In Kaiser's account, Martin fled to the United States as a renegade from the priesthood.
- In her 2008 book, Queen of the Oil Club: The Intrepid Wanda Jablonski and the Power of Information, Anna Rubino wrote that Martin had a love affair with oil journalist Wanda Jablonski in 1972. According to Rubino's account, the two met in Long Island and then spent time together in Egypt and Saudi Arabia. Rubino describes Martin as a man with "a reputation for seducing women."
- Sarah Colwell claimed in her 2016 memoir Disguised as a Man: Malachi Martin & Me, that she and Martin had a long affair in the 1980s, during which Martin was also involved with other women. Colwell claims that Martin encouraged her to use artificial birth control, including an intrauterine device, despite his public professions of traditionalist Catholicism, and that he was also sexually involved with his wealthy patroness Kakia Vernicos Livanos, the widow of Greek-American shipping magnate George M. Livanos.
- Martin lived with Livanos in New York City for 27 years, right up to his death. The two are buried together under a single headstone in the Gate of Heaven Cemetery, in Hawthorne. Despite the claim by his defenders that Martin resided with Livanos as a household priest (an arrangement once common among aristocratic Catholic families in Europe), Livanos remained during her lifetime a member of the Greek Orthodox Church.
- Robert Blair Kaiser's claim that Martin had an affair with his wife and the allegations that Martin also conducted an affair with Kakia Livanos were corroborated by the American literary critic Edmund Wilson in his journal The Sixties. Wilson and Martin met at social events organized by their mutual publisher, Roger Straus:
  Lunch with Malachi Martin: he talked about the scrolls but also what it meant to be a Jesuit. I can see he is going through a crisis on account of leaving the order and also, Roger [Straus] thinks, because his Greek girlfriend is a "ball-crusher"...He ridiculed the sacred relics: the arm of St. Theresa, the bones of the Magi on the ceiling at Cologne, the foreskin of Jesus, which he says caused a war (I thought this was an invention of Peyrefitte's) ...I had learned from Roger that Martin had had an affair in Rome with the wife of the Time-Life representative, and that he had been exiled by the Church to Jerusalem, where for two years he edited a magazine.

=== Laicization dispute ===
The Traditionalist Catholic website Daily Catholic said in 2004 that Father Vincent O'Keefe, former Vicar General of the Society of Jesus and a past President of Fordham University, stated that Martin had never been laicized. According to this report, O'Keefe stated that Martin had been released from his Jesuit vows except for chastity.

Martin himself is quoted as stating that "'In 1965, Mr. Martin received a dispensation from all privileges and obligations deriving from his vows as a Jesuit and from priestly ordination' (Congregation for Institutes of Consecrated Life and Societies of Apostolic Life, 25 June 1997, Prot. N. 04300/65)".

The Daily Catholic said its 2004 statement was based on one by William Kennedy, according to which the declaration of Martin's laicization was mounted in retaliation for his book The Jesuits, which accused the Jesuits of deviating from their original character and mission by embracing liberation theology.

=== Alleged ordination as a bishop ===
During a videotaped memorial titled Malachi Martin Weeps For His Church, Rama Coomaraswamy claimed that Martin had told him that he had been secretly consecrated a bishop by Pius XII. Martin's mission was to ordain priests and bishops for the underground churches of Eastern Europe and the Soviet Union. Coomaraswamy died in 2006.

=== Alleged authorship ===
- The book The Pilgrim: Pope Paul VI, The Council and The Church in a time of decision was written by Martin under the pseudonym Michael Serafian. This was confirmed by Martin himself and corroborated independently by the Swiss Catholic dissident and priest Hans Küng. Martin related that his choice of surname, Serafian, was due to meeting a carpet dealer in Jerusalem with that name, during the trip of Paul VI to Jordan in January 1964. Serafian is a common Armenian surname.
- The pseudonym of Xavier Rynne, used to write more than 20 books on Vatican II, is not that of Martin, but of Fr. Francis X. Murphy C.Ss.R.
- The 1966 article Laures et ermitages du désert d'Egypte published in Mélanges de l'Université Saint-Joseph by the hand of "M. Martin" was written by Maurice Martin, not Malachi Martin.
- Martin also ghostwrote large sections of Robert Blair Kaiser's first book Pope, Council and World (1963). At the time, Kaiser and Martin were allies in promoting the liberal cause at the Second Vatican Council. Kaiser claimed that, due to 'terrific deadline pressure', he allowed Martin to write 'pen portraits' of the major participants at the Council. On Kaiser's instructions, Martin produced a description of Cardinal Ottaviani's eyes as they supposedly appeared at a secret meeting ('one weary eye peering through barreled shutters; the other eye wide open and staring in downright challenge'). Ottaviani was so offended by this passage--and by a later claim also sourced from Martin published by Kaiser in Time magazine that he had described John XXIII's death as 'the hand of God'--that Kaiser was forced to personally apologize to Ottaviani at a private meeting.

=== Joseph Roddy allegations ===
Journalist Joseph Roddy alleged—in a 1966 Look Magazine article about the debate about Jews during the Second Vatican Council—that one and the same person under three different pseudonyms had written or acted on behalf of Jewish interest groups, such as the American Jewish Committee, to influence the outcome of the debates. Roddy wrote that two timely and remunerated 1965 articles were penned under the pseudonym F.E. Cartus, one for Harper's Magazine and one for the American Jewish Committee's magazine Commentary.

In his 2007 book Spiritual Radical: Abraham Joshua Heschel in America, Edward K. Kaplan confirmed that Martin cooperated with the American Jewish Committee during the Council "for a mixture of motives, both lofty and ignoble...[He] primarily advised the committee on theological issues, but he also provided logistical intelligence and copies of restricted documents." It is confirmed in the book that Martin used the pseudonyms Forest and Pushkin. Kaplan acknowledges that The Pilgrim by Michael Serafian, was requested from Martin by Abraham J. Heschel, who arranged for the book to be published by Roger W. Straus, Jr.'s Farrar, Straus and Giroux printing company. It was published in the hope that it would influence the deliberations in the council. Once Martin's identity as the author was revealed, it led to protests "and the book had to be removed from circulation at a considerable financial loss to the publisher". Kaplan lastly states that Martin was the primary source of information for Joseph Roddy in writing his 1966 article for Look Magazine, and that O'Boyle-Fitzharris was, in fact, Martin. Kaplan judges the Roddy article as "dangerously misleading [due] to the credence it gives to the claim that without organised Jewish pressure the council declaration on the Jews would not have been accepted."

Elsewhere, Martin admitted some of his work involved intelligence gathering behind the Iron Curtain and throughout the Middle East, and at times threatening cardinals with blackmail if they did not want to do what Bea and John XXIII wanted from them at the council. "I saw cardinals sweating in front of me," Martin recalled. "And I began to enjoy it."

=== Alleged Jewish heritage ===
Rumours appearing on various Catholic or sedevacantist websites and magazines alleged that Martin had Jewish ancestry that descended from Iberian Jews who migrated to Medieval Ireland and the Kingdom of England in the 15th century, and also alleged him being an Israeli spy because of his first name, Malachi, after a Hebrew prophet and his extensive travels in the Levant.

Martin himself claimed Jewish ancestry on multiple occasions. In a 1976 interview with Publisher's Weekly, Martin stated that his family were "half Protestant, half Catholic, with a strain of Jewish, and always fighting". Martin likewise alleged to Ben L. Kaufman, a religion reporter with the Cincinnati Enquirer, that he bore the 'name of an Iberian Jewish banker-refugee who married into the Martins of County Galway three centuries ago'.

Rumors about Martin's Jewish ancestry were rebutted by William H. Kennedy (In Defense of Father Malachi Martin). After having made genealogical inquiries with surviving relatives of Martin in Ireland, Kennedy concluded that Martin's father was an Englishman who moved to Ireland and that Martin's mother was Irish on both sides. Fr. Rama Coomasrawamy confirmed this independently. The Irish language name Maélsheachlainn is usually anglicized as "Malachy", and Saint Malachy was a 12th-century Irish Catholic saint.

=== Alleged photograph ===
Claims that Martin features as a curial monsignor in full regalia on a prominent photograph next to John Paul I and his assistant Diego Lorenzi appeared on the Internet. The photograph, published in David Yallop's In God's Name: An Investigation into the Murder of Pope John Paul I as number 28 between pages 120 and 121, shows a "Monsignor Martin", visibly different from Malachi Martin. This is a case of mistaken identification: the cleric in the photograph was Jacques-Paul Martin, Prefect of the Casa Pontificia from 1969 to 1986.

== See also ==
- Franz König
- Alfred Kunz
- Marcel Lefebvre
- Leo Joseph Suenens

== Bibliography ==
=== Non-Fiction ===
- The Scribal Character of the Dead Sea Scrolls Vol. 1, Bibliothèque du Muséon 44, Publications Universitaires, Louvain, 1958
- The Scribal Character of the Dead Sea Scrolls Vol. 2, Bibliothèque du Muséon 45, Publications Universitaires, Louvain, 1958
- The Pilgrim: Pope Paul VI, The Council and The Church in a time of decision, Farrar, Straus, New York, 1964 (written under the pseudonym of Michael Serafian)
- The Encounter: Religion in Crisis, Farrar, Straus and Giroux, New York, 1969; ISBN 0-374-14816-3 (in collaboration with Henry Allen Moe)
- Three Popes and the Cardinal: The Church of Pius, John and Paul in its Encounter with Human History, Farrar, Straus and Giroux, New York, 1972; ISBN 0-374-27675-7
- Jesus Now, E. P. Dutton, New York, 1973; ISBN 0-525-13675-4
- The New Castle: Reaching for the Ultimate, E.P. Dutton, New York; 1974 ISBN 0-525-16553-3
- Hostage to the Devil: The Possession and Exorcism of Five Living Americans, 1st edition, Reader's Digest, New York, 1976; ISBN 0-06-065337-X; 2nd edition with a new preface by the author, HarperSanFrancisco, San Francisco, CA, U.S. 1992; ISBN 0-06-065337-X
- The Decline and Fall of the Roman Church, G. P. Putnam's Sons, New York, 1981; ISBN 0-399-12665-1
- Rich Church, Poor Church: The Catholic Church and its Money, G. P. Putnam's Sons, New York, 1984; ISBN 0-399-12906-5
- There is Still Love: Five Parables of God's Love That Will Change Your Life, Macmillan, New York, 1984; ISBN 0-02-580440-5
- The Marian Year of His Holiness, Pope John Paul II, Saint Paul, Remnant Press, 1987
- The Jesuits: The Society of Jesus and the Betrayal of the Roman Catholic Church, Simon & Schuster, New York, 1987; ISBN 0-671-54505-1
- God's Chosen People: The Relationship between Christian and Jews, Remnant Press, Saint Paul, 1988
- Apostasy Within: The Demonic in the (Catholic) American Church, Christopher Publishing House, Hanover, 1989 ISBN 0-8158-0447-4 (in collaboration with Paul Trinchard S.T.D.)
- The Keys of This Blood: The Struggle for World Dominion between Pope John Paul II, Mikhail Gorbachev, and the Capitalist West, Simon & Schuster, New York, 1990; ISBN 0-671-69174-0
- The Thunder of Justice: The Warning, the Miracle, the Chastisement, the Era of Peace, MaxKol Communications, Sterling, 1993; ISBN 0-9634307-0-X (in collaboration with Ted Flynn and Maureen Flynn)
- In the Murky Waters of Vatican II, MAETA, Metairie, 1997; ISBN 1-889168-06-8 (in collaboration with Atila Sinke Guimarães)
- Fatima Priest: The Story of Father Nicolas Grüner, Gods Counsel Publishing, Pound Ridge, 1997; ISBN 0-9663046-2-4 (in collaboration with Francis Alban and Christopher A. Ferrara)

=== Fiction ===
- The Final Conclave, Stein and Day New York 1978 ISBN 978-0-8128-2434-6.
- King of Kings: a Novel of the Life of David, Simon & Schuster, New York, 1980; ISBN 0-671-24707-7
- Vatican: A Novel, Harper & Row, New York, 1986; ISBN 0-06-015478-0
- Windswept House: A Vatican Novel, Doubleday, New York, 1996; ISBN 0-385-48408-9

=== Articles ===
- "Revision and reclassification of the Proto-Byblian signs", in Acta Orientalia, No. 31, 1962
- "The Balu'a Stele: A New Transcription with Paleographic and Historical Notes", Annual of the Department of Antiquities of Jordan, 1964, pp. 8–9 (in collaboration with Ward William)
- "Jewish Christian Ceasefire" (PDF), Worldview Magazine, vol. 17, no. 1, New York: Carnegie Council for Ethics in International Affairs, pp. 17–19, January 1974, OCLC 5856776, archived from the original (PDF) on 15 March 2012 (debate with James A. Rudin and David R. Hunter).
- "The Scientist as Shaman", Harper's Magazine, vol. 244, no. #1462, March 1972.
- "Death at Sunset", in National Review, November 22, 1974
- "The Scientist as Shaman", in Clarke, Robin, Notes for the future: an alternative history of the past decade, Universe Books, New York, 1975; ISBN 0-87663-929-5
- "On Toying with Desecration", in National Review, October 10, 1975
- "On Human Love", in National Review, September 2, 1977
- "Test-Tube Morality", in National Review, October 13, 1978
- "Footsteps of Abraham", The New York Times, 13 March 1983.

== Related books and articles ==
- Kennedy, William H. (2004). Lucifer's lodge: Satanic ritual abuse in the Catholic Church. Hillsdale, NY: Sophia Perennis. ISBN 978-0-900588-06-8.
- Marinelli, Luigi, Shroud of Secrecy: The Story of Corruption Within the Vatican
- ——— (2001), Fumo di Satana in Vaticano [Smoke of Satan in the Vatican] (in Italian), ISBN 978-8879531030
- Upton, Charles, The System of Antichrist.
- Wiltgen, Ralph M., The Rhine Flows into the Tiber
