= Forstmann =

Forstmann is a German surname. Notable people with the surname include:

- Arnold Forstmann (1842–1914), German artist
- Gustav Forstmann (1908–1985), German naval commander
- Judith Forstmann (died 2009), Argentinian politician
- Julius Anthony (Tony) Forstmann, businessman
- Nicholas C. Forstmann (1947–2001), businessman
- Theodore J. Forstmann (1940–2011), businessman
- Walther Forstmann (1883–1973), German U-boat commander

== See also ==
- Forstmann Little & Company
- ForstmannLeff (founded 1968), founded by J. Anthony Forstmann and Joel B. Leff
- Förstemann
