= The Predators' Ball =

1988 nonfiction book by Connie Bruck

The Predators' Ball: The Inside Story of Drexel Burnham and the Rise of the Junk Bond Raiders
- Softcover edition
- Author: Connie Bruck
- Language: English
- Subject: Hostile takeovers, mergers & acquisitions, junk bonds
- Genre: Non-fiction
- Publisher: Penguin
- Publication date: 1988
- Publication place: United States
- Media type: Print, e-book
- Pages: 400
- ISBN: 978-0-14-012090-5

The Predators' Ball: The Inside Story of Drexel Burnham and the Rise of the Junk Bond Raiders, by Wall Street Journal writer Connie Bruck, largely recounts the rise of Michael Milken, his firm Drexel Burnham Lambert, and the leveraged buyout boom they helped to fuel in the 1980s.

== Overview ==
As the book was published at the apex of the leveraged buyout boom, it was subsequently updated to also address the impending collapse of Drexel Burnham and Michael Milken's conviction on various securities and reporting violations.

The title of the book is a reference to an event that Drexel Burnham hosted annually. Among the participants in the Predators' Ball were an array of private equity investors, corporate raiders such as Ron Perelman and Carl Icahn as well as institutional investors in high-yield bonds and management teams from companies that either had been or would be the targets of leveraged buyouts.

Michael Milken reportedly offered to pay the author for all of the copies of the book that would have been sold in exchange for stopping her work on Predators' Ball.

== Notable people featured ==
- Herb Allen, head of investment banking firm Allen & Company
- Samuel Belzberg, founder and CEO of First City Financial Corporation
- Leon Black, Drexel Burnham investment banker and founder of Apollo Management
- Ivan Boesky, arbitrageur implicated in the 1980s insider trading scandal
- I.W. "Tubby" Burnham, founder of Burnham & Co., later Drexel Burnham Lambert
- Fred Carr, head of First Executive Insurance
- James Dahl, Drexel Burnham bond salesman
- Donald Engel, Managing Director of Drexel Burnham from 1979 to 1984
- Theodore J. Forstmann, co-founder of buyout firm Forstmann Little & Co.
- Howard Gittis, attorney and advisor to Ronald Perelman
- Sir James Goldsmith, investor and corporate raider
- Samuel J. Heyman, investor and corporate raider
- Carl Icahn, investor and corporate raider
- Fred Joseph, CEO of Drexel Burnham Lambert
- Henry Kravis, co-founder of Kohlberg Kravis Roberts
- Dennis Levine, former Drexel Burnham investment banker
- Cy Lewis, managing partner of Bear Stearns
- Carl Lindner, Jr., investor and businessman
- Lowell Milken, Michael Milken's brother and former Drexel Burnham employee
- Michael Milken
- Nelson Peltz, investor and corporate raider
- Ronald Perelman, investor and corporate raider
- T. Boone Pickens, investor and corporate raider
- Victor Posner, investor and corporate raider
- Felix Rohatyn, investment banker
- Meshulam Riklis, investor and corporate raider
- Martin Siegel, former Kidder Peabody and Drexel Burnham investment banker
- Saul Steinberg, investor and corporate raider
- Jeffrey Steiner, investor in high yield bonds, responsible for introducing Drexel to European investors
- Lawrence Tisch, investor and head of Loews Corporation
- Gerald Tsai, investor, responsible for building Primerica
- Stephen Wynn, casino and real estate developer

== General sources ==
- "No Target Seemed Too Big: The Predators' Ball". The New York Times, July 10, 1988
- "Throwing the Book at Drexel". TIME, June 24, 2001
