= Barbarians at the Gate (film) =

1993 television film directed by Glenn Jordan

- DVD cover
- Based on: Barbarians at the Gate by: Bryan Burrough; John Helyar
- Written by: Larry Gelbart
- Directed by: Glenn Jordan
- Starring: James Garner; Jonathan Pryce; Peter Riegert
- Composer: Richard Gibbs
- Country of origin: United States
- Original language: English

Production
- Executive producers: Thomas M. Hammel; Glenn Jordan
- Producer: Ray Stark
- Cinematography: Thomas Del Ruth; Nic Knowland
- Editor: Patrick Kennedy
- Production companies: Rastar Pictures; HBO Pictures; Columbia Pictures Television

Original release
- Network: HBO
- Release: March 20, 1993

Barbarians at the Gate is a 1993 American biographical comedy-drama television film directed by Glenn Jordan and written by Larry Gelbart, based on the 1989 book by Bryan Burrough and John Helyar. The film premiered on HBO on March 20, 1993. The film stars James Garner, Jonathan Pryce, and Peter Riegert. It tells the true story of F. Ross Johnson, who was the president and CEO of RJR Nabisco.

Barbarians at the Gate received generally positive reviews from critics. It earned nine nominations at the Primetime Emmy Awards (winning for Outstanding Made for Television Movie). It also won Best Miniseries or Motion Picture Made for Television and Best Actor in a Miniseries or Motion Picture Made for Television for Garner at the Golden Globe Awards.

== Plot ==
Self-made multimillionaire F. Ross Johnson, CEO of RJR Nabisco, decides to take the tobacco and food conglomerate company private in 1988 after receiving advanced news of the likely commercial failure of the company's smokeless cigarette called Premier, the development of which had been intended to finally boost the company's stock price.

The free-spending Johnson's bid for the company is opposed by two of the pioneers of the leveraged buyout, Henry Kravis and his cousin. Kravis feels betrayed when, after Johnson initially discusses doing the LBO with Kravis, he takes the potentially enormous deal to another firm, the Shearson Lehman Hutton division of American Express.

Other bidders emerge, including Ted Forstmann and his company, Forstmann Little, after Kravis and Johnson are unable to reconcile their differences. The bidding goes to unprecedented heights, and when executive Charles Hugel becomes aware of how much Johnson stands to profit in a transaction that will put thousands of Nabisco employees out of work, he quips, "Now I know what the 'F' in F. Ross Johnson stands for." The greed is so evident, Kravis's final bid is declared the winner, even though Johnson's was higher.

The title of the book and movie comes from a statement by Forstmann in which he calls Kravis' money "phoney junk bond crap" and how he and his brother are "real people with real money," and that to stop raiders like Kravis: "We need to push the barbarians back from the city gates."

== Cast ==
- James Garner as F. Ross Johnson
- Jonathan Pryce as Henry Kravis
- Peter Riegert as Peter Cohen
- Joanna Cassidy as Linda Robinson
- Fred Dalton Thompson as Jim Robinson
- Leilani Sarelle (credited as Leilani Ferrer) as Laurie Johnson
- Matt Clark as Edward A. Horrigan, Jr.
- Jeffrey DeMunn as H. John Greeniaus
- David Rasche as Ted Forstmann
- Tom Aldredge as Charles Hugel
- Graham Beckel as Don Kelly
- Peter Dvorsky as George R. Roberts
- Mark Harelik as Peter Atkins
- John Mansfield as Buffalo Bill
- Joseph Kell as Nick Forstmann
- Rita Wilson as Carolyne Roehm-Kravis
- Ron Canada as Vernon Jordan

== Release ==
=== Reception ===
Review aggregator Rotten Tomatoes gives the film a rating of 71% based on 7 reviews, with an average rating of 3/5. Tony Scott of Variety stated the film "fascinates; as social commentary, it excels. Making an intricate business exercise both entertaining and engrossing takes lots of doing; it’s handily accomplished here." John J. O'Connor of The New York Times stated "Want to compare Barbarians at the Gates to Citizen Kane? No way. Compared with your average television movie? Don't miss it."

=== Home media ===
Barbarians at the Gate is available on DVD.

== Awards and nominations ==
Year	Award	Category	Nominee(s)	Result	Ref.
1993	Artios Awards	Best Casting for TV Movie of the Week	Marsha Kleinman	Nominated	
1993	Primetime Emmy Awards	Outstanding Made for Television Movie	Thomas M. Hammel, Glenn Jordan, Ray Stark, and Marykay Powell	Won (Note: Tied with Stalin.)	
1993	Primetime Emmy Awards	Outstanding Lead Actor in a Miniseries or a Special	James Garner	Nominated	
1993	Primetime Emmy Awards	Outstanding Supporting Actor in a Miniseries or a Special	Jonathan Pryce	Nominated	
1993	Primetime Emmy Awards	Outstanding Supporting Actor in a Miniseries or a Special	Peter Riegert	Nominated	
1993	Primetime Emmy Awards	Outstanding Individual Achievement in Directing for a Miniseries or a Special	Glenn Jordan	Nominated	
1993	Primetime Emmy Awards	Outstanding Individual Achievement in Writing for a Miniseries or a Special	Larry Gelbart	Nominated	
1993	Primetime Emmy Awards	Outstanding Individual Achievement in Art Direction for a Miniseries or a Special	Linda Pearl, Michael Armani, Jan K. Bergstrom, and Karen O'Hara	Nominated	
1993	Primetime Emmy Awards	Outstanding Individual Achievement in Editing for a Miniseries or a Special – Single Camera Production	Patrick Kennedy	Nominated	
1993	Primetime Emmy Awards	Outstanding Sound Mixing for a Drama Miniseries or a Special	Jacob Goldstein, Tim Philben, Ken S. Polk, and James A. Williams	Nominated	
1993	Television Critics Association Awards	Program of the Year		Won	
1993	Television Critics Association Awards	Outstanding Achievement in Drama		Nominated	
1994	American Cinema Editors Awards	Best Edited Motion Picture for Non-Commercial Television	Patrick Kennedy	Nominated	
1994	CableACE Awards	Movie or Miniseries	Thomas M. Hammel, Glenn Jordan, Larry Gelbart, Ray Stark, and Marykay Powell	Nominated	
1994	CableACE Awards	Supporting Actor in a Movie or Miniseries	Jonathan Pryce	Nominated	
1994	CableACE Awards	Directing for a Movie or Miniseries	Glenn Jordan	Nominated	
1994	CableACE Awards	Writing for a Movie or Miniseries	Larry Gelbart	Won	
1994	CableACE Awards	Art Direction in a Dramatic Special or Series/Theatrical Special/Movie or Miniseries	Linda Pearl	Won	
1994	Golden Globe Awards	Best Miniseries or Motion Picture Made for Television		Won	
1994	Golden Globe Awards	Best Actor in a Miniseries or Motion Picture Made for Television	James Garner	Won	
1994	Golden Globe Awards	Best Supporting Actor in a Series, Miniseries or Motion Picture Made for Television	Jonathan Pryce	Nominated	
1994	Writers Guild of America Awards	Adapted Long Form	Larry Gelbart; Based on the book by Bryan Burrough and John Helyar	Won (Note: Tied with Walter Halsey Davis and Vickie Patik for Silent Cries.)	

== See also ==
- List of Primetime Emmy Awards received by HBO
