= J. Anthony Forstmann =

American financier

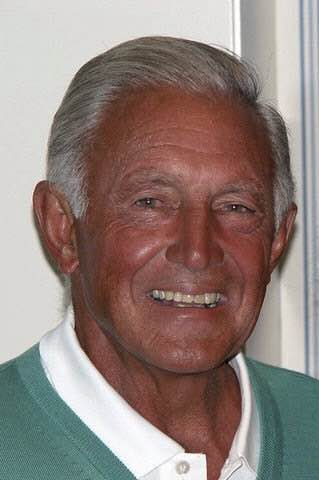
- Born: Julius Anthony Forstmann; May 22, 1938; New York City, New York, U.S.
- Died: January 31, 2023 (aged 84)
- Education: Yale University; Columbia Business School
- Occupation: Private Equity Investor
- Known for: Founder of Forstmann-Leff & Associates, Founder of Forstmann Little & Co. Founder of Forstmann & Co. Founding Partner of Instinet
- Spouses: Charlotte McDonnell Ford (m. 1973; div. 1983); Dorrie Lisabeth Thomson; Catherine Shirriff
- Children: 6

Julius Anthony Forstmann (May 22, 1938 — January 31, 2023) was an American financier. He is one of the founding partners of Forstmann-Leff & Associates, one of the first hedge funds in the United States, along with Joel B. Leff. He was an original investor in Forstmann Little and Company and he also founded Forstmann and Co., a merchant bank.

== Career ==
=== Forstmann-Leff ===
Forstmann-Leff & Associates was founded in 1967 as a private incentive investment management organization by J. Anthony Forstmann and Joel B. Leff with the specific objective of managing money intensively for an above-average rate of return. They served as investment advisers to pension funds and were one of the original hedge funds in the US. By 1985 the firm had grown to $5 Billion under management. The firm's clients included Intel, Pfizer, Standard Oil of Indiana, The Pension Guarantee Corp. The Ford Family, Northrop, Honeywell, Lockheed, Northwest Airlines, Knight Ridder, Delta Air Lines, Texas Instruments, Raychem, Studebaker, Chrysler, Commercial Credit, Primerica, MCA Universal, the City of New York, the State of Minnesota, the State of Maine, the College of the Holy Cross, and the Archdiocese of New York. Forstmann-Leff & Associates achieved an average compounded yearly gain of 22 per cent on the investment partnerships. Forstmann-Leff "outperformed all of the firms monitored by Investment Manager Profiles in the Balanced Account category."

Forstmann continued as managing director of Forstmann-Leff until 1991. Forstmann's brother Ted also worked at Forstmann-Leff as council until he left to found Forstmann Little & Co. with another brother Nick. Joel Leff and Tony Forstmann were part of the original investors of Forstmann Little & Co.

"Forstmann-Leff Associates was one of the nation's most prosperous investment firms, with a consistent, long term performance record that is matched by few other managers"

=== Forstmann Little & Co. ===
Forstmann was an original investor in Forstmann Little & Company in 1975 with his two brothers, Theodore J Forstmann (Ted) and Nicholas C Forstmann (Nick). At its peak, the company was one of the largest private equity firms globally and specialized in leveraged buyouts. He remained a special limited partner until his brother's passing.

=== Forstmann & Co. ===
In 1987 he founded Forstmann & Co to create a merchant banking platform. Prior to founding Forstmann-Leff & Associates, Forstmann held various positions within the investment banking firms of G. H. Walker & Co, Wertheim, and Smith Barney & Co.

=== Director ===
| Company | Description | Public/Private |
|---|---|---|
| Pullham Companies | Major industrial conglomerate | NYSE |
| Home Shopping Network | The first cable TV shopping network | NYSE |
| Community Health Services | The largest rural hospital network | NYSE |
| ABC Citadel Broadcasting | Major radio broadcaster | NYSE |

== Biography ==
Forstmann was born on May 22, 1938, in Manhattan to Dorothy (née Mercadante) and Julius Forstmann, who were of Italian and German descent, respectively. He was the firstborn of six children and raised in Greenwich, Connecticut. His father had inherited Forstmann Woolen Co., from his grandfather, who was one of the richest men in the world at the time. Forstmann graduated from Greenwich Country Day School, Phillips Academy, Yale University and Columbia Business School.

Forstmann has six children; William Anthony Forstmann, Candida Anthony, Christina Giammalva, Baron Forstmann, Luke Forstmann, Kelly Forstmann. He is married to Cathie Shirriff Forstmann.

Forstmann is currently on the Leadership Council of the Yale School of Public Health.

In 1985, Forstmann started The Huggy Bear tennis tournament in Southampton, NY which evolved over 22 years into a major fund raising event for children's charities. Forstmann's brothers Ted and Nick joined forces in 1989 and the tournament ran for 22 years, raising millions of dollars for children globally.

He died on January 31, 2023, at age 84 from natural causes.
