= New World Liberation Front =

1970s American left-wing terrorist group

The New World Liberation Front (NWLF) was a name used by several far-left groups in the 1970s. In its first incarnation in 1970, it was intended as a broader group that would work with the Black Panther Party and would include white and other non-Black American radicals. The term re-emerged in the 1974, being used as a collective pseudonym shared by multiple otherwise-unconnected small left-wing terrorist groups and lone wolf individuals active mainly in Northern California. The majority of bombings carried out under the name NWLF is thought to have been carried out by two individuals based in the Santa Cruz, California area. The history Days of Rage by Bryan Burrough described NWLF as one of the "great mysteries of the underground era" and found that it was credited with twice as many bombings as the next-most prolific group, the Weather Underground.

Initially believed to be a cover for the Symbionese Liberation Army, the NWLF bombings continued long after the breakup of the SLA. Adding to this perception was the fact that several communiques from the SLA announced that they were now the "Jonathan Jackson/Sam Melville Unit of the New World Liberation Front".

The group claimed responsibility for bomb attacks on Hearst Castle, a Coors brewery, and the office of the South African consul in San Francisco. Their most common target was Pacific Gas and Electric utility towers. These attacks were followed with regular communiques that "demanded free utilities for the poor and elderly." In addition to bombing power facilities, the New World Liberation Front is believed to be responsible for sending bombs packaged in See's Candies boxes to two San Francisco Supervisors. Described as having a style similar to the Weather Underground, in 1975 alone they were believed to be responsible for at least 22 bombings, but they were active for the better portion of the 1970s. Among their attacks was an attempted bombing of California politician Dianne Feinstein's house. (Feinstein's housekeeper and her teenage daughter discovered the incorrectly armed bomb in a flower box hanging on the exterior of the house.)

The main perpetrators were likely Ronald Huffman and his longtime partner Maureen Minton. Huffman, who was known around Santa Cruz as "Revolutionary Ron" and who was convicted of ax-murdering Minton, was indicted in 1983 on conspiracy charges related to several attacks for which the New World Liberation Front (and other 1970s revolutionary groups) had claimed responsibility. Huffman and Minton's fingerprints were tied to 16 Bay Area bombings between 1972 and 1977, including the notorious candy-box bombs, as well as attempted bombings, extortion attempts, and marijuana farming. Per Days of Rage, the NWLF bombings seemingly fell into three categories: "Bill Harris and the 'rump' SLA," which carried out two bombings; the Emiliano Zapata Unit, which carried out eight; and the remainder 70-odd attacks were likely the work of Huffman and his very small number of associates. The person who bought Huffman's house after Huffman was incarcerated found, buried in the backyard, "$30,000 in decomposed cash, along with hundreds of pages of NWLF literature: communiqués, codes, manifestos, surveillance rules, revolutionary tracts, and munitions manuals."

The NWLF may have been aligned with, derivative of, or knockoffs of the Chicano Liberation Front, Americans for Justice, and/or the Red Guerrilla Family.
