= James D. Robinson III =

American businessman (1935–2024)

James Robinson III
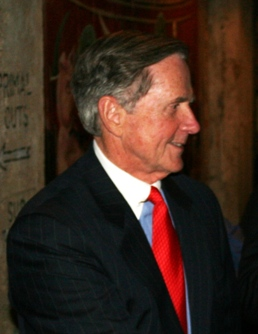
- Robinson in 2006
- Born: James Dixon Robinson III; November 19, 1935; Atlanta, Georgia, U.S.
- Died: March 18, 2024 (aged 88); Roslyn, New York, U.S.
- Education: Woodberry Forest School
- Alma mater: Georgia Institute of Technology (BS); Harvard University (MBA)
- Employer: American Express
- Spouses: Bettye Bradley (m. 1957; div. 1983); Linda Gosden (m. 1984)
- Children: 4

James Dixon Robinson III (November 19, 1935 – March 18, 2024) was an American businessman who was chief executive officer of American Express, from 1977 until his retirement in 1993.

== Early life and education ==
Robinson was born November 19, 1935, in Atlanta, to a wealthy family. He was educated at the Woodberry Forest School and attended Georgia Tech's School of Industrial Management where civil rights icon Blake Van Leer was president. He graduated from Georgia Tech in 1957 where he was a member of the Chi Phi fraternity. After college, Robinson joined the United States Navy. He later earned an MBA from Harvard University in 1961.

== American Express ==
Robinson was Chairman & CEO of the American Express Company for approximately 16 years. He held additional positions at the company prior to that. While at American Express, Robinson achieved the senior position at the company after his competitor for the position, Robert Morley, launched a thwarted hostile takeover of McGraw-Hill. Robinson went on to purchase Shearson Lehman, IDS, First Data Corporation, Trade Development Bank (Switzerland), and several others. He co-created Warner-Amex with Steve Ross. He played a prominent role in the RJR Nabisco leveraged buyout battle as chronicled in the book Barbarians at the Gate. Actor Fred Thompson played Robinson in the 1993 movie.

By the end of Robinson's tenure, he acknowledged that it had not gone well, saying that his "major miscalculation was ‘a focus on overly rapid growth.'"

== Other positions ==
Robinson became a director of The Coca-Cola Company in 1975. He was a general partner and co-founder of RRE Ventures, a private information technology venture investment firm, along with his son, James D. Robinson IV, a venture capitalist, and a classmate of his son from Harvard Business School, Stuart J. Ellman. Robinson was also a president of J.D. Robinson, Inc., a strategic consulting firm. He was previously a long-time Director and Chairman of Bristol-Myers Squibb, and of Violy, Byorum & Partners, which operated in South America.

Robinson also was on the Boards of Directors of PrimeRevenue and was honorary chairman of the Memorial Sloan-Kettering Cancer Center. Robinson was a member of the Business Council and the Council on Foreign Relations, and an honorary trustee of the Brookings Institution and World Travel & Tourism Council, of which he was a co-founder. In previous years, he was co-chairman of the Business Roundtable and chairman of the Advisory Committee on Trade Policy and Negotiations. He was a member of the global senior advisory board at Jefferies Group.

== Personal life ==
In 1957, Robinson married Bettye Bradley; they had two children and divorced in 1983. He married Linda Gosden Robinson in July 1984. They have two children together.

In 1991, Robinson received the Golden Plate Award of the American Academy of Achievement presented by Awards Council member Henry Kravis.

Robinson died March 18, 2024, aged 88, in Roslyn, New York, from respritory failure, caused by pneumonia.

Business positions
| Preceded by Howard L. Clark Sr. | CEO of American Express; 1977–1993 | Succeeded by Harvey Golub |
