= F. Ross Johnson =

Canadian businessman

- Born: Frederick Ross Johnson; December 13, 1931; Winnipeg, Manitoba, Canada
- Died: December 29, 2016 (aged 85); Jupiter, Florida, United States
- Education: University of Toronto (M.B.A.); University of Manitoba (B.Com.)
- Occupation: Businessman

Frederick Ross Johnson, OC (December 13, 1931 – December 29, 2016) was a Canadian businessman, best known as the chief executive officer of RJR Nabisco in the 1980s.

== Early life and education ==
Born in Winnipeg, Manitoba, on December 13, 1931, into a lower-middle-class family, Johnson used a military cadet scholarship program to attend the University of Manitoba, where he graduated in 1952 with a Bachelor of Commerce degree and was President of the fraternity Phi Delta Theta. He went on to earn an MBA from the University of Toronto in 1956.

== Career ==
Johnson first worked as an accountant for General Electric in Montreal and as a vice-president of merchandising for the T. Eaton Company before being named president of Standard Brands Ltd.

Johnson negotiated a merger between Standard Brands and Nabisco with Nabisco CEO Bob Schaeberle in 1981. Soon after, Schaeberle left Nabisco, and Johnson took the helm, replacing many Nabisco executives with ones from Standard Brands. Growing restless, he initiated talks that led to the Nabisco-RJ Reynolds merger in 1985. He was soon appointed president and CEO of RJR Nabisco. Johnson appeared on the December 5, 1988, cover of Time magazine under the headline "A Game of Greed". After dismal stock performance following the 1987 stock market crash, Johnson decided to put the company in play. Originally, he planned to execute a management-led leveraged buyout with Shearson Lehman Hutton. Events quickly escalated into a takeover contest.

He was extensively profiled in the book Barbarians at the Gate: The Fall of RJR Nabisco by Wall Street Journal columnists Bryan Burrough and John Helyar, and in the movie of the same name made for HBO. In the film, Johnson was portrayed by James Garner.

Following the RJR Nabisco takeover by Kohlberg Kravis Roberts & Co. led by Henry Kravis, Johnson started his own private investment company, RJM Group, Inc., based in Atlanta, Georgia. Until he resigned in March 2009, he was chairman of AuthentiDate Holding Corp., a United States publicly traded company. He served on the board of directors of several companies including Bentley Pharmaceuticals. Johnson also served on the advisory board of Power Corporation of Canada.

== Personal life ==
Johnson maintained homes in La Jolla, California and Jupiter, Florida.

He was made a trustee of Duke University and served on the advisory councils of several universities. The Distinguished Visitors Program at the University of Toronto Centre for the Study of the United States was endowed by Johnson in 2001.

== Death ==
Johnson died on December 29, 2016, at his home in Jupiter, Florida, seventeen days after his 85th birthday from pneumonia.
