= Barbarians at the Gate =

1989 book by Bryan Burrough and John Helyar

Barbarians at the Gate: The Fall of RJR Nabisco
- First edition
- Author: Bryan Burrough and John Helyar
- Language: English
- Genre: Non-fiction
- Publisher: Harper & Row
- Publication date: 1989
- Media type: Paperback
- Pages: 592
- ISBN: 0-06-016172-8
- OCLC: 20491096
- Dewey Decimal: 338.8/3664/00973 20
- LC Class: HD2796.R57 B87 1990

Barbarians at the Gate: The Fall of RJR Nabisco is a 1989 book about the leveraged buyout (LBO) of RJR Nabisco, written by investigative journalists Bryan Burrough and John Helyar. The book is based upon a series of articles written by the authors for The Wall Street Journal.

The book was made into a 1993 made-for-TV movie by HBO, also called Barbarians at the Gate. The book centers on F. Ross Johnson, the CEO of RJR Nabisco, who planned to buy out the rest of the Nabisco shareholders.

Henry Kravis and his cousin George R. Roberts, opposed to Johnson's bid for the company, were among the pioneers of the leveraged buyout (LBO). Kravis claimed that he was the first person Johnson had talked to about doing the LBO (although the book mentions previous times) and felt betrayed after learning that Johnson wanted to do the deal with another firm, American Express's former Shearson Lehman Hutton division. Ted Forstmann and his Forstmann Little buyout firm also played a prominent role. Additionally, First Boston's James Maher along with Jay Pritzker launch a creative bid but are unsuccessful.

After Kravis and Johnson were unable to reconcile their differences, a bidding war took place which Johnson would eventually lose. The side effect of the augmented buyout price to the shareholders was the creation of a high level of debt for the company.

The title of the book comes from a statement by Forstmann, in which he called Kravis' money "phoney junk bond crap" and declared himself and his cousin to be "real people with real money," also stating that, to stop raiders like Kravis, "We need to push the barbarians back from the city gates."

== Important personalities ==
- F. Ross Johnson, president and CEO, RJR Nabisco
- Ed Horrigan, president and chief executive officer of R.J. Reynolds Tobacco division of RJR Nabisco
- Edward J. Robinson, chief financial officer of RJR Nabisco
- Peter Cohen, chairman and chief executive, Shearson Lehman Hutton
- Ted Forstmann, senior partner, Forstmann Little & Company
- John Greeniaus, president and chief executive officer of Nabisco division of RJR Nabisco
- Eugene Yetman, chairman of the board, RJR Nabisco
- Henry Kravis, senior partner, Kohlberg Kravis Roberts & Co.
- George R. Roberts, senior partner, Kohlberg Kravis Roberts & Co.
- Jim Robinson, chairman and chief executive, American Express
- Ted Ammon, financier and investment banker
- Charles Hugel, special committee director
- James Maher, investment banking head, First Boston
- Kim Fennebresque, investment banker, First Boston
- Felix Rohatyn, managing director, Lazard Freres
- Ira Harris, banker, Lazard Freres
- Jay Pritzker, chairman of Hyatt and member the Pritzker family.
- Thomas Pritzker
- Harry Gray

== Film adaptation ==
The book was adapted by Larry Gelbart for a 1993 television movie of the same name directed by Glenn Jordan and starring James Garner.

== Publishing information and reception ==
In 2008, HarperCollins re-released Barbarians to mark the two-decade anniversary of the RJR deal. Media columnist Jon Friedman at MarketWatch opined on the occasion that it was "the best business book ever." Friedman spoke with the authors about the two-decade history of the book and of their ensuing careers (the two undertook no further joint projects). Business reporter Andrew Ross Sorkin of The New York Times wrote in his book Too Big to Fail that this is his favourite business book of all time.

== See also ==
- The Predators' Ball by Connie Bruck
- Den of Thieves by James B. Stewart
- Liar's Poker by Michael Lewis
- Discussion Materials by Bill Keenan
- When Genius Failed by Roger Lowenstein
- Too Big to Fail by Andrew Ross Sorkin
- The Big Short by Michael Lewis
- King of Capital by David Carey and John E. Morris
- The Smartest Guys in the Room by Bethany McLean and Peter Elkind
- Money Games by Weijian Shan
