= Catherine Shirriff =

Canadian actress

- Born: 1948 (age 77–78); Toronto, Ontario, Canada
- Occupations: Actress, real estate agent
- Years active: 1974-1985
- Spouse: J. Anthony Forstmann (died 2023)
- Children: 6

Catherine Shirriff is a Canadian actress.

Shirriff was born in Toronto, Ontario, Canada. Her notable roles include the horror comedy Vampira (1974), Nurse Briggs in Bob Fosse's film All That Jazz (1979), as the Klingon spy Valkris in Star Trek III: The Search for Spock (1984), Olga Denerenko in Murder in Space (1985), and co-host with Jack Palance of the first season of the ABC television documentary series Ripley's Believe It or Not!. She later became a real estate agent.

== Personal life ==
Shirriff was married to American financier J. Anthony Forstmann and they have six children. Her husband died on January 31, 2023.

== Filmography ==
Year	Title	Role	Notes
1974	Vampira	Nancy	
1977	The Cabot Connection	Olivia Cabot	TV movie
1978	Wonder Woman	Tara Landon	Episode: "Gault's Brain" (credited as Cathee Shirriff)
1979	She's Dressed to Kill	Kate Bedford	TV movie
1979	Friendships, Secrets and Lies	Layne Plowden	TV movie
1979	All That Jazz	Nurse Briggs	
1980	Ladies' Man	Michelle	Episode: Amy's Fear
1981	The Star Maker	Susan Orwell	TV Movie
1981	Magnum, P.I.	Erin Wolfe	Episode: Skin Deep
1981	Lewis & Clark	Charmaine	Episode: Opposites Attract
1982	Today's FBI	Anne	Episode: Kidnap
1982	One Shoe Makes It Murder	Caroline Charnock	TV Movie
1983	Taxi	Diane McKenna	Season 5, episode 18: "Alex Gets Burned by an Old Flame"
1984	Airwolf	Charmaine Beaucaire	Episode: Once a Hero
1984	Covergirl	Tessa Montgomery	
1984	Star Trek III: The Search for Spock	Valkris	An action figure of her likeness has been released.
1984	Shaping Up	Zoya Antonova	TV series
1985	Murder in Space	Olga Denarenko	
1985	Riptide	Tanya Petrov	Episode: Boz Busters
