= RRE Ventures =

American Venture Capital firm

- Type: Private
- Industry: Venture Capital
- Founded: 1994; 32 years ago
- Founder: James D. Robinson III; James D. Robinson IV; Stuart Ellman
- Headquarters: New York City, New York, U.S.
- Products: Investments
- AUM: US$2 billion (2020)
- Website: www.rre.com

RRE Ventures is an American Venture capital firm based in New York City. The firm primarily invests in seed, series A and series B rounds and focuses on companies operating in the software, internet, communications, aerospace, robotics, 3D printing and financial services sectors.

== Background ==
Stuart Ellman and James D. Robinson IV were classmates at Harvard Business School where they came up with the idea of starting a venture capital firm.

In 1994 they founded RRE Ventures with Robinson's father, James D. Robinson III who was the Chairman and CEO of American Express from 1977 until his retirement in 1993. The name of the firm is derived from the first letter of each co-founder's surname.

The firm focuses on investing in early stage companies.

RRE has been a significant investor in Chinese companies. At one time RRE had made millions from a sale to Ping An Insurance but did not know how to get the proceeds out of China. Laughable suggestions included buying a large diamond or bringing a duffel bag full of cash to Hong Kong to exchange for HKD. In the end, RRE set up two subsidiaries in Hong Kong and Cayman Islands as a solution.
