= Sponsors for Educational Opportunity =

Nonprofit educational organization

Sponsors for Educational Opportunity (SEO) is a non-profit organization providing supplemental educational and career support to young people from underserved communities. SEO has been the recipient of numerous awards and distinctions, and was selected as one of the top-performing non-profits in the country by Social Impact Exchange's new giving platform, S&I 100. Henry Kravis was named chairman of the organization in 2014. Kravis and his wife, Marie-Josee, also pledged $4 million towards the organization. Michael G. Ricciardi served as a member of the Chairman’s Advisory Board.

== History ==
SEO was founded in 1963 by Michael Osheowitz to provide people from deprived communities with access to educational and career opportunities. SEO was one of the first mentoring and college preparatory programs for these communities in New York. The current program model was implemented in September 2006. Additional information needed

== Programs ==
Today, SEO is made up of four distinct programs: SEO Scholars, SEO Career, SEO Law and SEO Alternative Investments. Additional information needed

=== SEO Scholars ===
SEO Scholars is an eight-year program that gets low-income public high school students in New York City and San Francisco to and through college. In high school, the program provides 720 additional hours of academic instruction—the equivalent of 2.5 years of additional English instruction and 1.5 years of additional math instruction on Saturdays, in the summers, and after school.
