= Nicholas C. Forstmann =

Nicholas Curt "Nick" Forstmann (January 15, 1947 – February 2, 2001) was one of the founding partners of Forstmann Little & Company, a private equity firm.

After attending The Lawrenceville School, Forstmann graduated from Georgetown University in 1969, and began working at the Morgan Guaranty Trust Company. In 1975, Forstmann joined Kohlberg Kravis Roberts & Co., a company with which he would later develop a rivalry. He founded Forstmann Little with his older brother, Ted, and Brian Little, in 1978. Forstmann's second brother, J. Anthony Forstmann, founded ForstmannLeff.

Forstmann served on the advisory boards of Georgetown University and Marymount College. He also served as the vice chairman of 1996 Vice Presidential candidate Jack Kemp's Empower America, a free market advocacy group.

He also played a leading role in Forstmann Little's bid to acquire RJR Nabisco. Forstmann was featured in the book about the bidding war, Barbarians at the Gate: The Fall of RJR Nabisco, and was portrayed in the subsequent film by actor Joseph Kell.

Forstmann helped form the Inner-City Scholarship Fund of the Archdiocese of New York.

He died in 2001 of small-cell lung cancer, aged 54.
