= List of Ripley's Believe It or Not! television series =

Ripley's Believe It or Not! is the name of many documentary television series based on the newspaper feature. The first series aired on NBC from 1949 to 1950, and was hosted by Robert L. Ripley until his death, after which several substitute hosts filled in. The series was revived again on ABC, running from 1982 to 1986, and was hosted primarily by Jack Palance. Another revival debuted on TBS in 2000, and aired until 2003, with Dean Cain as the host. A Filipino version, hosted by Chris Tiu, debuted in 2008. An animated series based on the Ripley's franchise was also created, and premiered in 1999. Another revival premiered on Travel Channel in June 2019, with Bruce Campbell as the host.

== Original series (1949–1950) ==
The first Believe It or Not! TV series, a live show hosted by Robert L. Ripley, premiered on NBC television on March 1, 1949. Shortly after the 13th episode, on May 27, 1949, Ripley died of a heart attack and several of his friends substituted as host, including future Ripley's Believe It or Not! president Doug Storer. Robert St. John served as host from the second season until the series ended on October 5, 1950.

In 1956, ABC Films Syndication had John Gibbs and Meridian Pictures prepare a Ripley's Believe It or Not! television pilot.

== Revival (1982–1986) ==
Ripley's Believe It or Not! later returned to television in a second series from 1982 to 1986, on the US ABC network. Actor Jack Palance hosted the popular series throughout its run, while three different co-hosts appeared from season to season, including Palance's daughter, Holly Palance, actress Catherine Shirriff, and singer Marie Osmond. The 1980s series reran on the Sci-Fi Channel (UK) and Sci-Fi Channel (US) during the 1990s.

== Animated series (1999) ==
In December 1995, development was underway by Canadian studio Cinar (now WildBrain) for an animated series based on Ripley's Believe It or Not!. The 26-episode series, titled Ripley's Believe It or Not!, was co-produced by French production company Alphanim, which was founded in 1997. The series premiered on Fox Family Channel on July 14, 1999, and was about three young people who discover unexplained mysteries and unusual items. Reruns would be shown on This TV as part of Cookie Jar Toons up until 2009.

== Second revival (2000–2003) ==
In December 1998, TBS Superstation outbid two broadcast network competitors to purchase the rights from Columbia TriStar Television Distribution for a new Ripley's series that would be an update of the earlier program that aired from 1982 to 1986. The new series, titled Ripley's Believe It or Not!, premiered on TBS on January 12, 2000, with Dean Cain as host. Most episodes open with an act that is performed in front of a live audience, while the rest of the episode involves Cain introducing various segments, each one for a different subject. Kelly Packard became a field correspondent in 2002, and would host coverage of events in which people demonstrate their unusual abilities, usually in front of an audience.

== 2008 version ==
On August 18, 2008, a new version of the series, hosted by Chris Tiu, began airing on GMA Network, a Philippine television channel and lasted until September 22, 2010.

== 2019 version ==
A new Ripley's Believe It or Not!, with Bruce Campbell as the host, was announced in January 2019. The series premiered on Travel Channel on June 9, 2019.
