= William Brian Little =

William Brian Little (1942–2000), known as Brian Little, was one of the founding partners of Forstmann Little & Company, a private equity firm. He graduated from Colgate University in 1964, and he later served as the chairman of the board of trustees. An art building at Colgate was named Little Hall after him in 2001.

Brian Little worked as a senior vice president at White Weld & Co. in Los Angeles. He briefly continued to work at the firm after it was acquired by Merrill Lynch in 1978, and in the same year founded Forstmann Little with brothers Ted and Nick Forstmann.

Little died in 2000 of a heart attack at the age of 58. In addition to his wife, Little was survived by a daughter, Jacqueline P. Little, and a son, Gregory S. Little, both of San Francisco, as well as several grandchildren.
