= Mel Levine =

American attorney and politician

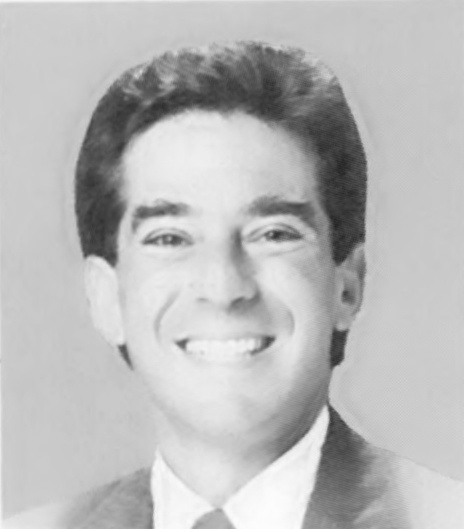

Member of the U.S. House of Representatives from California's 27th district
- In office January 3, 1983 – January 3, 1993
- Preceded by: Bob Dornan
- Succeeded by: Jane Harman (redistricted)

Member of the California State Assembly from the 44th district
- In office July 6, 1977 – November 30, 1982
- Preceded by: Alan Sieroty
- Succeeded by: Tom Hayden

Personal details
- Born: Meldon Edises Levine; June 7, 1943 (age 83) Los Angeles, California, U.S.
- Party: Democratic
- Spouse: Connie Bruck
- Children: 3, including Jake
- Relatives: Jacqueline Alemany (daughter-in-law)
- Education: University of California, Berkeley (BA); Princeton University (MPA); Harvard University (JD)

Meldon Edises Levine (born June 7, 1943) is an American attorney and former Congressman from California. A member of the Democratic Party, Levine served in the United States House of Representatives from 1983 to 1993.

== Early life ==
On June 7, 1943, Levine was born in Los Angeles, California. He graduated from Beverly Hills High School in 1960 and is a member of its Alumni Hall of Fame.

== Education ==
Levine was student body president (1963–64) and valedictorian at the University of California, Berkeley. After attending Princeton (MPA 1966) and Harvard (JD 1969) Universities, he was admitted to the California bar in 1970.

== Career ==
In 1970, after Levine was admitted to the California bar, he set up a private law practice.

He was a legislative assistant to U.S. Senator John V. Tunney from 1971 to 1973. He served in the California State Assembly from 1977 to 1982. He served in the U.S. House of Representatives from 1983 to 1993. He supported the 1991 Gulf War Authorization Act, which authorized the use of United States Armed Forces pursuant to United Nations Security Council Resolution 678.

In 1992, Levine ran for U.S. Senate; he lost in the Democratic primary, to Barbara Boxer, who went on to win the general election in November.

In August 2013 Levine was appointed by Los Angeles Mayor Eric Garcetti to become a member of the Board of Water and Power Commissioners. On September 11, 2013, Levine was confirmed to become a member of the Board of Water and Power Commissioners by the Los Angeles City Council. Levine was the president of the Board of Water and Power Commissioners, but has since left the Board.

Levine is counsel at the law firm Gibson, Dunn & Crutcher and a member of the board of directors of the Pacific Council on International Policy.

== Personal life ==
Levine is married to New Yorker journalist Connie Bruck. He has three children from a previous marriage to retired Superior Court judge Jan Greenberg Levine: Adam, Jake, and Cara.

== See also ==
- List of Jewish members of the United States Congress

U.S. House of Representatives
Preceded by Bob Dornan	Member of the U.S. House of Representatives from California's 27th congressional district 1983–1993	Succeeded by Carlos J. Moorhead
U.S. order of precedence (ceremonial)
Preceded by Richard H. Lehman as Former U.S. Representative	Order of precedence of the United States as Former U.S. Representative	Succeeded by Tom Campbell as Former U.S. Representative
