= Theodore J. Forstmann =

American private equity investor (1940–2011)

- Forstmann in 1997
- Born: Theodore Joseph Forstmann; February 13, 1940; Greenwich, Connecticut, U.S.
- Died: November 20, 2011 (aged 71); New York City, U.S.
- Other names: Ted Forstmann; Teddy Forstmann
- Education: Yale University; Columbia University
- Occupation: Private equity investor
- Known for: Founder of Forstmann Little & Company; Unique subordinated debt fund
- Children: 2

Theodore Joseph Forstmann (February 13, 1940 – November 20, 2011) was one of the founding partners of Forstmann Little & Company, a private equity firm, and chairman and CEO of IMG, a global sports and media company. A billionaire, Forstmann was a Republican and a philanthropist. He supported school choice and funded scholarship programs for the disadvantaged. He led a tour of refugee camps in the former Yugoslavia.

== Early life ==
Forstmann was born and raised in Greenwich, Connecticut, the second of six children. He was the son of Dorothy (née Mercadante) and Julius Forstmann, who ran a wool business that went bankrupt in 1958. Julius had inherited Forstmann Woolen Co. from his own father, one of the richest American businessmen. Forstmann had German and Italian ancestry. He was a graduate of Greenwich Country Day School and Phillips Academy. He then played goalie on the ice hockey team at Yale University where he was a member of Delta Kappa Epsilon fraternity. Forstmann later attended Columbia Law School where he earned a Juris Doctor, which he financed through gambling proceeds.

== Forstmann Little & Company ==
Forstmann, an attorney, founded Forstmann Little in 1978 with his younger brother Nicholas, and Brian Little. Forstmann's second brother, J. Anthony Forstmann, founded ForstmannLeff.

Under Forstmann's leadership, Forstmann Little & Company made 31 acquisitions and significant investments and returned more than $15 billion of profits to investors. In addition to IMG, some of the firm's investments included Gulfstream Aerospace, Dr. Pepper, Topps, Stanadyne Corp., Community Health Systems, Ziff Davis, Yankee Candle, General Instrument Corporation, and most recently, Citadel Broadcasting and 24 Hour Fitness.

== Career ==
=== Critic of junk bonds ===
While playing golf in the late 1980s, Ted Forstmann inadvertently coined the term for which he became best known. His golf partner asked Forstmann what it meant for a company to be taken over by a buyout firm. "It means the barbarians are at the gates," replied Forstmann. The term became part of Wall Street lore and was connected inseparably to the private equity industry that Forstmann pioneered and flourished in. Forstmann was featured prominently in the book Barbarians at the Gate: The Fall of RJR Nabisco, as he and his company attempted to acquire RJR Nabisco. In the subsequent film adaptation, he was portrayed by actor David Rasche. The book portrayed Forstmann as a critic of KKR's Henry Kravis and his investment methods.

Forstmann's criticism of Kravis (and much of the rest of the financial industry during the 1980s) centered on the issuance of high yield "junk" bonds to finance mergers and acquisitions. (Forstmann referred to junk bonds as "wampum".) When the junk bond market later fell into disfavor as a result of scandal, Forstmann's criticism was seen as prescient, as his more conventional investment strategy had been able to maintain nearly the same level of profitability as companies such as KKR and Revlon that built their strategy around high-yield debt.

=== Credit crisis ===
Forstmann accurately predicted the worsening of the credit crisis in July 2008, when most pundits believed the crisis had reached its peak. Forstmann argued that the excess of money pumped into the economy after the September 11 attacks in 2001 distorted the decision-making abilities of nearly everyone in finance. With an oversupply of money, bankers and other financiers took on more risk with less return. While this allowed many to make money for a time, eventually this risk accumulated, and the consequences led to the credit crisis.

== Civic life ==
In 1995, Forstmann was given the "Patron of the Arts Award" by the National Academy of Popular Music at the Songwriters Hall of Fame induction ceremonies.

Forstmann dedicated significant personal resources to the cause of education reform. He was a prominent supporter of school choice. In 1998, he and friend John T. Walton established the Children's Scholarship Fund to provide tuition assistance for low-income families wanting to send their children to private school.

In February 2011, Forstmann became a signatory of The Giving Pledge.

He was an active member of the Republican Party. He served as co-chairman of George H. W. Bush's re-election campaign in the 1992 US presidential election.

== Personal life ==
Forstmann never married. He adopted two boys in the 1990s after meeting them at an orphanage in South Africa.

Forstmann dated Padma Lakshmi, the host and judge of Top Chef. During a break in their relationship, Lakshmi gave birth to a daughter. Lakshmi was initially unclear as to the father's identity, and it was later revealed by DNA testing to be Adam Dell.

In December 2006, newspaper reports on the inquiry into the death of Diana, Princess of Wales alleged that U.S. intelligence agencies had bugged Forstmann's phone or plane and monitored his relationship with Diana. She and her sons were said to have planned to visit him in summer 1997, but British security reportedly blocked the visit over security concerns related to the bugging.

In May 2011, Forstmann was diagnosed with brain cancer and received treatment at the Mayo Clinic. He died on November 20, 2011, of complications from brain cancer. He had a net worth of $1.8 billion as of 2011.
