= Murder in Space =

1985 television film by Steven Hilliard Stern

- Written by: Wesley Ferguson
- Directed by: Steven Hilliard Stern
- Starring: Michael Ironside; Wilford Brimley; Martin Balsam; Damir Andrei; Tom Butler; Wendy Crewson; Scot Denton; Peter Dvorsky; Leo Ilial; Alan Jordan; Jan Rubeš; Cathie Shirriff; Kate Trotter; Nerene Virgin; Alberta Watson; Arthur Hill
- Theme music composer: Arthur B. Rubinstein
- Countries of origin: Canada; United States

Production
- Producers: Robert Cooper; Otto Penzler
- Cinematography: Laszlo George
- Editor: Rit Wallis
- Running time: 95 Minutes
- Production companies: CTV Television Network; Zenith Entertainment

Original release
- Network: Showtime
- Release: July 28, 1985

Murder in Space is also the title of a 1955 science fiction novel by David V. Reed and a 2007 mystery novel by Sydney J. Bounds.

Murder in Space is a 1985 science fiction murder mystery television movie set in the near future. The crew of an international space mission are on the return leg from Mars to Earth when an explosion occurs on the craft Conestoga, shortly after a series of murders starts. The crew of the returning craft are forbidden to return until the murderer is caught.

On its initial worldwide premiere, the film was shown without the ending and a competition was set for the viewers to solve the mystery of who the murderer or murderers were. The conclusion of the film was shown several days later, with the contestants eliminated one by one until the winner correctly identified the killer or killers. The final 15 minutes of the film was shown at a later date when the mystery was solved with only two countries provided winners with the correct answer.

== Conestoga crew ==
Actor	Character	Rank	Country	Murdered	How	Murderer's Possible Motive
Michael Ironside	Neil Braddock	Captain	U.S.A.	No		
Cathie Shirriff	Olga Denarenko		U.S.S.R.	Yes	Strangled/Suffocated	Pregnant with other crew member's child.
Damir Andrei	Andrei Kalsinov	Colonel	U.S.S.R.	Yes	Blown up	Planned to defect
Timothy Webber	Guy Sterling		Canada	Yes	Cyanide poisoning	Needed to be silenced
Tom Butler	Kurt Steiner	Major	East Germany	Yes	Strangled	Judgment
Leo Ilial	Phillipe Berdoux	Doctor	France	No		
Scot Denton	David Tremayne	Navigator	U.S.A.	No		
Kate Trotter	Pamela Cooper		UK	No		
Alberta Watson	Dominica Mastrelli		Italy	No		

== Other cast members ==
Other cast members were reporters, wives and husbands, mission control staff and additional Russian characters.

Name	Rank or part	Played by
	Vice President	Arthur Hill
Dr. Andrew McCallister	Space program director	Wilford Brimley
Dinah Greenberg	Secretary to McCallister	Gloria Carlin
Jeffrey Kilbride	Reporter	Alan Jordan
Mitch Carlino		Peter Dvorsky
Alexander Rostov	Russian Politician	Martin Balsam
Dr. Margaret Leigh	Doctor	Nerene Virgin
Grigori Denarenko	husband of cosmonaut Olga Denarenko	Jan Rubeš
Irene Tremayne	Wife of astronaut David Tremayne	Wendy Crewson

== Prize money ==
- USA - $60,000
- UK - £10,000

== Related Prizes ==
PRIMETIME magazine, the FIRST CHOICE*SUPERCHANNEL program guide, featured a pull-out entry form which allowed viewers to identify the four murdered characters, their nationalities and, bizarrely, “how murdered?”. It then asked the ultimate question – “Who Committed the Murders?”

Readers who correctly guessed the answer had the opportunity to win a trip on the Orient Express however no entries received were actually correct so instead the closest answer to who the murderer was given a year's free subscription to the magazine.

== Accompanying book ==
A novel also called "Murder In Space", published by Penguin, was produced around the same time; the last page of the book was an entry form for the competition to solve the mystery. It was written by "FX Woolf", a penname for Howard Engels and Janet Hamilton.

== Murder in Space: The Solution ==
A television show, hosted in the UK by Anneka Rice and Roger Cook(making his ITV Debut) and broadcast in September 1985 on UK TV Channel ITV, featured members of the UK public who were close or knew who the murderer actually was, thus winning the £10,000 prize money. The solution was then shown in the final 15 minutes of the movie to reveal the answer.
