= Förstemann =

Förstemann is a surname, likely of German origin. Notable people with the surname include:

- Ernst Förstemann (1822-1906), German historian, mathematician, doctor of linguistics, and librarian
- Robert Förstemann (born 1986), German track cyclist

== See also ==
- Forstmann
