= Vampira (1974 film) =

1974 British comedy/horror film by Clive Donner

- Theatrical release poster
- Directed by: Clive Donner
- Written by: Jeremy Lloyd
- Produced by: Jack Wiener
- Starring: David Niven; Teresa Graves; Jennie Linden; Nicky Henson; Peter Bayliss
- Cinematography: Anthony B. Richmond
- Edited by: Bill Butler
- Music by: David Whitaker
- Production company: World Film Services
- Distributed by: Columbia-Warner Distributors
- Release date: 10 October 1974 (London)
- Running time: 88 minutes
- Country: United Kingdom
- Language: English

Vampira is a 1974 British comedy horror film directed by Clive Donner, and starring David Niven and Teresa Graves. This spoof of the vampire genre was re-titled Old Dracula for release in the United States.

In the film, Count Dracula is facing the problems of old age. His attempts to resurrect Vampira, a female vampire from his past, turns her into a black woman. She in turn changes him into a black man. The vampire couple travel to Rio de Janeiro at the end of the film.

== Plot ==
Count Dracula is an old vampire who, because of his advanced age, is forced to host tours of his castle to get new victims. In an attempt to revive his long-lost love, Vampira, Dracula needs to find a victim with a very specific blood group combination to resurrect Vampira by a blood transfusion. So he sets out to collect blood from the bevy of Playboy Playmates visiting his castle after flipping through the July 1973 issue of Playboy. However, one of the Playmates whose blood is drained is black, turning the revived Vampira into a black woman.

Dracula enthralls the hapless Marc Williams to collect blood from three white women in hopes of restoring Vampira's original skin color. Dracula transfuses the blood into her but she is unchanged; however, her bite turns Dracula black. Marc and his love Angela race to destroy Dracula but are taken aback upon seeing Dracula's new skin tone. Their surprise gives the vampires time to slip away to catch a flight to Rio de Janeiro for Carnival.

== Cast ==
- David Niven as Count Dracula
- Teresa Graves as Countess Vampira
- Nicky Henson as Marc Williams
- Jennie Linden as Angela
- Linda Hayden as Helga
- Bernard Bresslaw as Pottinger
- Andrea Allan as Eve
- Veronica Carlson as Ritva
- Minah Bird as Rose
- Freddie Jones as Gilmore
- Chris Sandford as Milton
- Frank Thornton as Mr. King
- Peter Bayliss as Maltravers
- Cathie Shirriff as Nancy
- Aimi MacDonald as woman in hotel room
- Patrick Newell as man in hotel room
- Kenneth Cranham as Paddy, the delinquent
- Carol Cleveland as Jane, the delinquent's victim
- Luan Peters as Pottinger's secretary
- Nadim Sawalha as airline representative
- Marcia Fox as air hostess
- Penny Irving as Playboy Bunny
- Hoima McDonald as Playboy Bunny
- Nicola Austin as Playboy Bunny
- David Rowlands as drunk
- Ben Aris as policeman

== Release ==
The film was released theatrically in the United States by American International Pictures in 1975, under the title Old Dracula, Exhibitors frequently paired Old Dracula on a double bill with Young Frankenstein.

== Critical reception ==
The Monthly Film Bulletin wrote: "Jeremy Lloyd has constructed an entire screenplay on one-line jokes with a vampire theme, with a series of witless and repetitive gags. ... The other joke format is based on the fact that Vampira is black, with her lines including such gems as her reminiscence of dancing in the Twenties: 'Do you remember the Big Apple, the Charleston, my black bottom'; like the whole concept of there being something disturbing about being black, they strike a very sour note. ... As for the performances, Teresa Graves is very beautiful, Peter Bayliss provides amusement by overplaying in a desperate attempt to save the script and, much to his credit, almost succeeds, while Mr. Niven proves that even suavity cannot excuse the indignity of being blacked up."

Leslie Halliwell wrote: "Would-be spoof which falls flat on its fangs."

The Radio Times Guide to Films gave the film 2/5 stars, writing: "David Niven dons the cloak of Dracula in this long-in-the-tooth vampire comedy well past its Swinging Sixties sell-by-date ... Niven adds a touch of class to the ridiculously old-fashioned proceedings and is the only reason for watching this dire farce."

Time Out wrote: "Clive Donner had been living in limbo since the famous disaster of Alfred the Great, but making a movie like Vampira is no way to set any man's career to rights. It's a horror spoof with no sense of style and no sense of humour, for which Jeremy Lloyd's infantile script is as much to blame as Donner's slap-happy direction. Count Dracula's beloved Vampira is mistakenly brought back to life black rather than white, and Dracula (Niven) runs amok in a still-swinging London trying to find an antidote – a plotline which provides sufficient excuse for jokes and wheezes that one thought had gone out with The Munsters. One consolation is that the movie wasn't called 'Fangs Ain't Wot They Used To Be'."

Variety wrote: "Niven does a stylish twist on the Dracula role, playing the Count as an urbane, dinner-jacketed fellow with a fastidious approach to neck-bitthg. Clive Donner's direction is visually sophisticated, but the plot is inane."

Roger Ebert, writing for the Chicago Sun-Times, gave the film one out of four stars, describing it as a mess with only Niven being a highlight, describing the film as a "depressing exercise" due to not being to the standard of British horror films of the time and feeling dated to the previous decade.
