= The Big Rich =

2009 book by Bryan Burrough

The Big Rich: The Rise and Fall of the Greatest Texas Oil Fortunes
- First edition
- Author: Bryan Burrough
- Language: English
- Publisher: Penguin Books
- Publication date: 2009
- Media type: Paperback
- Pages: 556
- ISBN: 0-14-311682-7

The Big Rich: The Rise and Fall of the Greatest Texas Oil Fortunes is the fifth book by Bryan Burrough, published in 2009. The book tells the story of four Texas oil men and their families that made large fortunes in the oil industry: Hugh Roy Cullen, Clint Murchison, Sid Richardson and H.L. Hunt.
