= Dragonfly: NASA and the Crisis Aboard Mir =

- Author: Bryan Burrough
- Language: English
- Genre: nonfiction
- Publisher: Fourth Estate
- Publication date: 1999
- Publication place: United States
- Pages: 432 pp
- ISBN: 1-84115-087-8
- OCLC: 42623272

Dragonfly: NASA and the Crisis Aboard Mir (ISBN 0-88730-783-3) is a 1999 book by Bryan Burrough about the Russian Mir space station and the cosmonauts and astronauts who served aboard. The story centres on astronaut Jerry Linenger and the events on the Shuttle and Mir Space Programme in 1997.

Personnel covered in the book

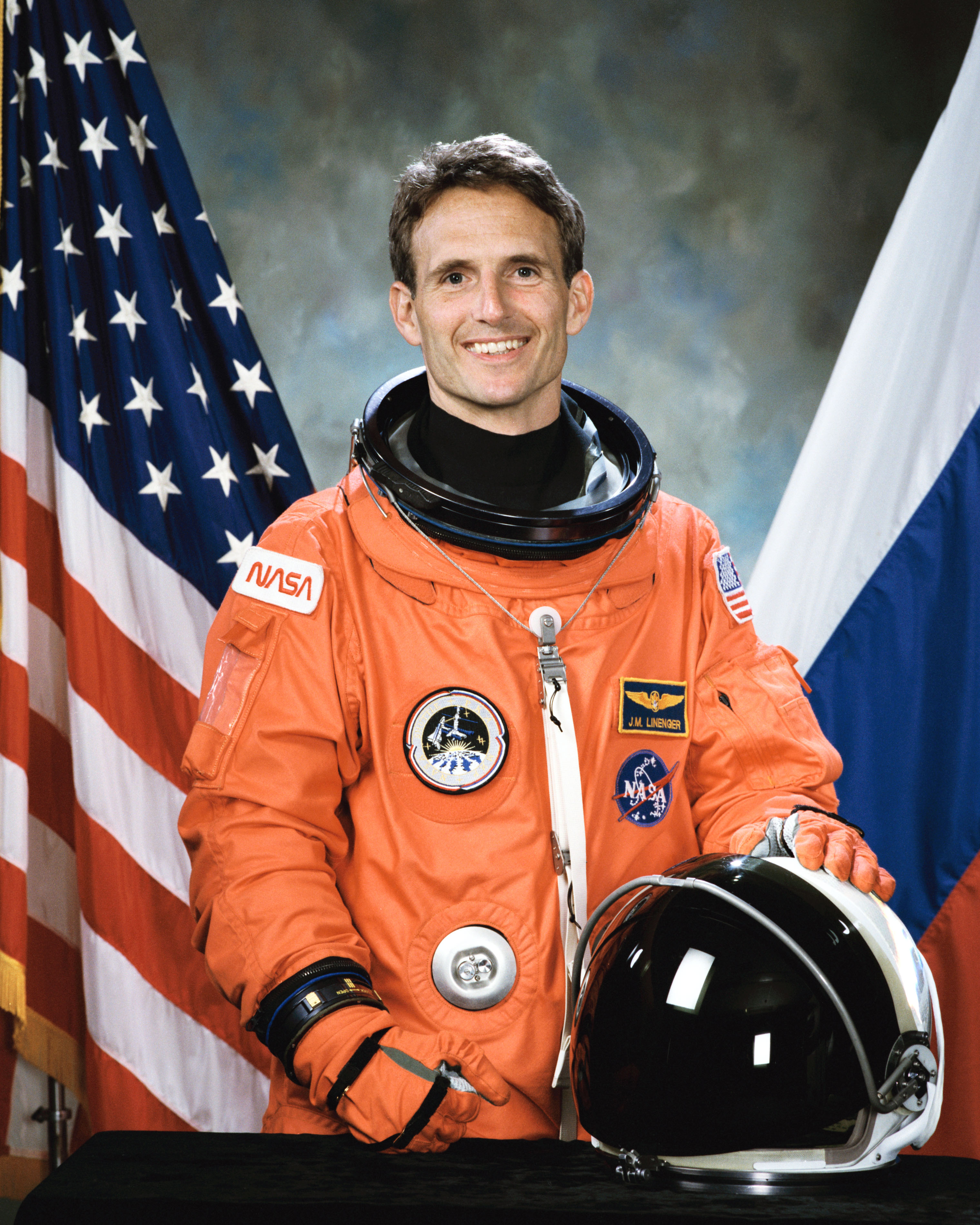
Astronaut Jerry Linenger

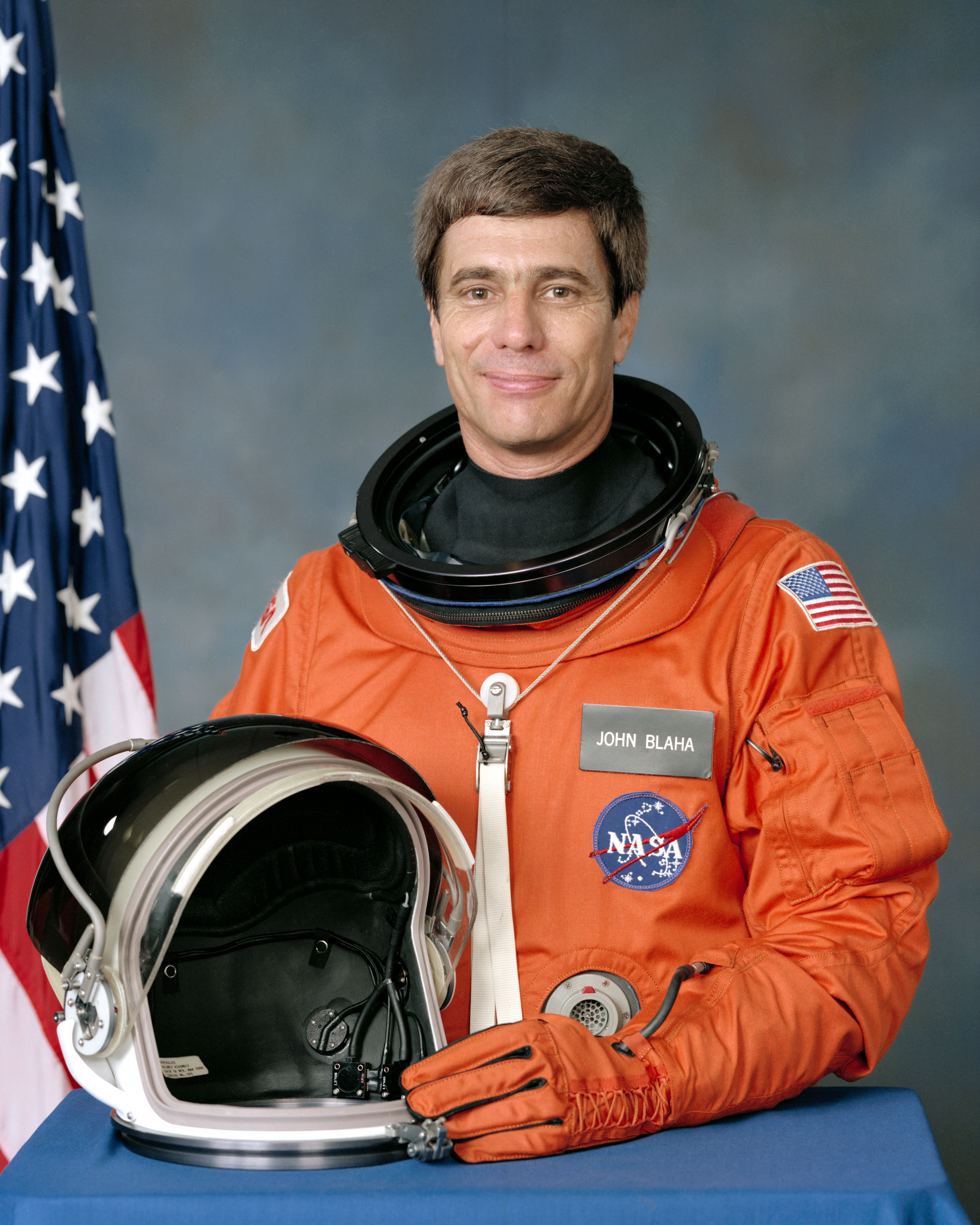
Astronaut John Blaha

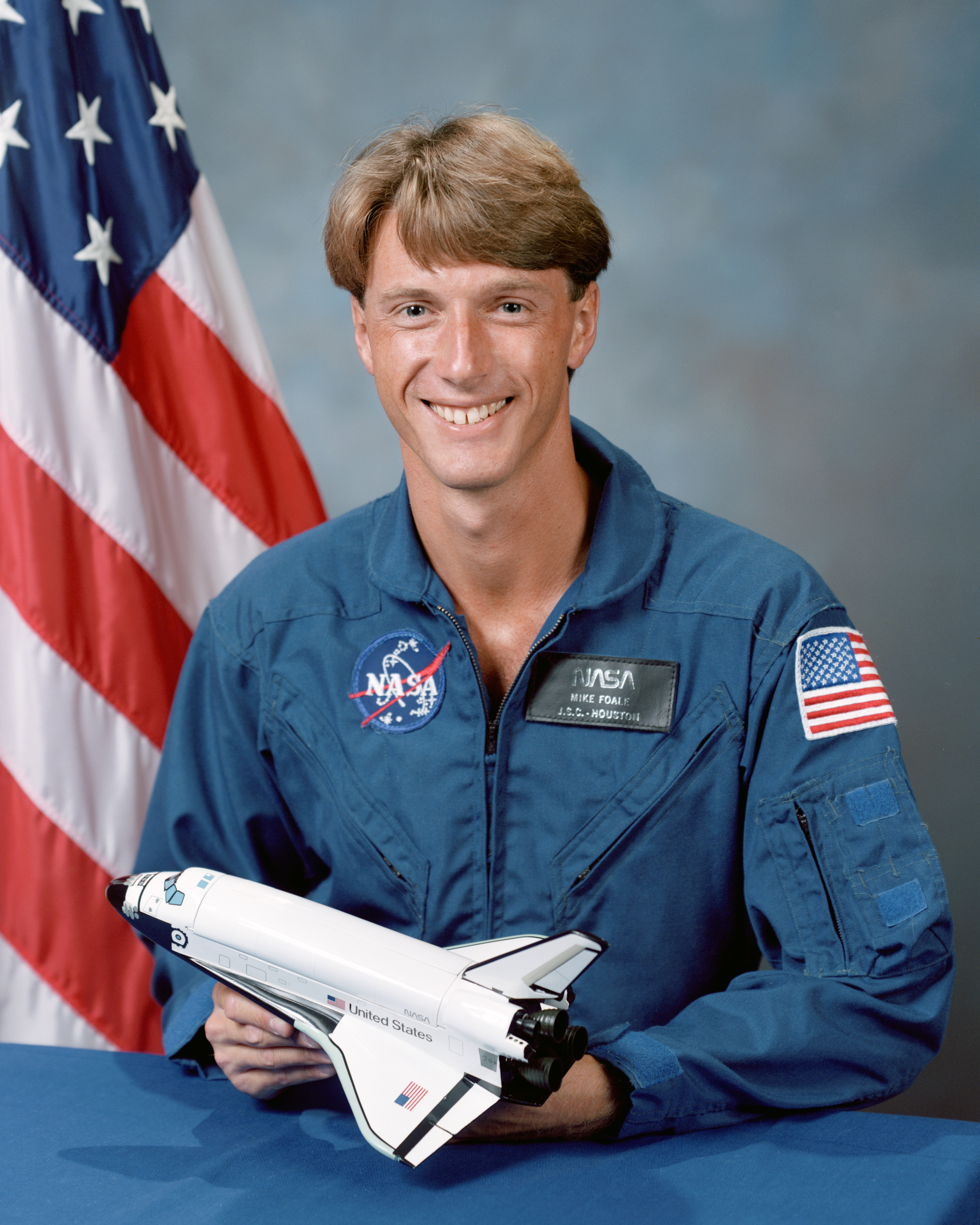
Astronaut Michael Foale

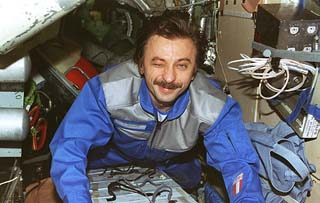
Cosmonaut Aleksandr Lazutkin

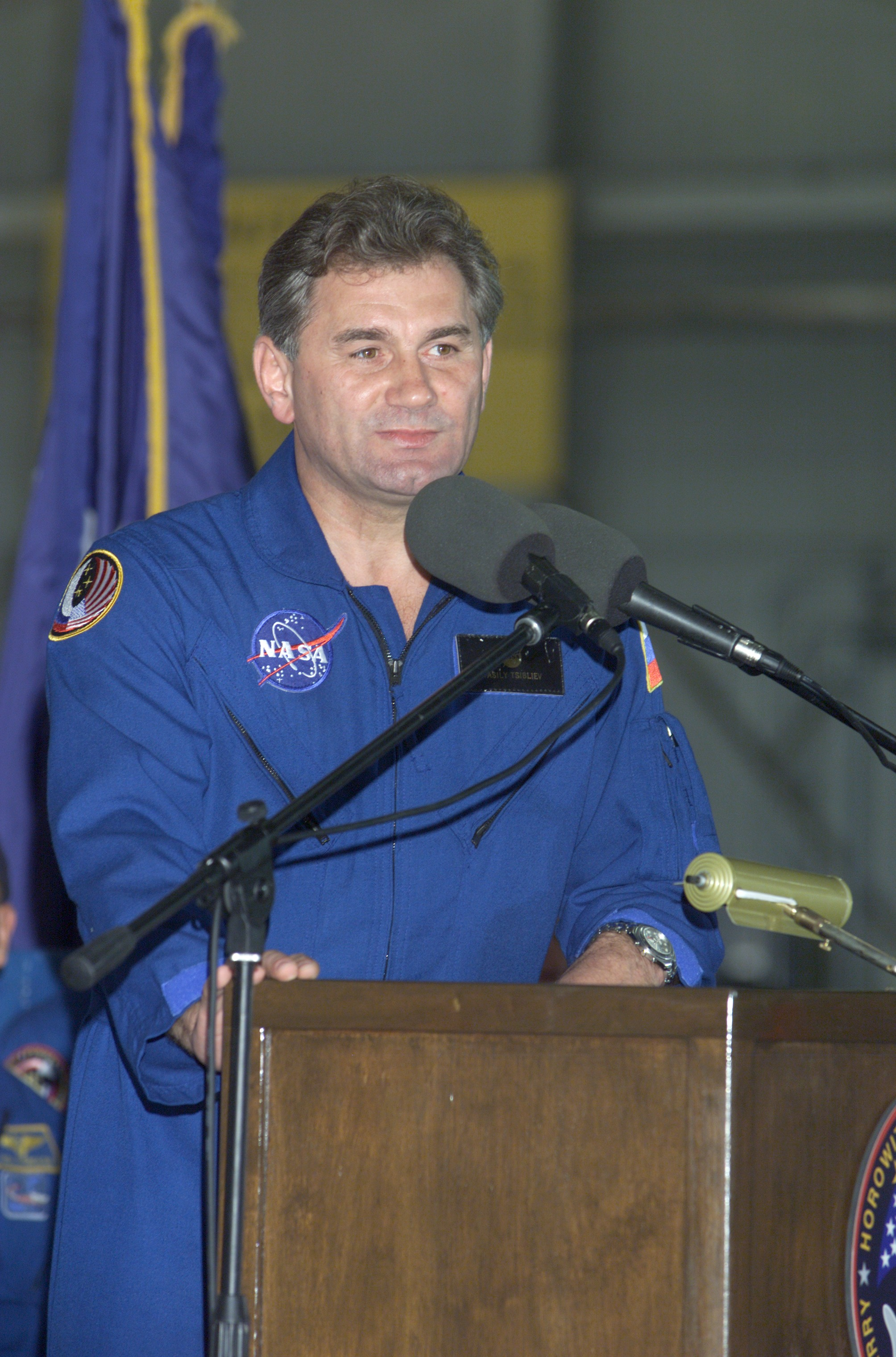
Cosmonaut Vasili Tsibliyev

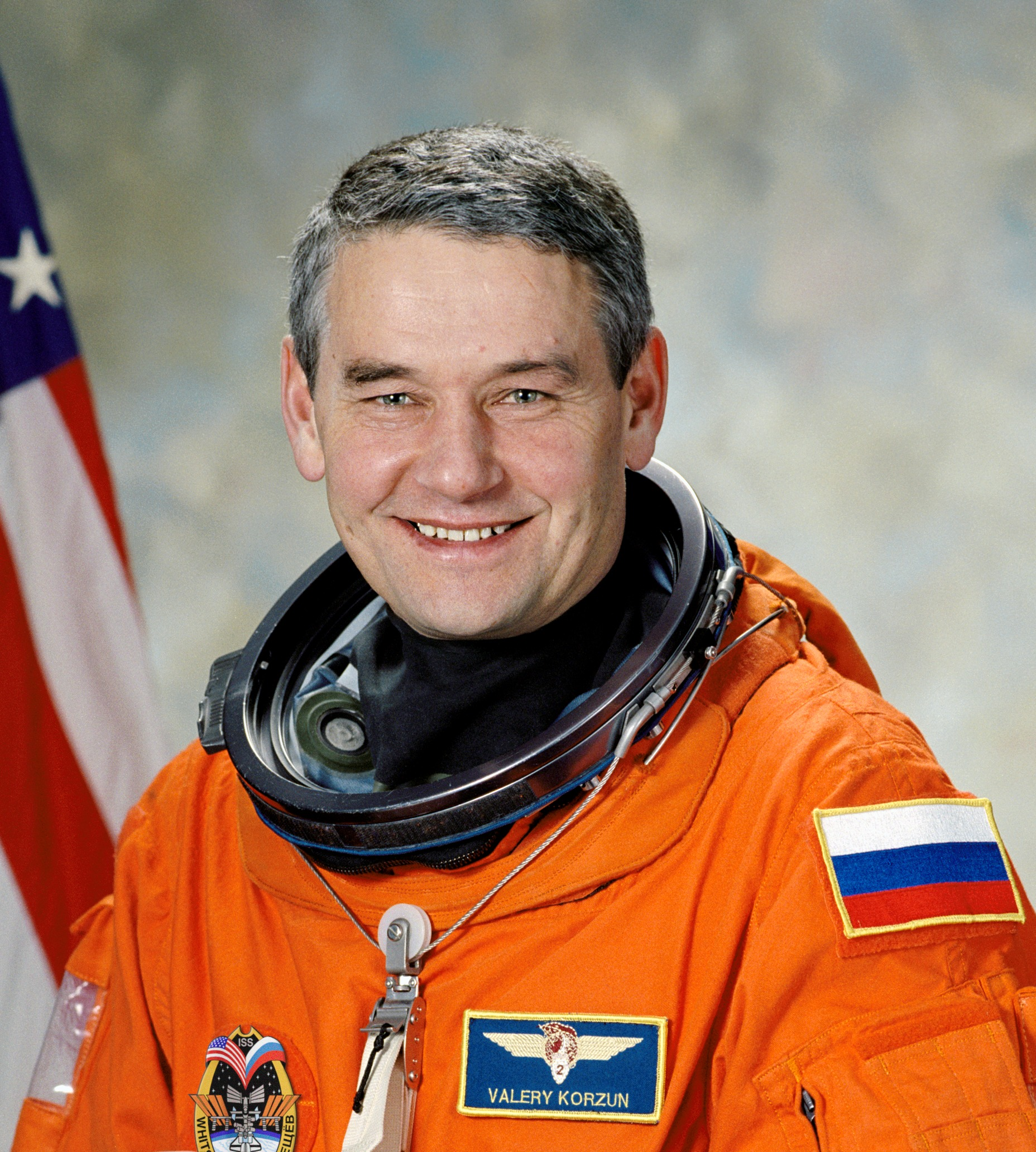
Cosmonaut Valeri Korzun

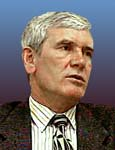
Co-chair, Flight Operations and Systems Integration Working Group, Energia, Viktor Blagov

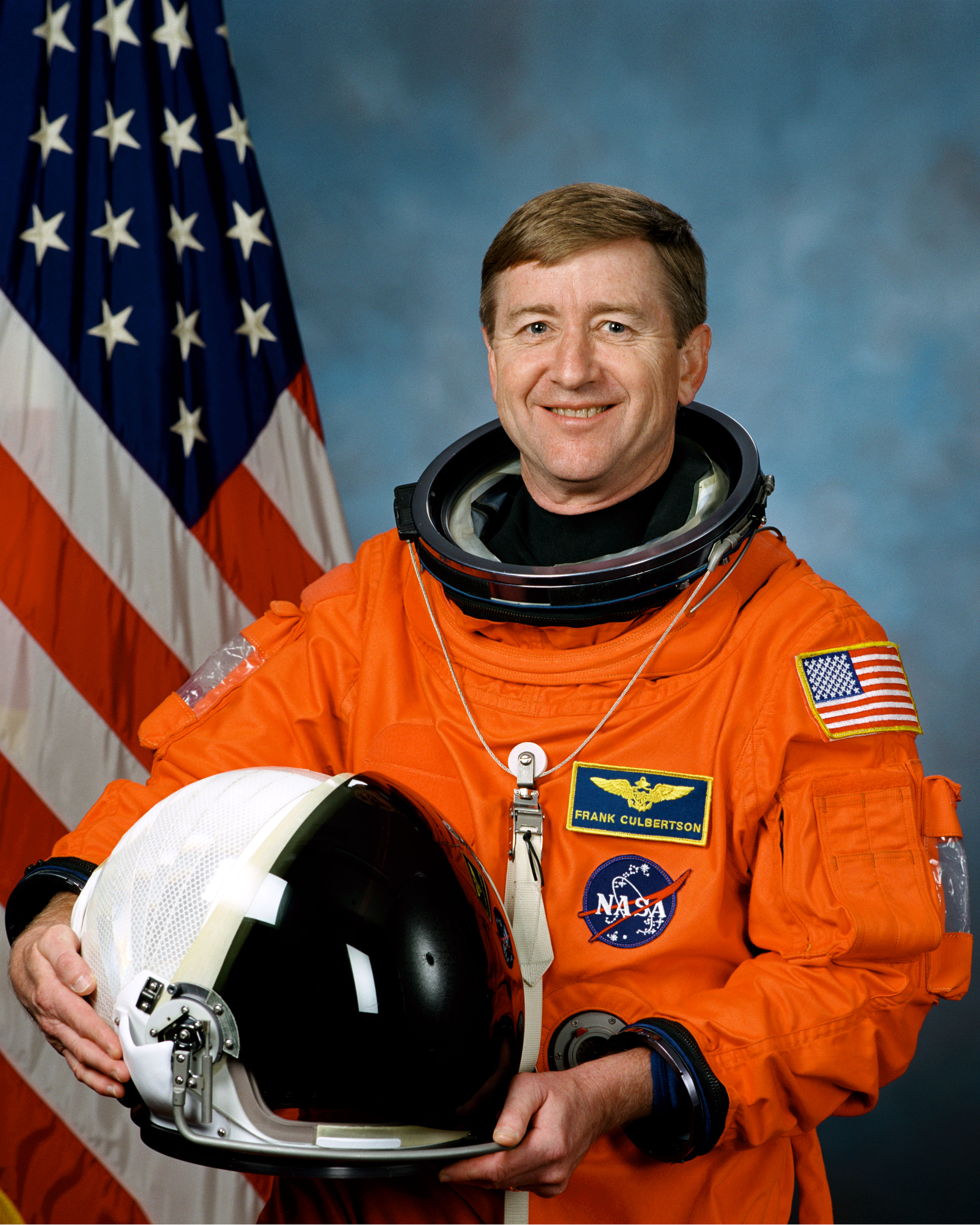
Frank Culbertson

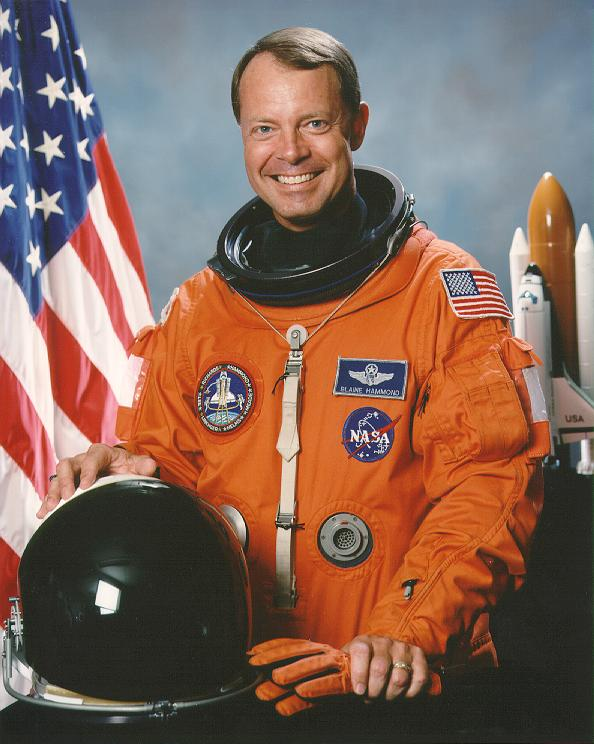
Blaine Hammond

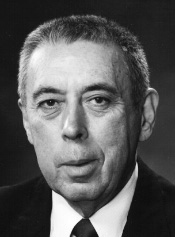
Deputy Associate Administrator for the Office of Space Flight, George Abbey

== See also ==
- The Buran Spacecraft designed as an equivalent to the US Space Shuttle.
- The Energia Rocket, designed to serve as an expendable launch system for the soviet space programme.
- Baikonur Cosmodrome, the launch base in Kazakhstan.
- Ethylene glycol, the anti-freeze which leaked on board Mir.
