= Carolyne Roehm =

American author and fashion designer

- Born: Jane Smith; May 7, 1951 (age 75); Kirksville, Missouri, U.S.
- Education: Washington University in St. Louis
- Spouses: Axel Roehm (m. 1978; div. 1981); Henry Kravis (m. 1985; div. 1993)

Carolyne Roehm (born May 7, 1951) is an American author, businesswoman, socialite, and former fashion designer.

== Early life ==
Roehm was born Jane Smith in Kirksville, Missouri to a high school principal and a schoolteacher. She graduated from Washington University in St. Louis with a Bachelor of Fine Arts degree in 1973.

== Career ==
Following her graduation, Roehm moved to New York City. to work at Kellwood Company, a women's clothing manufacturer. She then moved to Oscar de la Renta as an assistant and model before becoming an assistant designer. De la Renta became a mentor and father figure to her; she initially worked for him for 10 years, returning on and off for the next several years.

In 1985, Roehm launched her own eponymous fashion house. Her high-end clothing was designed for women with money and active lifestyles. Although it received accolades, she shut down the line in 1991. While she formally discontinued her clothing line, she still employed a small staff to run a mail-order business and produce an exclusive line for Saks.

During her time in the fashion industry, she was elected President of the Council of Fashion Designers of America and guided the organization as it became a major supporter of AIDS research.

Moving beyond clothing, Roehm broadened her design horizons and shifted her focus to the world of flowers, entertaining, gardens, interiors and products. Throughout her design career, she has created clothing, accessories, books, decorative accessories for the home, interiors, home fragrance and candles, table linens and table tops, paper products, glassware, and luggage.

Her late friend, Bill Blass, said of her, "[s]he is the ultimate tastemaker."

Roehm has published at least ten books on topics such as gardening, interior decorating, gift wrapping, flower arranging, and party planning.

== Personal life ==
In 1978, Roehm married German businessman Axel Roehm and moved to Germany. Less than a year later, the marriage ended and she returned to work for de la Renta. She later married Henry Kravis in 1985, but the marriage ended in divorce in 1993. The home, decorated for the couple by Robert Denning and Vincent Fourcade, was parodied in the 1990 movie The Bonfire of the Vanities.

In the 1980s, Roehm and Kravis were symbols of the "Nouvelle Societé" in Manhattan. The two were known for hosting lavish parties, including one held at the Metropolitan Museum of Art. They owned four properties worth millions each (such as their $5.5 million Park Avenue apartment), French antiques from the Louis XV to Empire periods, and art works by artists such as Renoir and Sargent.

Roehm resides in New York, Connecticut, Colorado, and South Carolina.

== See also ==
- Kohlberg Kravis Roberts
