= Days of Rage: America's Radical Underground, the FBI, and the Forgotten Age of Revolutionary Violence =

2015 book by Bryan Burrough

First edition (publ. Penguin Press)

Days of Rage: America's Radical Underground, the FBI, and the Forgotten Age of Revolutionary Violence is a 2015 book by Bryan Burrough about American left-wing political violence in the 1970s. The book discusses the Weather Underground, Black Liberation Army, Fuerzas Armadas de Liberación Nacional Puertorriqueña and other groups. Burrough's perspective is generally sympathetic to the law enforcement officials who pursued these groups. The book was generally reviewed positively.
