= Connie Bruck =

American journalist

- Occupation: Journalist
- Employer: The New Yorker (1989–present)
- Spouse: Mel Levine
- Relatives: Jake Levine (stepson)

Connie Bruck is an American journalist and a reporter on subjects covering business and politics. She has been a staff writer at The New Yorker since 1989. Before joining The New Yorker, she was a staff writer at The American Lawyer for nine years. Her stories have also appeared in The Washington Post, The New York Times, and The Atlantic Monthly.

Bruck is married to Mel Levine, a lawyer and former member of the United States House of Representatives.

== Awards and recognition ==
- Her article on Ivan Boesky in The Atlantic won the 1984 John Hancock Award for excellence in business and financial reporting.
- Her profile of Newt Gingrich in The New Yorker titled "The Politics of Perception" won the 1996 National Magazine Award for Reporting.
- Bruck's article "Deal of the Year" in The New Yorker won the 1991 National Magazine Award for Reporting and the Gerald Loeb Award for Magazines.
- Bruck won a second Gerald Loeb Award for Magazines in 2013 for "Cashier du Cinema" in The New Yorker.

== Bibliography ==
=== Books ===
- Bruck, Connie (1988). The Predators' Ball : the junk-bond raiders and the man who staked them. New York: Simon & Schuster.
- Master of the Game: Steve Ross and the Creation of Time Warner, Simon & Schuster, New York, 1994, ISBN 0671725742
- When Hollywood Had a King: The reign of Lew Wasserman, who leveraged talent into power and influence, Random House, New Hork, 2003, ISBN 0375501681

=== Essays and reporting ===
- Bruck, Connie (November 3, 2008). "Odd Man Out: Chuck Hagel's Republican Exile". The Political Scene. The New Yorker. Vol. 84, no. 35. pp. 52–63.
- — (January 16, 2012). "The man who owns L.A." The World of Business. The New Yorker. Vol. 87, no. 44. pp. 46–57.
- — (September 1, 2014). "Friends of Israel". The Political Scene. The New Yorker. Vol. 90, no. 25. pp. 50–63.
- — (May 1, 2017). "A Hollywood story : did the movies really make Steve Bannon?". The Political Scene. The New Yorker. Vol. 93, no. 11. pp. 34–45.
- — (July 29, 2019). "Devil's Advocate: Alan Dershowitz's long, controversial career – and the accusations against him". Annals of Law. The New Yorker. Vol. 95, no. 22. pp. 32–47.
