= John Mansfield (actor) =

American stage and television actor

- Occupations: Stage and television actor
- Years active: 1978–1999

John Mansfield is an American stage and television actor who portrayed Adam Brewster in the American soap opera television series One Life to Live from 1978 to 1979. He also played Jonathan Carlton in the NBC soap opera television series Days of Our Lives from 1984 to 1985, and as Dr. Reston and Dr. Ballard in the NBC soap opera television series Santa Barbara from 1985 to 1987.

Mansfield guest-starred in numerous television programs including General Hospital, Married... with Children (and its spin-off Top of the Heap), Who's the Boss?, Murphy Brown, Santa Barbara, Hill Street Blues, Days of Our Lives, Diff'rent Strokes, and Remington Steele. In addition to his guest-appearances, he played as Petruchio in the 1980 stage play The Taming of the Shrew.
