= John Helyar =

American journalist and author (born 1951)

- Born: May 14, 1951 (age 75)
- Education: Boston University
- Occupations: Author reporter correspondent
- Spouse: Betsy Morris
- Writing career
- Notable works: Lords of the Realm: The Real History of Baseball, Barbarians at the Gate

John Helyar (born 1951) is an American journalist and author. He is a graduate of Boston University. He is married to The Wall Street Journal’s Betsy Morris. Helyar has worked for The Wall Street Journal, Fortune magazine, ESPN.com, ESPN The Magazine and Bloomberg News. He is the author of the 1994 book, Lords of the Realm: The Real History of Baseball.

His reporting with Bryan Burrough on RJR Nabisco earned them the 1989 Gerald Loeb Award for Deadline and/or Beat Writing. They turned their research into the book Barbarians at the Gate: The Fall of RJR Nabisco, which was made into an HBO Emmy award-winning film of the same title.
