= James Dahl =

American businessman and philanthropist

James Herbert Dahl
- Born: August 16, 1953 (age 73); Minneapolis, Minnesota, United States
- Education: Florida State University (BS, MBA)
- Occupations: businessman, investor, philanthropist

James Herbert Dahl (born August 16, 1953) is an American businessman and philanthropist. He was the founder and chairman of Rock Creek Capital, a Jacksonville, Florida-based firm that provided investment services centered on acquiring and managing land in an environmentally responsible manner.

Dahl served two four-year terms as a member of the Investment Advisory Council for the State of Florida's Pension Fund, the nation's fourth-largest pension fund, beginning in 2001. He was chairman of the council from 2005 to 2006.

Dahl previously managed the Convertible Bond Department at Drexel Burnham Lambert and later provided testimony against Michael Milken. He was never charged with any wrongdoing.

== Biography ==
Dahl was born in Minneapolis but raised primarily in Miami and Naples, Florida. He received his bachelor's degree in finance and real estate from Florida State University (with honors) and earned an MBA from Florida State's Graduate School of Business in 1975.

From 1981 to 1989, he served as executive vice president of Drexel Burnham Lambert, and managed the Convertible Bond Department, under the direction of Michael Milken. He was described by The New York Times as a "Classic 1980's mover and shaker... Once a star salesman for Michael R. Milken's junk-bond operations, he later received immunity for testifying against him." Dahl was granted criminal immunity, in exchange for his testimony before a Grand Jury in October 1988. Milken was indicted for stock manipulation in March 1989, and he was eventually convicted and served a 22-month prison sentence; the company declared bankruptcy on February 14, 1990.

After Drexel, Dahl founded Rock Creek Capital and its affiliated entities in 1989, serving as chairman until 2009, when he was succeeded by real estate magnate John C. Cushman III. In 1994, Dahl co-founded Timbervest LLC, a timberland investment organization that managed over $500 million in assets prior to its sale in 2004.

== Philanthropy ==
A longtime philanthropist, Dahl created The Dahl Family Foundation in 2003 as a vehicle for his contributions to support higher education and opportunities for children, in particular, The Emily Krzyzewski Center (The Emily K Center), and has given to Wolfson's Children's Hospital, Duke University, Florida State University, The Bolles School, Maclay School, The Guardian of Dreams Foundation, United Way, and the American Cancer Society.

He is also involved in environmental conservation and preservation. Dahl is a supporter of Tall Timbers and other land conservation groups and has donated conservation easements on many of his properties.

== Personal life ==
Dahl is married to the former Kathleen Mary Rainey and has five children. His son, James Andrews Dahl, died on February 13, 2019, in West Hollywood, California, at the age of 40.
