= Forstmann Little & Company =

Defunct private equity firm, specializing in leveraged buyouts (LBOs)

Forstmann, Little & Company
- Type: Private ownership
- Industry: Private equity
- Founded: 1978
- Founder: Ted and Nick Forstmann and Brian Little
- Defunct: 2015
- Headquarters: New York, New York, United States
- Products: Leveraged buyout, Growth capital

Forstmann, Little & Company was an American private equity firm, specializing in leveraged buyouts (LBOs). At its peak in the late 1990s, Forstmann Little was among the largest private equity firms globally. Ultimately, the firm would suffer from the bursting of the internet and telecom bubbles, having invested heavily in technology and telecommunications companies. Following the death of the last surviving founder, Theodore Forstmann, in 2011, the firm was dissolved and its assets sold off. It closed in May 2014.

== History ==
Ted Forstmann was a golfing partner of Derald Ruttenberg at the Deepdale Country Club on Long Island. He arranged for Ruttenberg to meet Henry Kravis and Jerry Kohlberg of the start-up Kohlberg Kravis Roberts. Kravis and Kohlberg proposed what they called a leveraged buyout. After the two had left, Ruttenberg suggested that Forstmann could do the same himself. Ruttenberg arranged funding for Forstmann, who launched Forstmann Little & Company in 1978. The company was founded by brothers Ted and Nick Forstmann, and Brian Little. With the deaths of Brian Little and Nicholas Forstmann in 2000 and 2001, respectively, Ted Forstmann was the chief partner. A third brother, J. Anthony Forstmann, was a limited partner in the firm.

Between its inception in 1978 to its 2014 closing, the firm made more than 30 acquisitions and significant investments returning over $14 billion in profit for its investors.

Successful acquisitions included Gulfstream Aerospace, Topps Playing Cards, Dr Pepper, Stanadyne, and General Instrument. The company was usually successful in making a profit on such purchases, selling Gulfstream to General Dynamics, and General Instrument to Motorola. In the case of Gulfstream, Ted Forstmann took direct control of the financially ailing company's day-to-day operations to improve the company's attractiveness to a potential acquirer.

The company has also had some flops, such as McLeodUSA and XO Communications. In 2002, the state of Connecticut sued Forstmann, Little & Company to recover $125 million in losses associated with investments in these two telecom companies, citing negligence and breach of contract. While Forstmann settled the case for $15 million, the suit was considered a landmark, launching a series of similar actions between private equity fund managers and public entity investors.

One prominent episode in the life of the company was the 1988 bidding war for RJR Nabisco. Forstmann Little offered to acquire RJR Nabisco, but the management (chiefly F. Ross Johnson) instead chose Shearson Lehman Hutton. In the end, the board of directors chose Forstmann Little's arch-rival, Kohlberg Kravis Roberts & Co. The episode was popularized in the book Barbarians at the Gate: The Fall of RJR Nabisco.

Other headline transactions the firm participated in include Revlon (1985), which resulted in the so-called Revlon Duty, and Citadel Broadcasting, of which Forstmann Little owns 27%, following a merger with ABC Radio in 2006. In 2004, Forstmann Little acquired IMG in a $750 million deal, and in 2005 bought 24 Hour Fitness for $1.6 billion.

== Former station ==
- Stations are arranged in alphabetical order by state and city of license.

Stations owned by Fortsmann Little
Media market	State	Station	Purchased	Sold
Albany–Schenectady	New York	WRGB	1983	1986

== Dissolution ==
In 2011, Theodore Forstmann, the last surviving founder, died of brain cancer. The law firm Akin Gump Strauss Hauer & Feld dissolved the firm by selling off its assets. IMG was sold in 2013 for $2.3 billion to William Morris Endeavor. The last asset to be sold was 24 Hour Fitness, which was purchased for $2 billion by AEA Investors.
