= Bryan Burrough =

American journalist

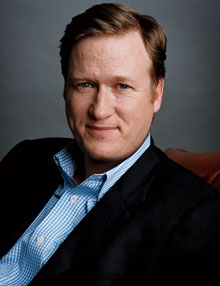
- Burrough in 2004
- Born: August 13, 1961 (age 65); Tennessee, U.S.
- Education: University of Missouri
- Occupations: Author, Reporter, Correspondent
- Writing career
- Language: English
- Notable works: Public Enemies, Barbarians at the Gate

Bryan Burrough (born August 13, 1961, in Memphis, Tennessee) is an American journalist and author of eight books, including four New York Times best-sellers, the Wall Street classic Barbarians at the Gate (with John Helyar); Public Enemies: America’s Greatest Crime Wave and the Birth of the FBI, 1933-34; The Big Rich: The Rise and Fall of the Greatest Texas Oil Families; and Forget the Alamo: The Rise and Fall of an American Myth (with Chris Tomlinson and Jason Stanford.) His most recent book, The Gunfighters: How Texas Made the West Wild, was published by Penguin Press in June 2025.

A 1983 graduate of the University of Missouri journalism school, Burrough was a reporter for The Wall Street Journal between 1983 and 1992, working in Dallas, Houston, Pittsburgh and New York. While at the Journal, he won the Gerald Loeb Award for excellence in financial journalism three times. From 1992 until 2017 he was a special correspondent for Vanity Fair magazine. His book reviews and op-ed articles have appeared in The New York Times, The Los Angeles Times, and The Washington Post. He has made appearances on Today, Good Morning America and many documentary films. He is currently Editor at Large at Texas Monthly magazine. His Texas Monthly true-crime podcast, Stephenville, received national notice in 2023.

Burrough is a member of the Texas Institute of Arts and Letters, the Philosophical Society of Texas and the New Jersey Literary Hall of Fame.

== Education ==
Burrough obtained his degree from the University of Missouri School of Journalism in 1983.

== Family ==
At the age of eight, Burrough moved with his family to Waco and then to Temple, Texas, where he grew up. As an adult, he lived in New York and New Jersey for 30 years. Today he has returned to Texas, where he lives in Austin with his wife Amy Pfluger.

== Works ==
Books non-fiction

- Barbarians at the Gate: The Fall of RJR Nabisco (1990, with John Helyar)
- Vendetta: American Express and the Smearing of Edmond Safra (1992)
- Dragonfly: NASA and the Crisis Aboard Mir (1998)
- Public Enemies: America's Greatest Crime Wave and the Birth of the FBI, 1933–34 (2004)
- The Big Rich: The Rise and Fall of the Greatest Texas Oil Fortunes (2009)
- Days of Rage: America's Radical Underground, the FBI, and the Forgotten Age of Revolutionary Violence (2015)
- Forget the Alamo: The Rise and Fall of an American Myth (2021, with Chris Tomlinson and Jason Stanford) ISBN 9781984880093
- The Gunfighters: How Texas Made the West Wild (2025)

Other writing:

- "Texas Has Had Its Day in the Political Sun" (February 22, 2009). The Washington Post

== Adaptations ==
- Public Enemies. Was based on his book Public Enemies: America’s Greatest Crime Wave and the Birth of the FBI, 1933–34
- Barbarians at the Gate. Was based on his book Barbarians at the Gate: The Fall of RJR Nabisco.

== Awards ==
- 1989 Gerald Loeb Award for Deadline and/or Beat Writing for coverage of the RJR Nabisco buyout (shared with John Helyar)
- 1991 Gerald Loeb Award for Large Newspapers for the story "The Vendetta"
- 1994 Gerald Loeb Award for Magazines for the story "Divided Dynasty"
