= AG Asset Management =

Former American institutional money management firm

ForstmannLeff Associates
- Type: Private
- Industry: Financial services Institutional investment management
- Founded: 1968
- Founders: J. Anthony Forstmann; Joel B. Leff
- Defunct: 2009
- Fate: Renamed AG Asset Management (2007); investment teams transferred to Evercore Asset Management and Palisade Capital Management (2009)
- Headquarters: New York City, United States
- Parent: Angelo, Gordon & Co. (2006–2009)

ForstmannLeff Associates was an American institutional money management firm based in New York. It was co-founded in 1968 by J. Anthony Forstmann and Joel B. Leff. The firm managed U.S. equity portfolios for institutional investors and wealthy private clients. In 1985 it had a capitalization of $3.5 billion.

== History ==
ForstmannLeff was for several years affiliated with the commodities brokerage Refco. When Thomas H. Lee Partners bought into Refco in 2004, ForstmannLeff stayed with a company controlled by Refco's chief executive, Phillip Bennett.

In October 2005, Old Mutual Asset Management agreed to buy a controlling stake in the firm. A few days later the Refco accounting scandal broke, and Old Mutual dropped the deal. ForstmannLeff's management then bought the firm back from Refco.

In January 2006, the alternative investment firm Angelo, Gordon & Co. signed a letter of intent to buy ForstmannLeff, which then managed about $3 billion in U.S. stocks. The deal was unusual because a hedge fund firm was buying a traditional money manager. Angelo Gordon completed its purchase of a majority stake in May 2006, with Dana Troxell as the new chief executive.

Angelo Gordon renamed the firm AG Asset Management in 2007. In February 2009, Angelo Gordon wound down the business. Its core team joined Evercore Asset Management, and its growth team joined Palisade Capital Management.

== Clients ==
The firm's clients included, among others, the following:

- Intel
- Pfizer
- Standard Oil of Indiana
- The Pension Guarantee Corp.
- The Ford Family
- Northrop
- Honeywell
- Lockheed
- Northwest Airlines
- Knight Ridder
- Delta Air Lines
- Texas Instruments
- Raychem
- Studebaker
- Chrysler
- Commercial Credit
- MCA Universal
- City of New York
- State of Minnesota
- State of Maine
- Holy Cross University
- The Archdiocese of New York
