= RJR Nabisco =

U.S. consumer staples company (1985–1999)

R. J. Reynolds Nabisco, Inc.

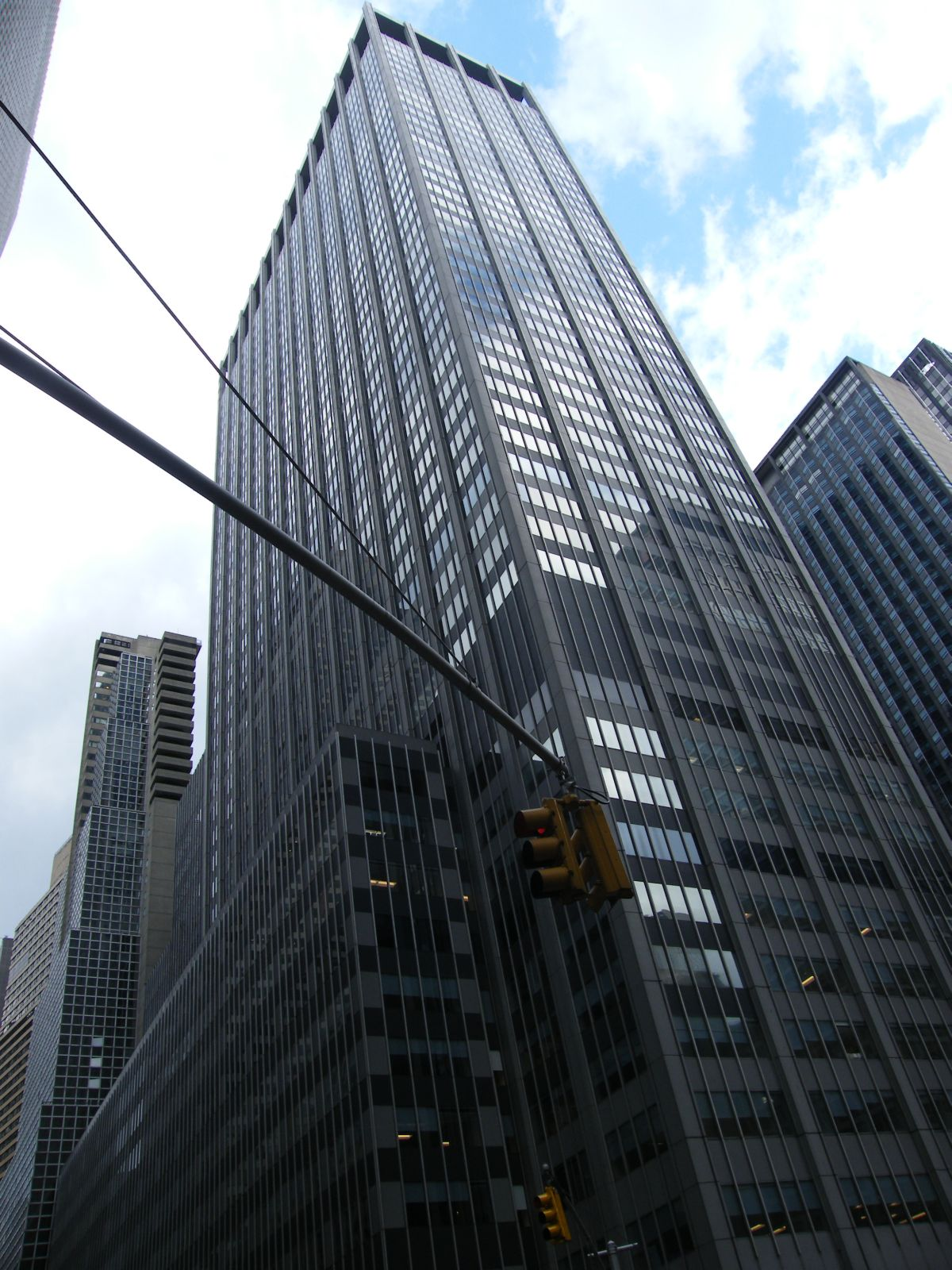
- Calyon Building, former site of the RJR Nabisco headquarters
- Trade name: RJR Nabisco
- Type: Subsidiary
- Traded as: NYSE: RJ
- Industry: Food processing; tobacco
- Predecessors: Nabisco; R.J. Reynolds; Curtiss Candy Company
- Founded: April 25, 1985
- Defunct: 1999; 27 years ago
- Fate: Conglomerate dissolved in 1999, both companies continued separately
- Successor: Nabisco
- Headquarters: Winston-Salem, North Carolina; Cobb County, Georgia; Midtown Manhattan, New York City
- Products: Cookies, crackers, cigarettes
- Owner: R. J. Reynolds

R. J. Reynolds Nabisco, Inc., was an American conglomerate, selling tobacco and food products, headquartered in the Calyon Building in Midtown Manhattan, New York City. R. J. Reynolds Nabisco stopped operating as a single entity in 1999. Both RJR (as R. J. Reynolds Tobacco Company) and Nabisco (now part of Mondelēz International) still exist.

== History ==
RJR Nabisco was formed in 1985 by the merger of Nabisco Brands and R. J. Reynolds Tobacco Company.

In 1988 RJR Nabisco was purchased by Kohlberg Kravis Roberts & Co. in what was at the time the largest leveraged buyout in history.

In 1999, due to concerns about tobacco lawsuit liabilities, the tobacco business was spun off into a separate company and RJR Nabisco was renamed Nabisco Holdings Corporation. Nabisco is currently owned by Mondelēz International Inc.

RJR Nabisco Holdings Corp. (NYSE: NGH) was the parent company of RJR Nabisco, Inc. After the food and tobacco businesses separated in June 1999, Nabisco Group Holdings Corp. owned 80% of RJR Nabisco Holdings Corp., which was the parent company of Nabisco, Inc.

=== Formation ===
R. J. Reynolds Tobacco Company was founded in Winston-Salem, North Carolina, in 1875 and changed its name to R. J. Reynolds Industries, Inc. in 1970. It became RJR Nabisco on April 25, 1986, after the company's $4.9 billion purchase, and earlier 1.9 billion stock swap, of Nabisco Brands Inc. in 1985. On May 7, 1986, one week after the merger, RJR Nabisco sold Del Monte's frozen foods unit to ConAgra Foods, followed by the sales of the soft drink brands Canada Dry and Sunkist to Cadbury Schweppes on June 3, 1986, the KFC fast-food chain to PepsiCo on July 25, 1986, and Heublein to Grand Metropolitan on January 17, 1987.

=== Headquarters move ===
In August 1986, the RJR Nabisco board announced that F. Ross Johnson would replace J. Tylee Wilson as head of the company effective January 1, 1987. Soon after, Johnson, believing "bucolic" Winston-Salem did not have the right image for a "world-class company", began seeking other possible headquarters cities. After ruling out New York City and Dallas, the company decided on Atlanta because it was "nouveau riche and overbuilt". On January 15, 1987, the RJR Nabisco board approved a headquarters move from Winston-Salem to Cobb County, Georgia, north of Atlanta, where the company had rented space. The move would affect 250 to 300 employees, while Winston-Salem would still have 14,000 people working for the company. RJR Nabisco donated the 519,000-square-foot World Headquarters Building to Wake Forest University but continued to use it until the September 1987 move. Later, RJR Nabisco's Planters-Life Savers Division moved to the former headquarters building.

=== KKR leveraged buyout ===
The RJR Nabisco leveraged buyout was, at the time, widely considered to be the preeminent example of corporate and executive greed. Bryan Burrough and John Helyar published Barbarians at the Gate: The Fall of RJR Nabisco, a successful book about the events which later became a television movie for HBO.

F. Ross Johnson was the President and CEO of RJR Nabisco at the time of the leveraged buyout and Henry Kravis was the managing partner at Kohlberg Kravis Roberts & Co. The leveraged buyout was in the amount of $25 billion, and the battle for control took place between October and November 1988.

Although KKR eventually took control of RJR Nabisco, RJR management and Shearson Lehman Hutton had originally announced that they would take RJR Nabisco private at $75 per share. A fierce series of negotiations and proposals ensued which involved nearly all of the major private equity players of the day, including Morgan Stanley, Goldman Sachs, Salomon Brothers, First Boston, Wasserstein Perella & Co., Forstmann Little, Shearson Lehman Hutton, and Merrill Lynch. Once put in play by Shearson Lehman Hutton and RJR management, almost every major Wall Street firm involved in M&A launched frenzied, literal last-minute bids in a fog of incomplete or misleading information.

KKR quickly introduced a tender offer to obtain RJR Nabisco for $90 per share—a price that enabled it to proceed without the approval of RJR Nabisco's management. RJR's management team, working with Shearson Lehman Hutton and Salomon Brothers, submitted a bid of $112, a figure they felt certain would enable it to outflank any response by Kravis. KKR's final bid of $109, while a lower dollar figure, was ultimately accepted by the board of directors. It was accepted because KKR's offer was guaranteed whereas management's lacked a "reset", meaning that the final share price might have been lower than their professed $112 per share. Additionally, many in RJR's board of directors had grown concerned at recent disclosures of Johnson's unprecedented golden parachute deal. Time magazine featured Johnson on the cover of its December 1988 issue along with the headline "A Game of Greed: This man could pocket $100 million from the largest corporate takeover in history. Has the buyout craze gone too far?".

KKR's offer was welcomed by the board, and, to some observers, it appeared that their elevation of the reset issue as a deal-breaker in KKR's favor was little more than an excuse to reject Johnson's higher payout of $112 per share. Johnson received compensation worth more than $60 million from the buyout, then left in February 1989. In March 1989, Louis V. Gerstner of American Express became the new head of RJR Nabisco.

=== After the KKR buyout ===
On April 27, 1989, RJR Nabisco announced it would move its headquarters to the New York City area.

As a result of the acquisition, RJR Nabisco divested the following divisions:

- Nabisco's UK operations (including Smith's and Walkers), Belin of France, and Saiwa of Italy were sold to BSN. Smith's and Walkers were swiftly resold to PepsiCo.
- Chun King was sold to Yeo Hiap Seng.
- Associated Biscuits International (consisting of 38% of India's Britannia and 40% of Pakistan's English Biscuit Manufacturers) was sold to Britannia Industries.
- Fresh Del Monte Produce was sold to Polly Peck.
- Del Monte Foods was sold to Merrill Lynch, Citicorp Venture Capital, and Kikkoman. Del Monte's Asia operations (outside the Philippines) were separately sold to Kikkoman.
- The company's 20% stake in ESPN Inc. was sold to Hearst Communications.

Another major consequence of the buyout was that according to United States Department of Labor, in its report "American Workplace", over 2,000 workers subsequently lost their jobs, of which 72% were eventually replaced, but earning less than half of their previous incomes, suggesting that it took most of those who lost their jobs an average of 5.6 months to find new employment.

On March 21, 1991, RJR Nabisco Holdings Corp. became a publicly traded stock. In March 1999, RJR Nabisco announced the sale of the international division of R. J. Reynolds Tobacco to Japan Tobacco, creating what is now known as Japan Tobacco International, and in June of that year, the company sold the remainder of R. J. Reynolds Tobacco to stockholders. The parent company became Nabisco Group Holdings and owned 80.5 percent of Nabisco Holdings. In 2000, Philip Morris bought Nabisco Holdings. Soon after that, R. J. Reynolds Tobacco Holdings, Inc., first traded in June 1999, announced the acquisition of Nabisco Group Holdings. The deal was completed in December 2000.

== Controversy ==
=== Ads on smoking-free flights ===
In April 1988, RJR Nabisco fired the Saatchi & Saatchi advertising agency after its Northwest Airlines ad introducing the airline's in-flight smoking ban. This was despite the agency's only having been contracted for Nabisco products, not any tobacco products.

=== Pandora Papers ===
In 2021, RJR Nabisco (before it split up) was listed in the Pandora Papers after the law firm Baker McKenzie set up shell companies in Cyprus.
