= Henry Kravis =

American businessman (born 1944)

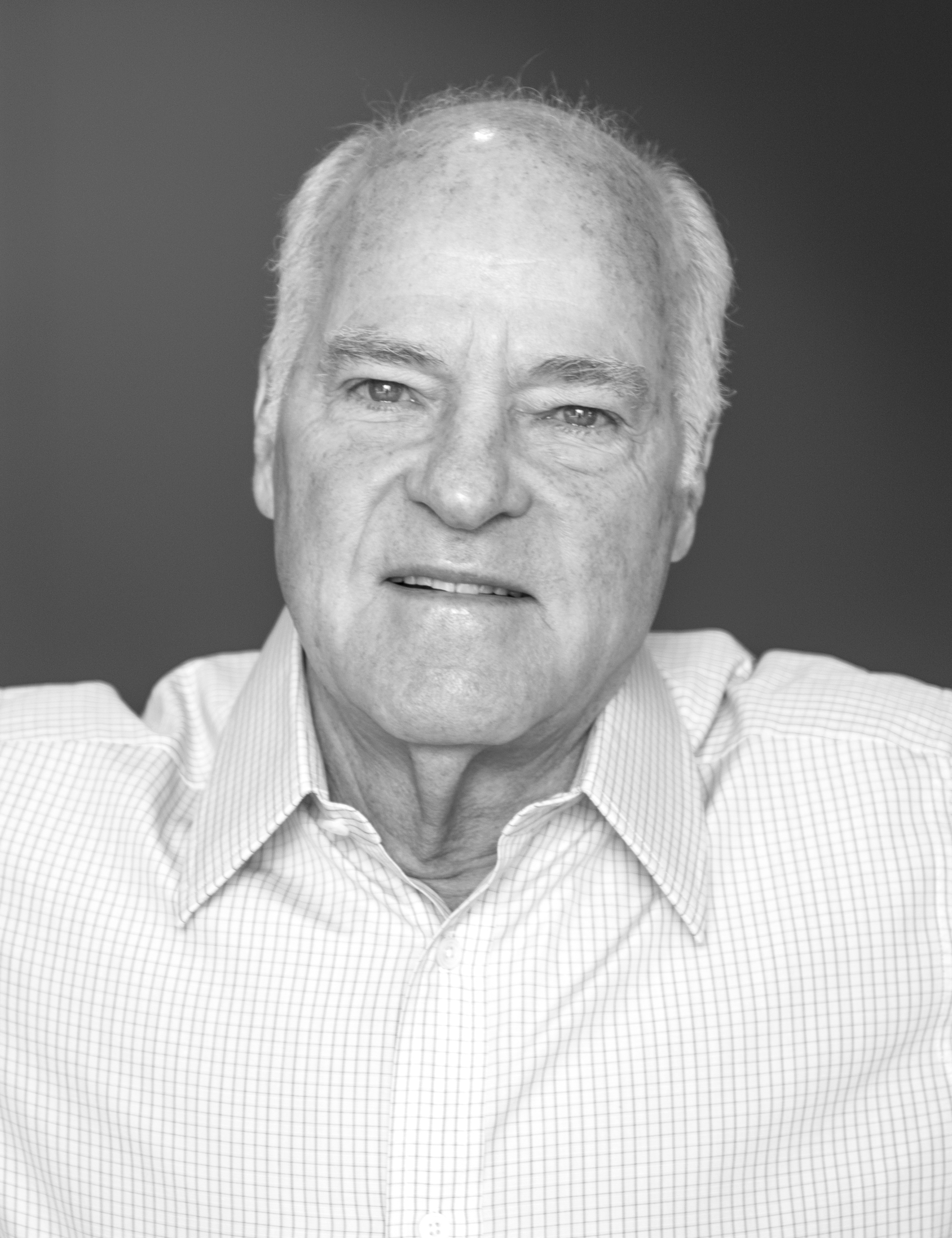
- Kravis in 2016
- Born: January 6, 1944 (age 82); Tulsa, Oklahoma, U.S.
- Education: Claremont McKenna College (BA); Columbia University (MBA)
- Political party: Republican
- Spouse(s): Hedi Shulman (divorced) Carolyne Roehm (m. 1985; div. 1993) Marie-Josée Drouin (m. 1994)
- Children: 3
- Relatives: George R. Roberts (cousin)

Henry Roberts Kravis (born January 6, 1944) is an American businessman, investor, and philanthropist. He is a co-founder of the private equity and investment firm Kohlberg Kravis Roberts & Co. (KKR & Co.)

His lavish lifestyle has been criticized by activists looking to reform private equity regulations and restrict the practice of leveraged buyouts he pioneered. His buyout of RJR Nabisco was portrayed in the 1989 book and 1993 film Barbarians at the Gate.

As of 2026, Kravis has a net worth of approximately $12.5 billion according to the Bloomberg Billionaires Index, derived primarily from his stake in KKR & Co.

== Early life ==
Kravis was born into a Jewish family in Tulsa, Oklahoma, the son of Bessie (née Roberts) and Raymond F. Kravis, a successful Tulsa oil engineer who had been a business partner of Joseph P. Kennedy. Kravis began his education at Eaglebrook School ('60), followed by high school at the Loomis Chaffee School, where he participated in student government and was elected vice president of the student council his senior year. He attended Claremont McKenna College (then known as Claremont Men's College) and majored in economics. He was a member of the CMC varsity golf teams for four years and was a member of the Knickerbockers student service organization. He served as his sophomore class secretary-treasurer. He graduated from CMC in 1967 before going on to Columbia Business School, where he received an MBA degree in 1969.

== Career ==
=== Kravis at Bear Stearns ===
After working at various jobs in New York City's financial sector, he and his first cousin, George R. Roberts, joined the staff of Bear Stearns. There, they worked under the corporate finance manager, Jerome Kohlberg, Jr. They both became partners at Bear Stearns at young ages, 30 and 31, respectively.

Working for Bear Stearns in the late 1960s and early 1970s, Kravis, alongside Kohlberg and Roberts, began a series of what they described as "bootstrap" investments. In the following years, Kohlberg and later Kravis and Roberts would complete a series of buyouts including Stern Metals (1965), Incom (a division of Rockwood International, 1971), Cobblers Industries (1971), and Boren Clay (1973) as well as Thompson Wire, Eagle Motors and Barrows through their investment in Stern Metals. Although they had a number of highly successful investments, the $27 million investment in Cobblers ended in bankruptcy.

=== Kohlberg Kravis Roberts ===
By 1976, tensions had built up between Bear Stearns and the trio of Kohlberg, Kravis and Roberts leading to their departure and the formation of Kohlberg Kravis Roberts (KKR) in that year. Notably, Bear Stearns executive Cy Lewis had rejected repeated proposals to form a dedicated investment fund within Bear Stearns and Lewis took exception to the amount of time spent on outside activities.

Kohlberg invested $100,000 while Kravis and Roberts invested $10,000 each of their own capital in their new firm. Early investors in KKR included the Hillman Family and the Griffith family (who are also large shareholders in MGM and Warner Bros. Discovery). By 1978, with the revision of the ERISA regulations, the nascent KKR was successful in raising its first institutional fund with approximately $30 million of investor commitments.

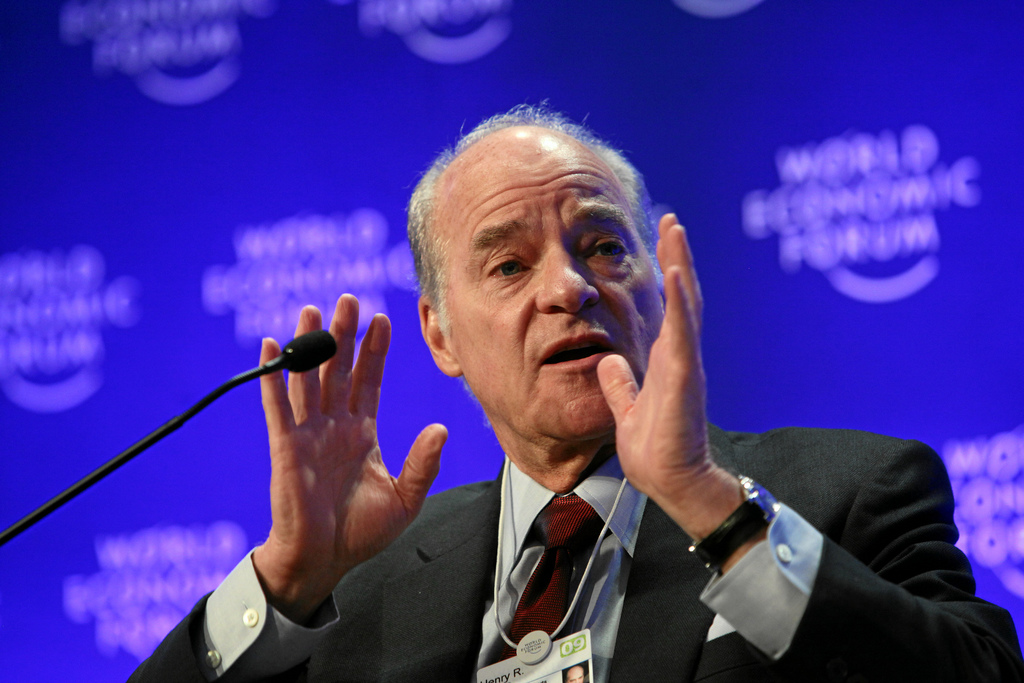
Kravis in 2009

In 1987, Jerome Kohlberg, Jr. resigned from KKR, and Henry Kravis and George Roberts continued to lead the firm. Under Kravis and Roberts, the firm was responsible for the 1988 leveraged buyout of RJR Nabisco. At a cost of $31.4 billion, it was then the highest price ever paid for a commercial enterprise. The publicity surrounding the event led to the story being dramatized in the book and film, Barbarians at the Gate. Kravis was portrayed in the film by actor Jonathan Pryce.

In early 1995, KKR divested its remaining holdings in RJR Nabisco, taking an overall loss on the deal. A journalist for the New York Times wrote a few years later that "the deal will go down in history as showing just how difficult it can be to get out of a huge deal that goes badly, and of the perils of putting too much money on one investment." KKR pledged not to commit so much of its fund to a single investment again in the future. However, other investments proved more profitable, and the fund still did well overall.

The list of companies in which Henry Kravis's KKR has invested over the years includes health care provider Hospital Corporation of America (HCA), utility company TXU, Playtex, Beatrice Foods, Safeway, Toys "R" Us, Borden, First Data and Regal Entertainment Group. A takeover of the battery maker Duracell proved particularly profitable.

On December 24, 2013, KKR closed their first real estate specific investment fund, which raised $1.2 billion of new money to invest. With additional funds from within KKR, the new fund provided over $1.5 billion to utilize.

In July 2017, Kravis and Roberts announced they would eventually be succeeded by Joseph Y. Bae and Scott C. Nuttall, who were named co-presidents and co-chief operating officers so they might gradually take over daily operations. This succession plan was enacted in October 2021, with Kravis and Roberts stepping down from their positions as co-CEOs but continuing as co-executive chairmen of KKR. In his role as co-executive chairman, Kravis remains actively involved in KKR's investment committees. Under the leadership of Bae and Nuttall, KKR's assets under management (AUM) grew from approximately $470 billion at the time of the succession to $758 billion as of March 31, 2026, a 61% increase in under five years.

== Personal life ==
Kravis has been married three times. His first marriage to Helene Diane "Hedi" Shulman ended in divorce. They had three children, Harrison S. Kravis (b. 1972, d. 1991 car accident), Robert R. Kravis (b. 1973), and Kimberly Kravis Schulhof (b. 1975). Hedi remarried to James Thompson Ruger, son of William B. Ruger and died of cancer on April 2, 1997, at age 49. Kravis later married New York designer Carolyne Roehm (born Carolyne Jane Smith) in 1985, but the marriage ended in divorce in 1993. Kravis is currently married to a prominent Canadian economist, and former columnist and TV personality in Canada, Marie-Josée Drouin. She sits on the boards of the Memorial Sloan-Kettering Cancer Center and the Robin Hood Foundation.She served as president of the Museum of Modern Art board of directors from 2005 to 2018, and in July 2021 was elected board chair, succeeding Leon Black.

Kravis mainly lives in New York City and has a seasonal residence in Palm Beach, Florida; he also owns homes in Southampton, New York; Paris; and Sharon, Connecticut.

=== Politics ===
A supporter of Republican politics, he was a supporter and fundraiser for President George W. Bush and John McCain. He was also a major contributor to the 1992 re-election campaign of President George H. W. Bush. In 1997, Henry Kravis joined with Lewis M. Eisenberg to establish the Republican Leadership Council. In 2017, he also contributed $1 million to President Donald Trump's presidential inauguration.. Kravis also appears in the directory of Peter Thiel's private organization Dialog.

== Philanthropy and public positions ==
The Henry R. Kravis Prize in Nonprofit Leadership, established in 2006, identifies extraordinary leaders in the nonprofit sector, celebrates their accomplishments and shares their best practices with others. The prize is presented and administered by Claremont McKenna College (CMC) and Marie-Josée and Henry Kravis. Kravis is an alumnus and trustee of Claremont McKenna College. The Kravis Prize is affiliated with the Kravis Leadership Institute, a research institute at Claremont McKenna.

Kravis also funds the Henry Kravis Leadership Institute that sponsors the Leadership Studies programs at Claremont McKenna College, and the "Henry Kravis Internships for Teachers of Color" program. He has also financed the construction of extensive facilities at Middlesex School (Kravis House), the Eaglebrook School (Kravis Dorm), Deerfield Academy (Kravis Arena), and The Loomis Chaffee School (Kravis Hall).

Kravis is a benefactor and a past chairman of New York's public television station and sits on the board of the Metropolitan Museum of Art. A trustee of the Mount Sinai Medical Center, Henry and wife Marie-Josée Kravis donated $15 million to establish the "Center for Cardiovascular Health" as well as funding a professorship. They have also endowed the chair in human oncology at Memorial Sloan-Kettering Cancer Center in New York. In 2022, Kravis donated $100 million to Memorial Sloan Kettering Cancer Center to support the Cancer Ecosystems Project, which studies cancer relapse. In 2023, the foundation donated an additional $40 million to establish the Marie-Josée Kravis Center for Cancer Immunobiology at the same institution.

Kravis previously co-chaired with Jerry Speyer the influential Partnership for New York City, founded by David Rockefeller in 1979, and now sits on its board of directors. He created the New York City Investment Fund, a non-profit organization to create jobs and new business in New York City.

Kravis is a trustee of the Council on Foreign Relations in New York, chairman of Sponsors for Educational Opportunity, and was a member of the executive committee of The Business Council for 2011, 2012, 2013 and 2014. He has also served as chairman of The Business Council.

Kravis co-chairs the Columbia Business School Board of Overseers where he recently pledged a gift of $100 million to support the school's new campus project and is a vice-chairman of Rockefeller University. The eleven-story Henry R. Kravis Hall, one of the school's two main buildings, is named after him.

In April 2024, Kravis made a $100 million gift to support the Loomis Chaffee School's endowment. The gift to the school's endowment is the largest single gift ever made to Loomis Chaffee, Kravis's alma mater, and one of the largest made to an independent school in history.

== Awards and honors ==
- Golden Plate Award of the American Academy of Achievement, 1987
- Henry Kravis is named chairman of Sponsors for Educational Opportunity, 2014
- Investment Management's Lifetime Achievement Award, 2015
- Columbia Business School's Centennial Award, 2016
- Atlantic Council's Distinguished Leadership Award, 2016
- Carnegie Medal of Philanthropy, 2019

== See also ==
- List of Claremont McKenna College people
- History of private equity and venture capital
