= Zywave =

Software company headquartered in Milwaukee, Wisconsin, US

Zywave, Inc.
- Company type: Private
- Industry: Software
- Founded: 1995
- Headquarters: Milwaukee, Wisconsin, USA
- Website: http://www.zywave.com/

Zywave, Inc. is a software company headquartered in Milwaukee, Wisconsin that provides software as a service (SaaS) products for insurance brokers and financial planners. Insurance product categories include agency management, data analysis, compliance, risk management and marketing tools, while its financial division produces planning tools primarily for wealth management. Following acquisitions in 2010 and 2011, Zywave now commands the largest market share for personal financial planning software. Its customer base contains more than 350,000 professional users across North America. Zywave also has offices in Carlsbad, California and Winnipeg, Canada.

== History ==
Zywave was founded in 1995 by individuals at a regional insurance brokerage, Frank F. Haack & Associates, (later part of Willis) in Milwaukee, Wisconsin, who developed the products as customer service tools. They shared the software with other brokers in industry networking groups like Assurex Global and Intersure. The company then completely separated from Frank F. Haack in 2004. In 2008, Zywave entered into a strategic investment partnership with Vista Equity Partners, a San Francisco private equity firm. In 2010, Zywave announced the acquisition of Specific Software Solutions, a provider of workers' compensation software, and in 2011, Zywave acquired financial planning software developer Emerging Information Systems, Inc.

Major Zywave Acquisitions (2018–2022)
Year	Company	Description
2018	Code SixFour	Proposal automation and predictive analytics for employee benefits brokers.
2019	RateFactory	Small-group health insurance rating engine.
2019	miEdge	Lead generation, prospecting and market intelligence data for insurance brokers.
2020	Insurance Technologies Corporation (ITC)	Comparative rating, agency management and digital marketing software.
2020	Advisen	Commercial P&C insurance data, analytics and market intelligence.
2021	Enquiron	Risk management and business advisory services platform.
2021	Modgic	Workers' compensation and experience-modification analytics.
June 2021	IBQ Systems	Personal-lines comparative rating platform.
November 2021	ClarionDoor	Carrier and MGA product distribution, rating, quoting and issuance platform.
2022	SIS / Partner Platform	Agency Management System (AMS) and CRM software for P&C agencies.

The name "Zywave" was inspired by the axes and shape of a data graph.

== Awards ==
- Inc. 5000 honoree, 2007 and 2008
- BenefitsPro Readers' Choice Awards 2006
- Top Workplaces in Southeastern Wisconsin 2013
