= Hilb, Rogal & Hobbs Co. =

Former insurance and risk management corporation of the United States

Hilb, Rogal & Hobbs Corporation
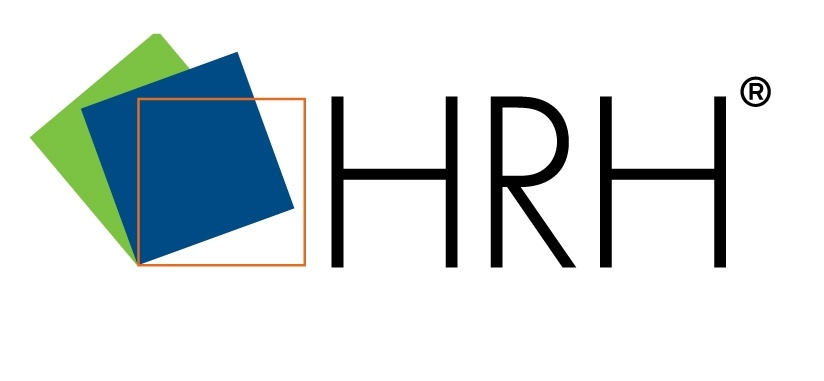
- Trade name: Hilb, Rogal & Hobbs Co.
- Formerly: Hilb, Rogal and Hamilton Co. (1982–2003)
- Company type: Public
- Traded as: NYSE: HRH
- Industry: Insurance brokerage & risk management
- Founded: January 28, 1982; 43 years ago
- Defunct: October 31, 2008; 17 years ago
- Fate: Acquired by Willis Group Holdings
- Successor: Willis Group Holdings
- Headquarters: Glen Allen, Virginia, United States
- Key people: Martin (Mell) Vaughan, III (CEO); F. Michael Crowly (COO & Pres.); Michael Dinkins (CFO & Ex. VP); Viren Kapadia (CIO & VP-Sourcing)
- Products: Insurance brokerage, risk management, employee benefits
- Website: http://www.hrh.com/WillisHRH/

Hilb, Rogal, & Hobbs Co. was an American insurance company. It was established by Bob Hilb, Alvin Rogal and David Hamilton, former Insurance Management Corporation executives in 1982 as Hilb, Rogal, and Hamilton Corporation was changed to Hilb, Rogal and Hobbs Corporation on September 8, 2003. The company operated over 120 offices in 29 U.S. states and London with branch locations in Russia, South Africa, and Australia. Since its establishment, HRH had acquired over 230 independent agencies ranging from individuals to large national accounts with a focus on middle-market and internal risk management for major firms. As of 2007 sales were $799,664,000. It was acquired by Willis Towers Watson for $2.1 billion in 2008.

== History ==
- On January 28, 1982, Hilb, Rogal, & Hamilton Co. was founded by Bob Hilb, Alvin Rogal and David Hamilton.
- In January 1999, the Daytona Beach, FL and Fort Lauderdale, FL offices of Hilb Rogal & Hamilton were acquired by Poe & Brown, Inc. (now Brown & Brown, Inc.)
- On May 12, 2002 Hilb, Rogal & Hamilton is ranked 10th largest insurance intermediary in the world.
- On September 8, 2003 Hilb, Rogal & Hamilton was officially changed to Hilb, Rogal & Hobbs Co.
- In July 2007, Hilb Rogal & Hobbs Co. was ranked ninth in Business Insurance's world's largest brokers list.
- On June 9, 2008, Hilb Rogal & Hobbs Co accepted an acquisition offer by Willis Group Holdings, a British insurer for 2.1 billion.
- In 2004, Haack & Associates was bought by Hilb, Rogal & Hobbs Co.
