= Jobable =

Hong Kong-based human capital analytics and software company

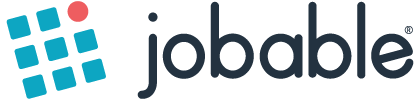
- Industry: Human capital analytics Software
- Founded: March 2014; 12 years ago
- Founder: Richard Hanson; Luke Byrne
- Defunct: February 16, 2021; 5 years ago
- Fate: Acquired by Willis Towers Watson
- Headquarters: Hong Kong

Jobable (formerly Hiring Screen) was a Hong Kong–based human capital analytics and software company. The company developed software that used an algorithm and big data to sort and filter résumés and curriculum vitaes for specific skills and keywords, with the goal of aiding human resources departments to efficiently find the best candidate for job openings that had many applicants. In February 2021, Willis Towers Watson acquired the company and hired its staff.

== History ==
In March 2021, the company was founded by Richard Hanson and Luke Byrne.

In September 2015, the company raised US$800,000 in seed money.

In February 2021, Willis Towers Watson acquired the company and hired its staff.
