= Seiter & Miller Advertising =

American advertising agency

- Company type: Private
- Industry: Advertising
- Headquarters: New York City, United States
- Key people: Livingston Miller, President
- Website: SeiterMiller.com

Seiter & Miller Advertising is an independently owned, full service advertising agency based in New York City. Seiter & Miller was founded over 20 years ago by defectors from some of the largest advertising agencies in the country. Seiter & Miller is a member of AMIN Worldwide (Advertising and Marketing International Network), a global alliance of independently owned agencies growing through collaboration.

== Clients ==
Seiter & Miller has done notable work for a range of clients including BDO International, Arnold Bread, Kyocera, NYU, Smith & Wollensky, AXA, PwC, Towers Perrin, Stroehmann Bakeries, American Express, and Jordan Opportunity Fund. The Agency also worked on a pro bono campaign in collaboration with Stop TB Partnership to raise awareness of the global epidemic of TB.

== Awards ==
- UCEA 2010 Strategic Marketing Award – Best in Show (Silver)
- UCEA 2010 Marketing and Publications Award – Print Publications: General (Silver)
