= Willis Group =

Multinational risk advisor, insurance brokerage and reinsurance brokerage company

Willis Group Holdings plc
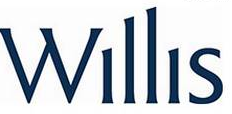
- Company type: Public
- Traded as: NYSE: WSH
- Industry: Insurance broker
- Founded: 1828; 198 years ago, in London, England
- Defunct: 2016
- Fate: Acquired Towers Watson; was renamed Willis Towers Watson
- Successor: Willis Towers Watson
- Headquarters: London, England
- Key people: Dominic Casserley (CEO)
- Products: Insurance; Risk management Human resource consulting
- Number of employees: 18,000

Willis Group Holdings plc was a multinational risk advisor, insurance brokerage and reinsurance brokerage company headquartered in the Willis Building in London. It was the third-largest insurance broker worldwide by revenues. In 2016, the company acquired Towers Watson and was renamed Willis Towers Watson.

== History ==
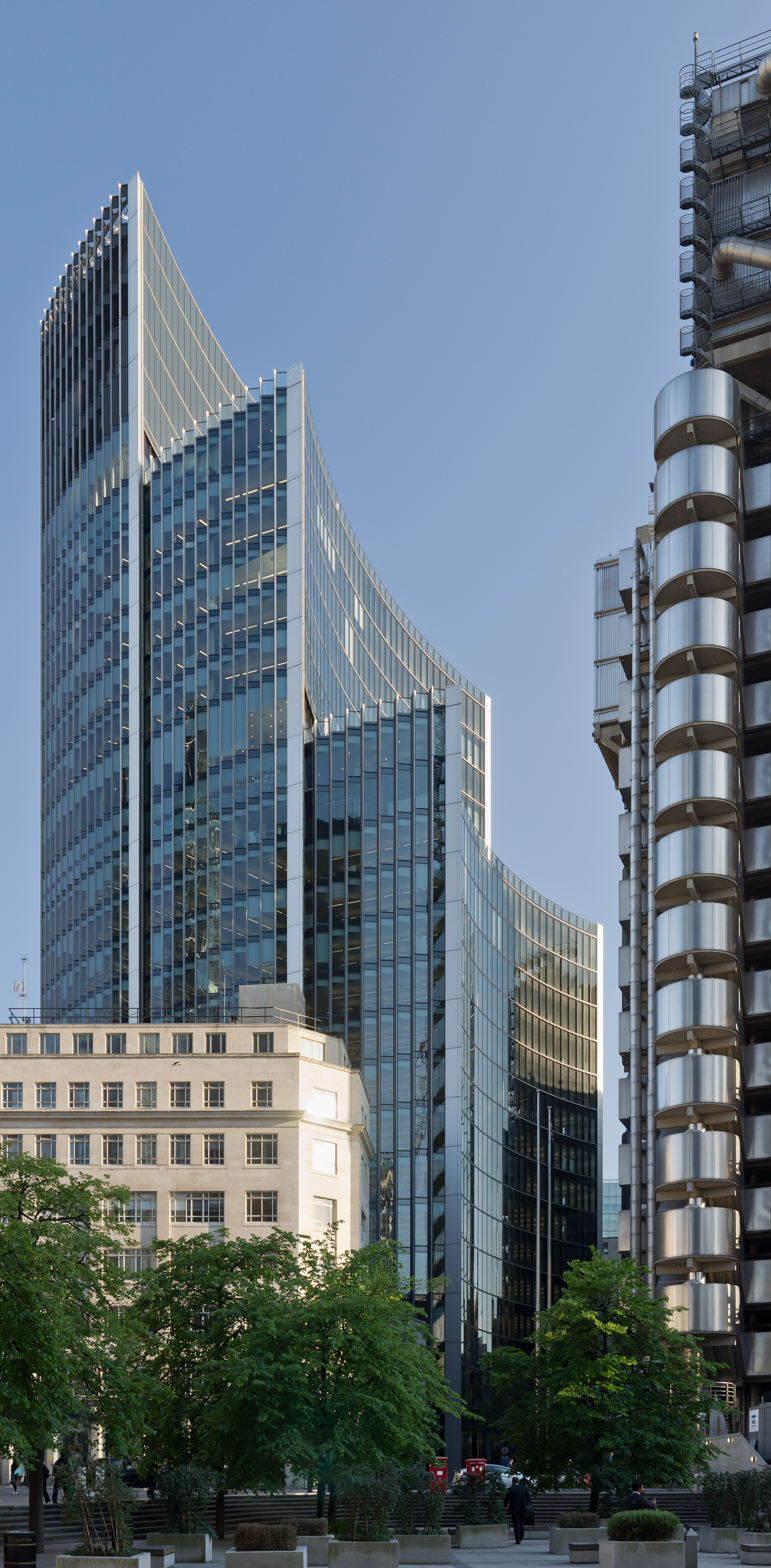
The Willis Building in London

In 1828, Henry Willis began selling imported goods for commission on the Baltic Exchange in London. In 1841, he began brokering insurance for the cargoes of commodities he sold on commission. He expanded to marine insurance and founded Henry Willis & Company shortly thereafter. In 1896, the company expanded to the U.S. market through a relationship with Johnson & Higgins.

In 1898, the company merged with Faber Brothers (founded in 1886) to form Willis Faber.

In 1928, it merged with Dumas & Wylie (founded in 1843) to create Willis, Faber & Dumas.

In the 1950s, the company's actuary business grew significantly as private pensions gained usage.

The company was listed on the London Stock Exchange in 1976.

In the 1980s, the company's reinsurance business grew significantly, eclipsing its marine brokerage business.

It expanded into the United States in 1990 when it merged with Corroon & Black (founded as R. A. Corroon & Co. in 1905) to form the Willis Corroon Group, the fourth largest insurance broker worldwide.

In 1998, in a leveraged buyout, the company was acquired by Trinity Acquisition on behalf of Kohlberg Kravis Roberts, and in 1999 the name Willis Group was adopted. It was listed on the New York Stock Exchange in 2001.

In October 2008, Willis acquired Hilb, Rogal & Hobbs Co. (HRH), one of the largest insurance and risk management intermediaries in North America, for $2.1 billion. The acquisition included Glencairn Limited.

In December 2009, the company relocated its registered office from Bermuda to Ireland.

In 2015, the Court of Appeal of England and Wales held that the company was entitled to an interim injunction to prevent Jardine Lloyd Thompson (JLT), a competing firm of brokers, from unfairly recruiting its remaining staff after more than 20 employees, including nearly all senior staff in one department, left Willis to work for JLT. JLT paid £22 million to settle the claims.

In 2016, the company acquired Towers Watson in an $18 billion stock transaction and was renamed Willis Towers Watson. Towers Watson was formed as a merger between Towers Perrin and Watson Wyatt Worldwide in 2009. The merger was completed after a dividend payment to Towers Watson shareholders was increased after shareholders, including Driehaus Capital Management, opposed the initial proposal and the first shareholder vote for merger approval failed.

== Notable office locations ==
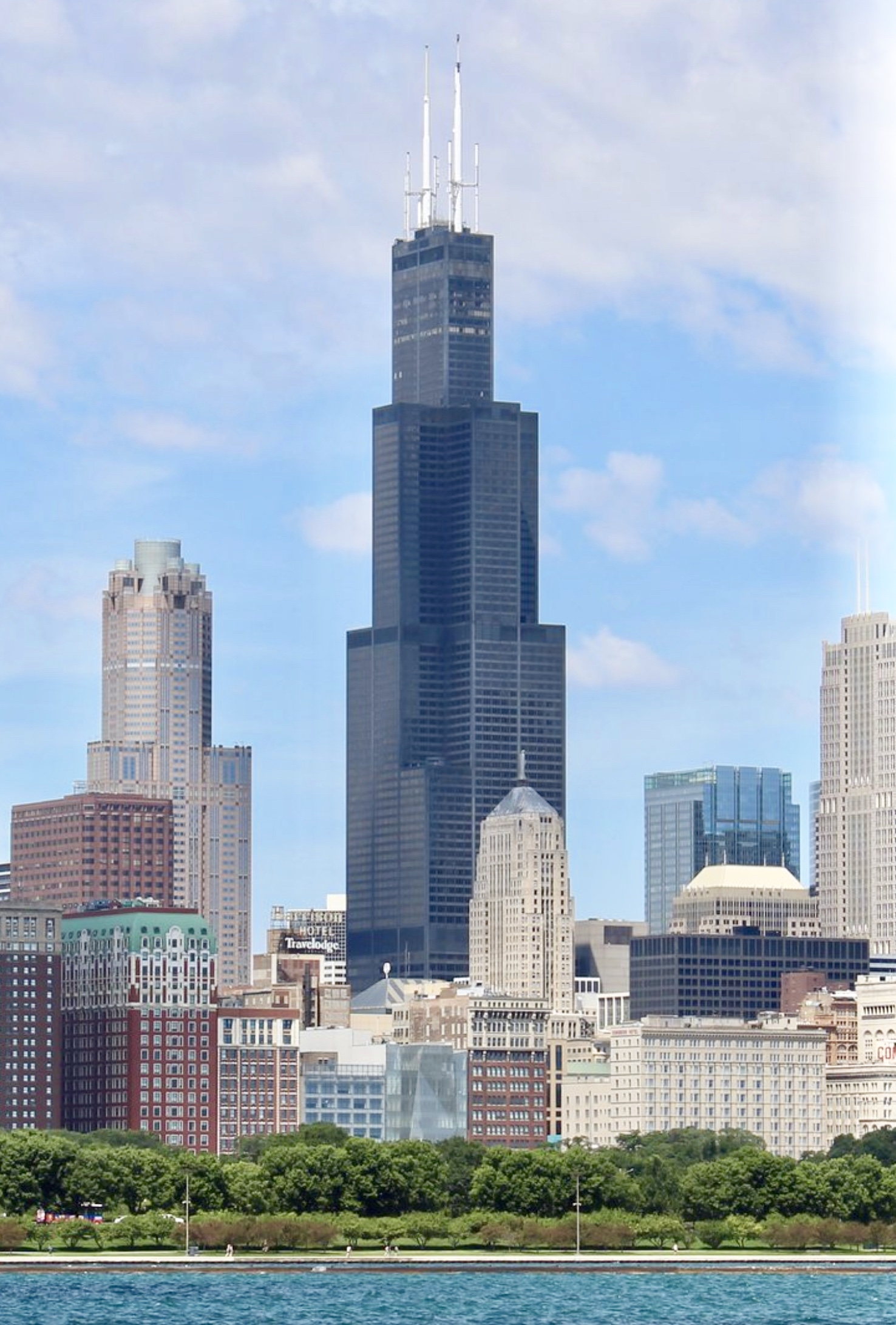
The Willis Tower in Chicago

- Willis Building - London headquarters, occupied in May 2008.
- Willis Building in Ipswich, England, - one of the earliest buildings designed by Norman Foster after establishing Foster Associates. Constructed between 1970 and 1975, it is one of the youngest buildings to be given Grade I listed building status in Britain.
- Willis Tower - 110-story building in Chicago. Willis secured the naming rights effective July 2009 as part of its agreement to lease 140,000 square feet (13,000 m^{2}) of space in the 3,800,000-square-foot (350,000 m^{2}) tower. It was the tallest building in the U.S from 1974 until 2014, when it was surpassed by the One World Trade Center in New York City and was the tallest building in the world from 1974 until 1998, when it was surpassed by the Petronas Towers in Kuala Lumpur, Malaysia.

== Sponsorship ==
The company sponsored The Willis Resilience Expedition, a scientific program that ran from November 2013 to January 2014 in Antarctica to better understand climate change and build resilience to weather-related risk.
