= ABD Insurance and Financial Services =

- Industry: Business insurance
- Predecessors: Mario L. Basso Agency; Alburger de Grosz, Inc.
- Founded: 1990; 36 years ago
- Founders: Doug Alburger; Bruce Basso; Fred de Grosz
- Headquarters: San Mateo, California

ABD Insurance and Financial Services is a large Northern California-based business insurance and financial services broker, founded in 1990 by Doug Alburger, Bruce Basso, and Fred de Grosz.

From 2007 to 2012, following the acquisition of its then-parent company Greater Bay Bancorp by Wells Fargo, ABD Insurance and Financial Services was a separate division of Wells Fargo Insurance Services. In 2012, ABD broke away from Wells Fargo to become completely independent.

Since 2021, it has operated under the Newfront brand following its merger with Newfront Insurance.

British-American multinational insurance broker Willis Towers Watson (WTW) acquired Newfront in January 2026.

== History ==
Originally founded in 1946 as the Mario L. Basso Company in San Mateo, California, following a number of mergers and acquisitions the firm became Alburger Basso de Grosz in 1990, after a merger with Alburger de Grosz, Inc. of Belmont, California. The principals of Alburger Basso de Grosz were CEO Fred de Grosz, president Bruce Basso, and chairman Doug Alburger.

In 1993, the company acquired Ellingson & Jones Insurance Services of Santa Rosa. Subsequent acquisitions included Willis Corroon Group of Sacramento and Metzger & Wilkey Inc. of Petaluma, both in 1996.

In 1998, the firm's name was changed to ABD Insurance and Financial Services. De Grosz was both president and CEO, Basso was elected chairman of the board, and Alburger resigned as chairman but remained at the firm in a less active role.

In 2000, ABD acquired the 20-year-old Sonoma County agency Dranginis & Associates.

In 2001, the firm moved its corporate headquarters from Belmont to Redwood City, California.

In March 2002, Greater Bay Bancorp acquired ABD Insurance and Financial Services.

By 2004, ABD was the 15th-largest insurance broker of U.S. business by revenue generated.

In 2007, Wells Fargo acquired Greater Bay Bancorp, and ABD Insurance and Financial Services became a separate division of the larger brokerage Wells Fargo Insurance Services, retaining its own name and its original offices. ABD's then-CEO Dan Francis resigned; Samuel Jones, who had founded ABD's 1993 acquisition Ellingson & Jones and was president of ABD’s property and casualty operations but had left ABD in 2006, rejoined as president and CEO; and Basso and de Grosz remained chairmen of ABD. De Grosz and Basso later retired from ABD in 2009.

In 2008, ABD acquired Martin Financial/Insurance Services, headquartered in Santa Rosa.

Wells Fargo failed to renew its ABD trademark which expired in October 2011, and after Wells Fargo discontinued buy-out talks with ABD's co-founders, in July 2012 more than 50 Wells Fargo Insurance employees in San Francisco and San Carlos defected to join a newly formed ABD Insurance and Financial Professionals, reclaiming the name.

The new ABD was headed by Brian Hetherington as CEO, plus Kurt de Grosz and Eric Alburger, who were sons of two founding partners of ABD; de Grosz was named president of the new ABD, and Alburger founding partner. In November 2012, the newly independent ABD Insurance and Financial Services, now headquartered in San Mateo, joined the Worldwide Broker Network, which allows independent insurance brokerage firms to operate internationally. In 2017, Wells Fargo sold the remainder of Wells Fargo Insurance Services.

In 2013, the firm acquired Walnut Creek’s Insurance Associates in Walnut Creek.

In 2021, ABD Insurance and Financial Services, which specializes in employee benefits, insurance, and financial services, merged with the high-tech San Francisco–based firm Newfront Insurance, founded in 2017, in order to combine their specialties into a more full-service and modern firm. The new entity is called Newfront and is headquartered in San Francisco, and ABD operates under the Newfront umbrella. At the time of the merger, Spike Lipkin was the CEO of Newfront; Kurt de Grosz became president of ABD and executive chairman of Newfront; and Brian Hetherington became chairman of ABD and president of Newfront.

British-American multinational insurance broker Willis Towers Watson (WTW) acquired Newfront In January 2026 in a $1.3 billion deal. The acquisition allowed WTW to expand its reach in the U.S. middle-market and add scale in sectors such as technology, fintech, and life sciences.
