= Viren Kapadia =

Indian-born businessman

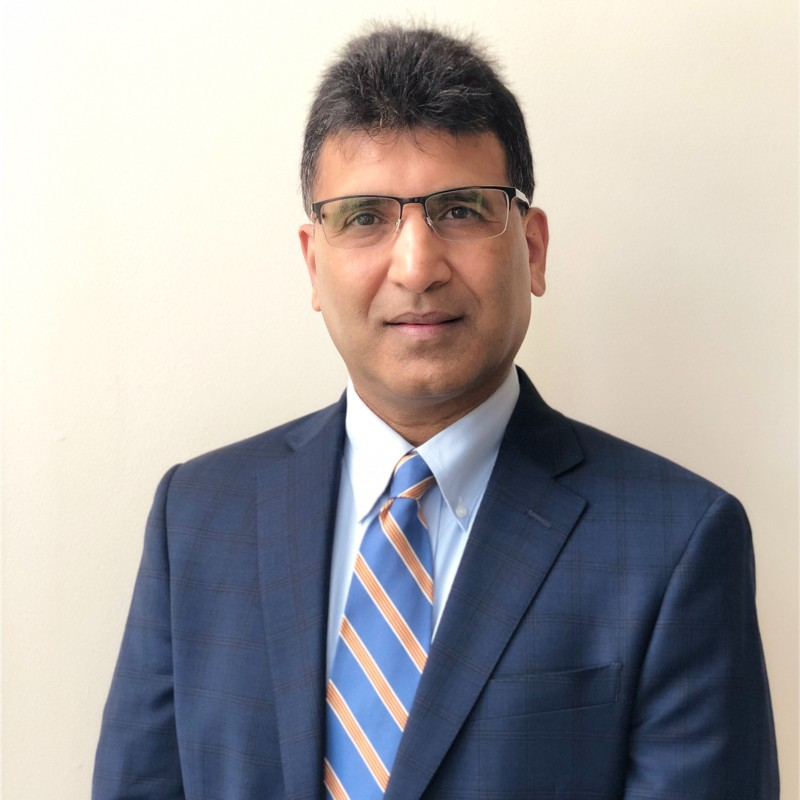
- Born: 1967; Valsad, Gujarat, India
- Education: University of Connecticut (BA) University of New Haven (MBA)
- Occupation(s): President and CEO of Gyrus Systems Former Chief Information Officer and Sourcing Officer at Hilb, Rogal & Hobbs Co. (now Willis Group)
- Spouse: Smita Kapadia (m. 1993)
- Children: 2
- Website: https://www.gyrus.com/about

Viren Kapadia (born 1967) is president and CEO of Gyrus Systems, a Learning Management System (LMS) since 2009. He previously worked as a chief information officer (CIO) for Hilb, Rogal & Hobbs Co. (now Willis Group) from 2006 to 2008 and as a vice president of information technology at General Electric from 1997 to 2006.

Kapadia is on the board of directors for Virginia College Fund, on the board for Virginia Value Veterans, and an advisory board member for the University of Connecticut School of Business MS FinTech.

== Early life ==
Viren Kapadia was born the youngest of four children to Hasu and Rasik Kapadia in Valsad Gujarat. He lived in Gujarat until he was 16 then his family moved to Connecticut in 1983.

== Education ==
Kapadia attended the University of Connecticut School of Business and graduated with a bachelor's degree in Accounting, 1989. He received his MBA in International Business at the University of New Haven, 1995. He was part of the Goldman Sachs 10,000 Small Businesses National Cohort program for Entrepreneurship/Entrepreneurial Studies in 2018 at Babson College.

== Career ==
After college, Kapadia worked as a Software Developer with Emery Worldwide in Wilton, Connecticut. In 1991, he worked at Aetna headquarters in Hartford, Connecticut as a Software Developer Manager. In 2001, Kapadia started working at GE, where various insurance business of GE were renamed Genworth Financial. While at Genworth Financial in 2003, Kapadia along with Bryon Tatsumi and Steven E. Tivey made a patent, filed June 25, 2003 and date of Patent June 9, 2009. In 2006, Kapadia worked for Hilb, Rogal & Hobbs Co. (now Willis Group) as chief information officer and Sourcing Officer. In 2009, Kapadia became the president and CEO of Gyrus System. His business was featured in the Wall Street Journal as one of Goldman Sachs 10,000 Small Businesses in November 2023.
