= Willis Tower =

Skyscraper in Chicago, Illinois

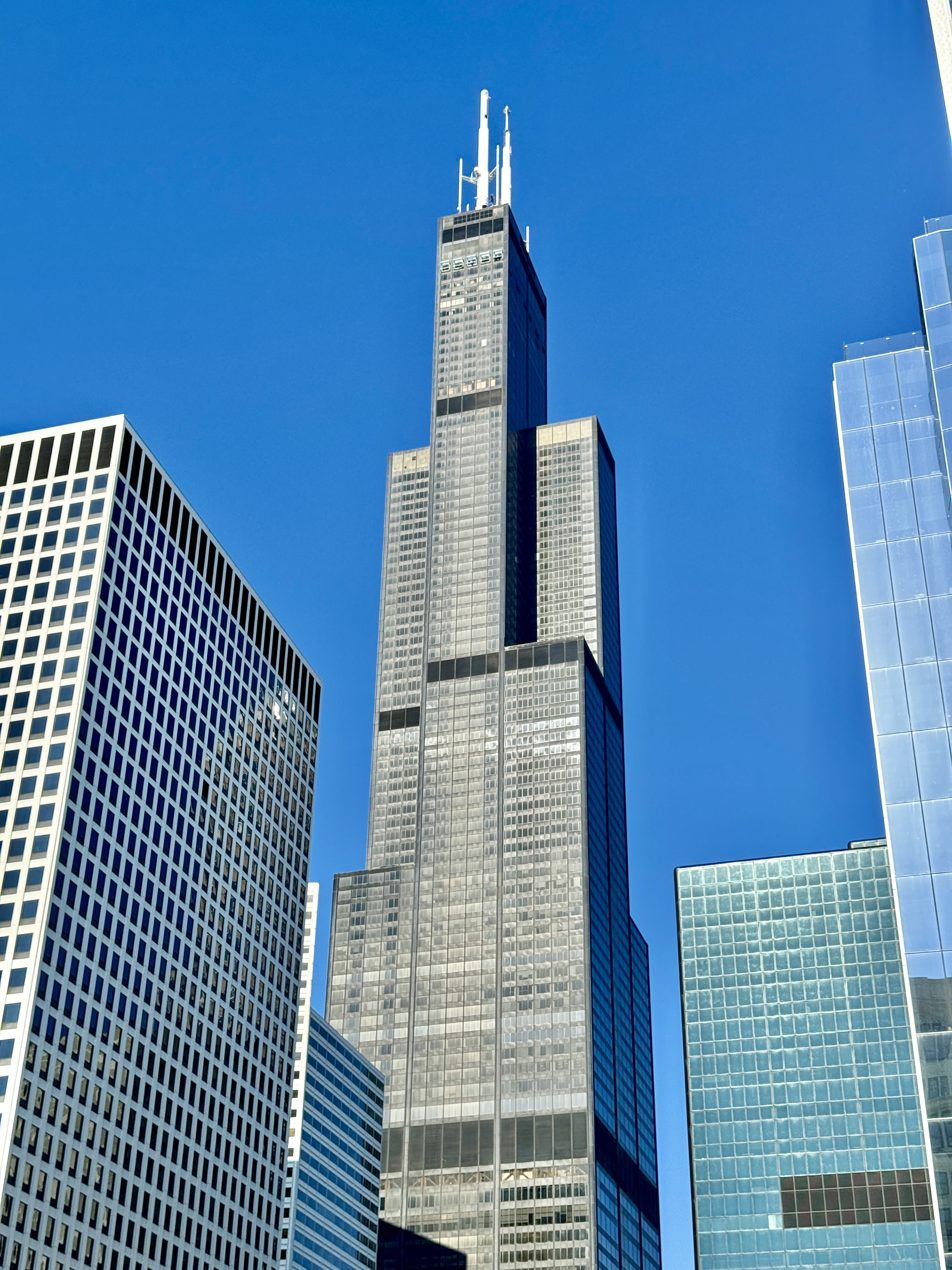
- The Willis Tower as seen from the west in 2024
- Former names: Sears Tower (1973–2009)

Record height
- Tallest in the world from 1973 to 1998/2004^{[I]}
- Preceded by: World Trade Center
- Surpassed by: Petronas Towers (Note: This record remains disputed. The Council on Vertical Urbanism (CVU) (then-previously Council on Tall Buildings and Urban Habitat / CTBUH) considers the Petronas Tower in the 1998 ruling, to be taller than the Willis Towers solely by spire / architectural height, while the Willis Tower does not fall under this metric as their antennas are not permanently fixed to the building, but still possess the highest roof height and usable occupied floor than the Petronas.); Taipei 101

General information
- Status: Completed
- Type: Office, observation, communication
- Architectural style: International
- Location: 233 S. Wacker Drive; Chicago, Illinois 60606; United States
- Coordinates: 41°52′44″N 87°38′09″W
- Current tenants: United Airlines; ArentFox Schiff; Seyfarth Shaw; Morgan Stanley; Willis Towers Watson
- Named for: Willis Towers Watson; Sears (1973–2009)
- Construction started: 1970; 56 years ago
- Completed: 1974; 52 years ago
- Opening: September 1973; 53 years ago
- Cost: US$150 million
- Owner: Blackstone Group

Height
- Architectural: 1,451 ft (442 m)
- Tip: 1,707 ft (520.3 m) after antennas added in 1982, 1,729 ft (527.0 m) after antenna extension in 2000
- Top floor: 1,354 ft (413 m)

Technical details
- Floor count: 110 (+3 basement floors)
- Floor area: 4,477,800 sq ft (416,000 m^{2})
- Lifts/elevators: 104, with 16 double-decker elevators, made by Westinghouse, modernized by Schindler Group and recently modernized by Otis Elevator Company

Design and construction
- Architects: Skidmore, Owings & Merrill; Fazlur Rahman Khan; Bruce Graham
- Engineer: Jaros, Baum & Bolles (MEP), Aon Fire Protection Engineering, formerly Schirmer Engineering Corporation (Fire)
- Structural engineer: Skidmore, Owings & Merrill
- Main contractor: Morse Diesel International

Other information
- Public transit: Brown Pink Orange Purple at Quincy

Website
- willistower.com

References
- I. "Willis Tower". Emporis. Archived from the original on September 23, 2015.

The Willis Tower, formerly known and still commonly referred to as the Sears Tower, is a 110-story, 1,451-foot (442.3 m) skyscraper in the Loop of Chicago, Illinois, United States. Designed by architect Bruce Graham and engineer Fazlur Rahman Khan of Skidmore, Owings & Merrill (SOM), it opened in 1973 as the world's tallest building, a title that it held for nearly 25 years. It currently remains the tallest building in Chicago, the third-tallest building in the Western Hemisphere, as well as the 26th-tallest in the world. Each year, more than 1.7 million people visit the Skydeck, the highest observation deck in the United States, making it one of Chicago's most popular tourist destinations. Due to its height and location, the tower is visible from a great distance. The building has appeared in numerous films and television shows set in Chicago.

The building occupies a site bound by Franklin Street, Jackson Boulevard, Wacker Drive, and Adams Street. Graham and Khan designed the building as nine square "tubes", clustered in a 3×3 matrix; seven of the tubes set back at upper floors. The tower has 108 stories as counted by standard methods, though the building's owners count the main roof as 109 and the mechanical penthouse roof as 110. The facade is made of anodized aluminum and black glass. The base of the building contains a retail complex known as the Catalog. The lower half of the tower was originally occupied by retail company Sears, which had its headquarters there until 1994, while the upper stories were rented out.

The structure was known as the Sears Tower from its construction until the naming rights were included in a 2009 lease with the Willis Group. Local area residents still refer to the building by its old name.

As of April 2019, the building's largest tenant is United Airlines, occupying 850,000 square feet (79,000 m^{2}) of space across 16 floors. Other major tenants include ArentFox Schiff, Seyfarth Shaw, Morgan Stanley, and the building's namesake, Willis Towers Watson.

== History ==
=== Planning ===
==== Site selection ====
Sears, Roebuck & Co. had occupied an office complex on Chicago's west side since 1906. The existing offices were inadequate by 1966, prompting Sears executives to begin searching for a new site. By 1969, Sears was the largest retailer in the world, with about 350,000 employees. Sears executives quickly determined that a new headquarters complex in the suburbs was infeasible, since it would require relocating about 7,000 employees. Instead, Sears executives decided to consolidate the thousands of employees in offices distributed throughout the Chicago area into one building on the western edge of Chicago's Loop.

Sears asked its outside counsel, Arnstein, Gluck, Weitzenfeld & Minow (now known as Saul Ewing LLP) to suggest a location. The firm consulted with local and federal authorities and the applicable law, then offered Sears two options. The first option was the Goose Island area northwest of the Loop, but Sears's vice president of real estate, Matthew J. Stacom, rejected this proposal. The other was a two-block area in the Loop, bounded by Franklin Street on the east, Jackson Boulevard on the south, Wacker Drive on the west, and Adams Street on the north. Though the site was more centrally located, it was also relatively small, with about 55,000 square feet (5,100 m^{2}). Bernard Feinberg, Albert I. Rubenstein, and Philip Teinowitz had assembled that site over the previous five years, but they had failed to acquire a neighboring 74,000-square-foot (6,900 m^{2}) lot from bus company Greyhound Lines.

Feinberg, Rubenstein, and Teinowitz then bought options for three adjacent lots. Under the terms of each option, unless the three men were able to acquire at least one of the lots within 90 days, all three options would be forfeited. Ultimately, Sears acquired the Loop site in 1970. Sears then obtained permits to close down one block of Quincy Street, which bisected the site from east to west. Attorneys from the Arnstein firm, headed by Andrew Adsit, began buying the properties parcel by parcel. Sears purchased 15 buildings from 100 owners and paid the government of Chicago $2.7 million (equivalent to $22.4 million in 2025) for the block of Quincy Street that was to be closed down.

==== Design process ====
Sears executives estimated that their new building would need about 4.2 million square feet (390,000 m^{2}), split into 70 stories with 60,000 square feet (5,600 m^{2}) each or 60 stories with 70,000 square feet (6,500 m^{2}) each. Sears commissioned architecture firm Skidmore, Owings & Merrill (SOM) to design the tower. SOM was also the lead structural engineer, and Jaros, Baum & Bolles provided MEP engineering.

Sears planned to move its merchandise group into the building initially, renting out the remaining space to other tenants until needed. Sears executives were accustomed to large floor areas of at least 100,000 square feet (9,300 m^{2}), but SOM architects raised concerns that the large floors would be unattractive to smaller tenants. A subsequent proposal called for two buildings connected by a footbridge, which would respectively contain 50,000 square feet (4,600 m^{2}) and 30,000 square feet (2,800 m^{2}) on each floor, but this was also infeasible.

Some floors were designed with smaller footprints to attract prospective lessees, so the building's height was increased to meet Sears's floor-area requirements. Architect Bruce Graham and structural engineer Fazlur Rahman Khan, both of whom were partners with SOM, proposed a tower with 55,000-square-foot (5,100 m^{2}) floors in the lower part of the building, as well as a series of setbacks with gradually tapering floor plates, giving the tower its distinctive look. During the design process, one of the architects reportedly pulled out nine cigarettes and staggered them vertically until the pair both agreed to the arrangement. This allowed Sears to occupy the large lower stories, while providing more conventional office space that could be rented out on the upper stories. The firm of Saphier, Lerner, Schindler was responsible for determining Sears's space requirements and designing furniture for the company. It conducted a year-long study to determine how 16 of the company's departments should be laid out within the building.

As Sears continued to offer optimistic growth projections, the height of the proposed tower also increased. Under Chicago's relatively lax zoning laws, the site could theoretically accommodate a 300-story building with 13.5 million square feet (1,250,000 m^{2}). In practice, most potential tenants did not want excessively high offices. Additionally, the Federal Aviation Administration (FAA) restricted the height of structures in the area to protect air traffic. FAA officials publicly denied that they had imposed a height limit; however, the area's minimum safe altitude would need to be raised by 1,000 feet (300 m) if the building was just 1 foot (0.30 m) taller. Plans for the tower were announced on July 27, 1970. The 1,450-foot-tall (440 m) building would contain 109 stories as measured from Wacker Drive and 110 stories as measured from Franklin Street. This would make Sears's new tower the tallest in the world, as measured by roof height, although New York City's under-construction World Trade Center Twin Towers would have a taller antenna. Although the Sears Tower would contain 4.4 million square feet (410,000 m^{2}) of space, only about 3.7 million square feet (340,000 m^{2}) would be used as offices.

=== Construction ===
==== Early construction ====
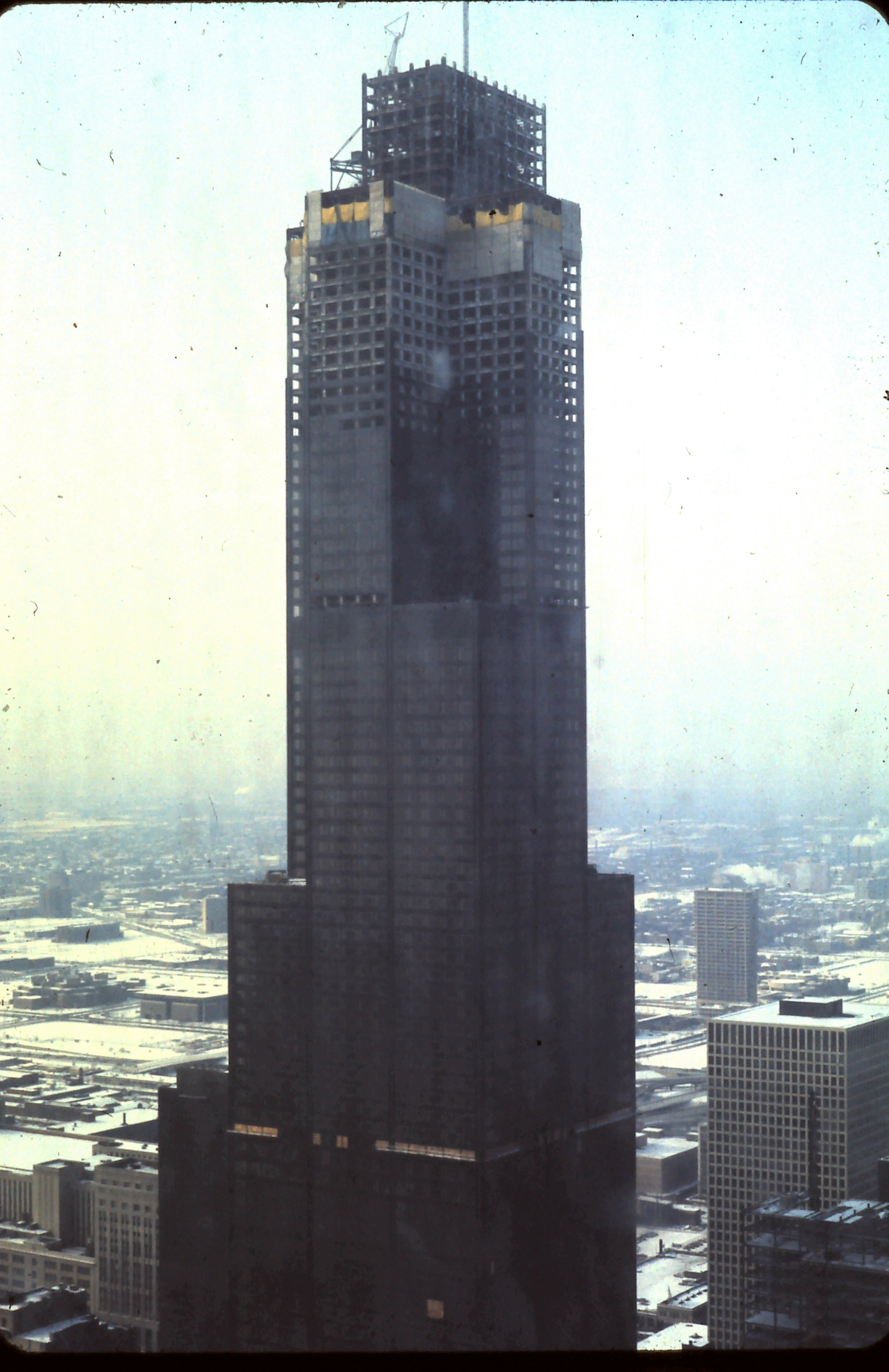
The Sears Tower (now the Willis Tower) during its construction in 1973

Work on the building's foundation commenced in August 1970. Contractors excavated the lot to a depth of 50 feet (15 m), and they removed 180,000 cubic feet (5,100 m^{3}) of dirt from the site. By that November, Spencer, White & Prentis Inc. was excavating a trench around the site, measuring 60 feet (18 m) deep and 20 by 216 feet (6.1 by 65.8 m) across. The contractors then built a slurry wall within the trench, made of concrete and reinforced steel. Workers used steel bracing to prevent the slurry wall from collapsing inward, then used caissons to drill 201 holes into the ground. They also rerouted a sewer that had run underneath Quincy Street, which was to be closed permanently as part of the tower's construction.

The Diesel Construction Company was hired as the Sears Tower's general contractor. Sears, Roebuck & Co. chairman Gordon M. Metcalf installed the building's first steel beam at a ceremony on June 7, 1971. The project employed 2,000 workers. To accelerate the building's construction, a concrete plant was built in the building's basement, allowing workers to pour one-third of a concrete floor every day. Contractors built two temporary kitchens on the site for workers, and telephone and loudspeaker systems were installed on every floor to allow workers to communicate. In addition, contractors installed temporary generators that could supply up to 14,000 kilowatts (19,000 hp) simultaneously; during the winter, most of this electricity was used to heat the exposed steel beams on the lowest five floors.

==== Broadcast-signal controversy ====
By late 1971, Chicagoland residents and broadcasters had raised concerns that the new Sears Tower would disrupt television broadcasts. According to one estimate, the building would obstruct television signals for 15 percent of Chicagoans and cause "double images" for another 20 percent, primarily affecting communities to the northwest and southeast. The same year, officials of the village of Skokie, northwest of Chicago, threatened to request an injunction to prevent further construction. In response to these concerns, Sears started researching methods to reduce the tower's effect on broadcast signals. Variety magazine stated that the Sears Tower did not interfere with broadcasts on its own, since several shorter towers in the Loop also interfered with broadcast signals. Nonetheless, the Illinois Citizens' Committee for Broadcasting filed a formal complaint with the Federal Communications Commission (FCC) in February 1972.

The first lawsuit against the building was filed by the state attorney in neighboring Lake County on March 17, 1972. A second suit was filed on March 28 in Cook County Circuit Court by the villages of Skokie, Northbrook, and Deerfield, Illinois. Sears filed motions to dismiss the Lake and Cook County lawsuits, which both sought to cap the building at 67 stories. Sears studied the possibility of erecting antennas atop its tower in April 1972, and the tower's construction continued, even as decisions on both lawsuits were delayed. At the end of the month, the company applied for permission to increase the building's height limit by 350 feet (110 m) and install a new antenna, although eight of Chicago's ten television stations criticized the plan. On May 17, 1972, Judge LaVerne Dickson, Chief of the Lake County Circuit Court, dismissed the suit, saying, "I find nothing that gives television viewers the right to reception without interference." By then, the building had reached the 58th story. The Lake County attorney appealed to the Illinois Supreme Court. In his decision on June 12, Judge Charles R. Barrett contended the plaintiffs did not have a right to undistorted television reception.

Meanwhile, the FCC declined to act on the height dispute on the grounds it did not have jurisdiction. The FAA approved the antennas atop the tower in June 1972, and the Illinois Supreme Court affirmed the previous rulings by Lake and Cook County circuit courts at the end of the month. Work was temporarily paused that July due to a labor strike. The next month, Sears formally announced plans for broadcast antennas on the tower's roof, and the company offered to spend $5 million (equivalent to $38.5 million in 2025) to help relocate broadcast stations to the Sears Tower. The United States Court of Appeals for the Seventh Circuit upheld the FCC's decision in September, and the United States Supreme Court refused to hear an appeal of the Seventh Circuit's decision that November.

==== Topping-out and completion ====
In November 1972, the Sears Tower became Chicago's tallest building, surpassing the Standard Oil Building, which had held the record for one month. At the time, the Sears project employed 1,600 workers in three shifts; one worker had been killed during the project so far. The building's final completion had been delayed significantly due to labor strikes and bad weather. The concrete work had reached the 77th floor, while the steel superstructure had reached the 84th floor; the remainder of the steelwork would be difficult to construct because of high winds at higher altitudes. Local television stations WTTW and WLS-TV were planning to install temporary broadcast antennas atop the tower when the steel frame was completed. The tower's superstructure had reached the 100th floor in February 1973, at which point it was taller than the Empire State Building in New York City.

The building was topped out on May 3, 1973. The day before the event, the Chicago Tribune's editorial board wrote: "Move aside, New York. After tomorrow, when schoolchildren dream of big buildings, they'll no longer think of you and the Empire State Building and the World Trade Center." The frame was still not technically complete, as three to four stories remained to be built. One week after the ceremony, four workers died after an elevator shaft caught fire. A fifth worker died after falling from the tower in an unrelated incident four days later. Work was halted again that June due to a labor strike, and Sears began moving furniture into the building that month. The construction cost was about US$150 million, (equivalent to $1.09 billion in 2025). Despite the size of the project, Sears executives said the building could not accommodate Sears' annual shareholder meetings, and the company continued to rent space in other structures.

=== 20th century ===
==== Opening and early years ====
The first Sears employees began moving into the tower during the weekend of September 9, 1973. Flashing beacons on the building's roof, the first to be installed at any building in Chicago, were activated the same month. Upon the tower's opening, broadcasters at the John Hancock Center, Chicago's second-tallest building, had to decide whether to relocate to the Sears Tower. Two television stations decided to relocate. Six other stations remained at the John Hancock Center, citing a study which showed that relocating to the Sears Tower would provide only minimal benefits. Documents released in late 1973 indicated that the Sears Tower would cause much more interference than either Sears or the television stations had disclosed. WLS-TV moved to the Sears Tower in February 1974, followed by WTTW the next month.

By March 1974, three-fourths of the space in the building was occupied; Sears had leased the upper stories to tenants such as Goldman Sachs, Northwest Industries, and Schiff Hardin. A mobile sculpture by Alexander Calder was dedicated in the lobby in October 1974. Sears' optimistic growth projections were not realized; instead, in late 1974, the company fired 500 workers, about seven percent of the 7,000 Sears employees that worked in the tower. Competition beyond its traditional rivals such as Montgomery Ward arose from emerging retail giants including Kmart, Kohl's, and Walmart. As a result of a surplus of office space that emerged in the 1980s, the tower did not draw as many tenants as projected and so stood half-vacant for a decade.

==== Renovation and relocation ====
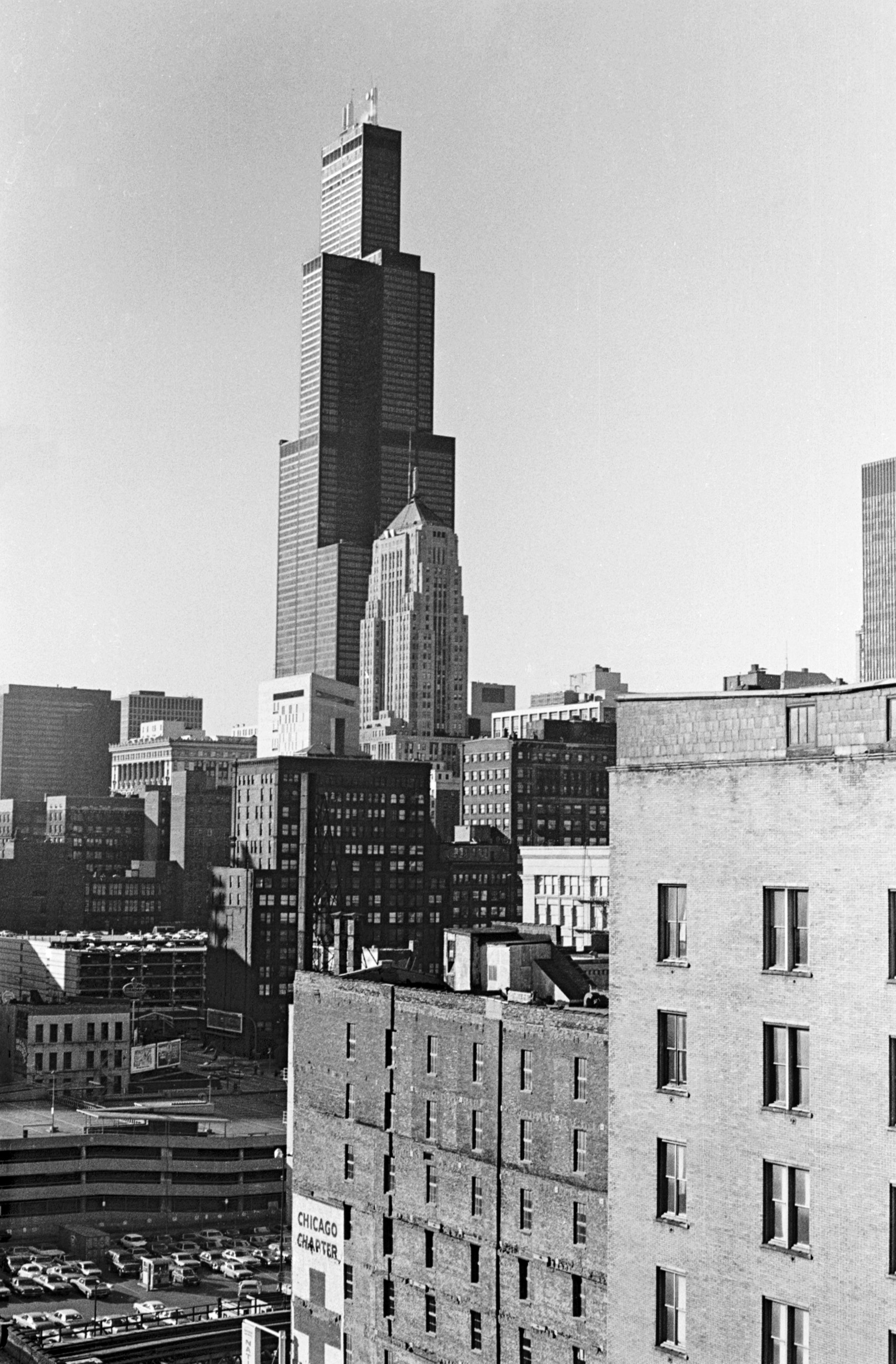
The tower in 1978, after its completion

In February 1984, Sears announced that it would renovate the building to attract visitors to the lower floors. At the time, 6,500 Sears employees occupied more than half of the building, taking up the lowest 48 stories. The remainder of the tower was occupied by 5,500 employees from about 70 companies. As part of the project, the main entrance was covered with a four-story glass dome, and the first four stories were converted into a shopping atrium. In addition, a visitor center for the building's Skydeck was constructed. The renovations, designed by SOM, were completed in mid-1985. Paul Gapp of the Chicago Tribune wrote that SOM had "scaled the new entrance skillfully, in keeping with the main building's height" and that the new atrium "relieves the formerly cramped feeling from just inside the Franklin entrance".

Sears announced in 1988 that it would sell the tower and relocate its merchandising division from the lower half of the building. The company wanted to earn at least $1 billion from the sale of the Sears Tower, so it offered multiple concessions to potential buyers, including a guarantee that Sears would continue to pay rent on the lower half of the building until tenants were found for these stories. Four large firms were negotiating to buy the tower by July 1989. The company had difficulties finding a buyer, in part because the lower stories were too large for many potential tenants. Sears nearly sold the tower to Canadian company Olympia & York, but the deal was canceled in September 1989 because the two firms could not agree on who would pay the property taxes. In November 1989, Sears decided to instead refinance the building. The next year, Sears took out a mortgage loan on the tower for $850 million from MetLife and AEW Capital Management, with MetLife as the holder of the mortgage note; the loan would mature in 2005.

In 1990, the law firm of Keck, Mahin & Cate decided to move into a development that would become 77 West Wacker Drive, rebuffing Sears' attempts to entice the firm to stay. Just two years later, Sears began moving its own offices out of the building to a new campus in Hoffman Estates, Illinois, which was completed in 1995. As the maturation of the mortgage approached, Sears renegotiated the loan in 1994. The negotiations resulted in an agreement where Sears would no longer be liable for the $850 million loan, although it would only nominally own the building, while AEW and MetLife effectively had total control. As part of the 1994 agreement, AEW and MetLife would be able to take official ownership of the building in 2003. In 1997, Toronto-based TrizecHahn, at the time the lessee of the CN Tower, acquired AEW's holdings in the building for $110 million, assuming $4 million in liabilities and a $734 million mortgage.

=== 21st century ===
Trizec had projected that the Sears Tower would quickly reach a value of $1 billion. These projections were not met, with the tower facing the same vacancy and other problems it saw under Sears, although Trizec made somewhat successful efforts to attract new tenants. Following the September 11 attacks, two of the largest tenants, Goldman Sachs and Merrill Lynch, immediately announced plans for vacating 300,000 ft^{2} of space. In 2003, Trizec sold its holdings of the tower to MetLife for $9 million.

==== Syndicate ownership ====
In March 2004, MetLife announced that it would sell the building to a group of investors, including Joseph Chetrit, Joseph Moinian, Lloyd Goldman, Joseph Cayre, and Jeffrey Feil of New York, as well as American Landmark Properties of Skokie, Illinois. The quoted price was $840 million, with $825 million held in a mortgage. Two years later, in February 2007, the Sears Tower's owners obtained a $780 million loan from UBS. At the time, UBS valued the tower at $1.2 billion.

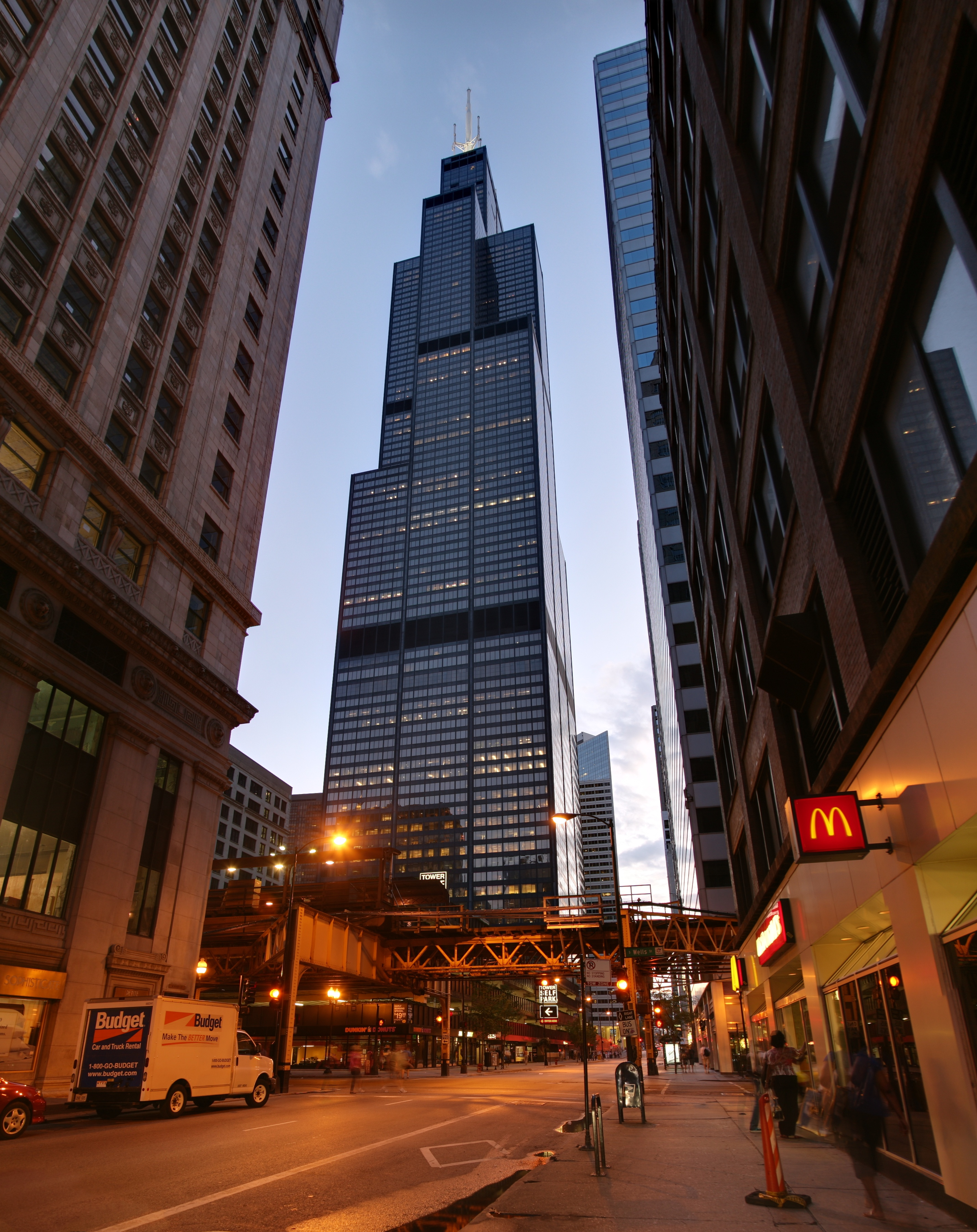
The tower at night in 2009

Since 2007, the owners had considered plans for the construction of a hotel on the north side of Jackson Boulevard, between Wacker Drive and Franklin Street, close to the entrance of the observation deck, above the tower's underground parking garage. According to the tower's owners, the second building was considered in the original design. The plan was eventually cancelled as city zoning did not permit construction of such a tall building in that location. In February 2009, the owners announced they were considering a plan to paint the structure silver, an idea that was later abandoned. It was hoped that a new, silver, paint-job would "rebrand" the building and highlight its advances in energy efficiency for an estimated cost of $50 million.

Although Sears' naming rights expired in 2003, the building continued to be called the Sears Tower for several years, despite multiple changes in ownership. In March 2009, London-based insurance broker Willis Group Holdings agreed to lease a portion of the building and obtained the naming rights. On July 16, 2009, the building was officially renamed the Willis Tower. By 2011, the building's owners were considering selling a partial ownership stake, or even the entire building, to an investor. The next year, United Airlines announced it would move its corporate headquarters from 77 West Wacker Drive to the Willis Tower.

==== Blackstone ownership ====
By March 2015, the Willis Tower was being marketed at a price of $1.5 billion. The same month, the Blackstone Group purchased the tower for a reported $1.3 billion, the highest price ever paid for a property in the U.S. outside of New York City. Blackstone announced a $500 million renovation in January 2017, which would include the construction of the Catalog, a six-story commercial complex, replacing a plaza on Jackson Boulevard and the entrance on Wacker Drive. Architectural firm Gensler designed the renovation. A rooftop terrace was built atop the Catalog, and the building's HVAC systems were overhauled. Most of the building's elevators, excluding those that served the Skydeck, were also renovated for the first time in the tower's history. The new elevators would be faster than the original elevators and would use 35 percent less energy. The building's owners installed artwork by Olafur Eliasson, Jacob Hashimoto, and other artists.

To fund these improvements, in February 2017, Blackstone obtained a $1 billion loan from a group of banks including Goldman Sachs. The new loan replaced $750 million of CMBS debt that was maturing. The following year, because of the increasing costs of the renovation, Blackstone received a new $1.3 billion loan from Deutsche Bank and Barclays. The Wacker Drive "Lunchbox" entrance was demolished in early 2018 to make way for the Catalog. A steel globe next to the entrance, manufactured by the Poblocki Sign Company and installed in 2010, was relocated to Elmhurst, Illinois. A 40,000-square-foot (3,700 m^{2}) private club on the 66th and 67th stories opened in June 2018. The club included a restaurant named Craftsman and a lounge named Frame, both of which exclusively served the tower's tenants, as well as a public restaurant known as the East Room. That September, Urbanspace announced that it would operate a food hall on the lower stories.

In 2020, insurance company Aon had proposed acquiring Willis Towers Watson (which had succeeded the Willis Group as the building's owner), prompting speculation that the building could be renamed again. The planned merger was canceled in 2021 following an antitrust lawsuit from the United States Department of Justice. The building's renovation was completed in May 2022. At the time, although the Willis Tower was nearly 85 percent leased, the number of tenants and visitors entering the building had decreased significantly since 2019, in part because of the COVID-19 pandemic in Chicago. By April 2023, Blackstone had written down the value of its investment in the tower by $119 million. Blackstone was considering selling the Willis Tower by early 2026.

=== Incidents ===
In June 2006, seven men were arrested by the FBI and charged with plotting to destroy the tower. Deputy FBI Director John Pistole described their plot as "more aspirational than operational". The case went to court in October 2007. After three trials, five of the suspects were convicted and two acquitted. The alleged leader of the group, Narseal Batiste, was sentenced to 13 1/2 years in prison. In response to the perceived threat of an attack, the building's largest tenant at this time, Ernst & Young, moved to North Wacker Drive in early 2009.

In May 2020, heavy rains caused three of the basement levels to flood, knocking out power to the building. This also resulted in many TV and radio stations going off the air.

== Architecture ==
Breakdown of the bundled tube structure of Willis Tower with simplified floor plans

The Willis Tower was designed by architect Bruce Graham and structural engineer Fazlur Rahman Khan of Skidmore, Owings and Merrill. Graham and Khan designed the building as nine square "tubes", clustered in a 3×3 matrix forming a square base with 225-foot (69 m) sides. The building's rentable area is 3,810,000 ft^{2} (354,000 m^{2}). The structure was intended to accommodate 16,500 employees.

=== Form and facade ===
Each of the "tubes" is a column-free module measuring 75 by 75 feet (23 by 23 m), which set back at different stories. There are setbacks at the 50th, 66th, and 90th floors. The lowest 50 stories contain nine tubes and cover 52,000 square feet (4,800 m^{2}) each. The northwest and southeast tubes terminate at the 50th floor. The 51st through 66th floors each span 41,420 square feet (3,848 m^{2}), above which the northeast and southwest tubes end. From the 67th to 90th floors, each story is shaped like a cross, covering 30,170 square feet (2,803 m^{2}). The north, east, and south tubes end at the 90th floor; the remaining west and center tubes reach 108 floors, with an area of 12,283 square feet (1,141.1 m^{2}) on each of the top stories.

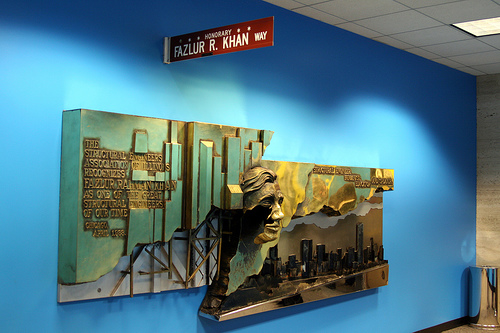
Sculpture honoring Fazlur Rahman Khan, considered the father of tubular designs, at the Willis Tower. Khan is known for making important advancements in skyscraper engineering.

The Sears Tower was the first building to use this innovative design. It was both structurally efficient and economic: at 1,450 feet, it provided more space and rose higher than the Empire State Building and cost much less per unit area. The system would prove highly influential in skyscraper construction and has been used in most supertall buildings since, including the world's current tallest building, the Burj Khalifa. In February 1982, two television antennas were added to the structure, increasing its total height to 1,707 feet (520.3 m). The western antenna was later extended, bringing the overall height to 1,729 feet (527.0 m) on June 5, 2000, to improve reception of local NBC station WMAQ-TV.

The perimeter of the Willis Tower contains columns that are spaced 15 feet (4.6 m) apart on their centers. The facade is made of anodized aluminum and black glass. Alcoa manufactured 4 million pounds (1.8 kt) of aluminum sheeting for the building's facade. Black bands appear on the tower around the 29th–32nd, 64th–65th, 88th–89th, and 104th–108th floors. These elements are louvers to ventilate the building's environmental support systems and obscure its belted trusses. The rest of the facade is made of 16,000 rectangular windows. all of which measure 5 by 8 feet (1.5 by 2.4 m) and are tinted with bronze.

Outside the building, there was originally a 80,000-square-foot (7,400 m^{2}) plaza made of pink granite. In the late 2010s, a three-level wing was built along the western and southern sides of the tower replacing the plaza. The roof garden above the annex spans 30,000 square feet (2,800 m^{2}). The annex contains a facade of black steel and aluminum, similar to in the original building. The Jackson Boulevard facade of the annex contains an artwork by Olafur Eliasson, entitled Atmospheric wave wall. The work, measuring 30 by 60 feet (9.1 by 18.3 m) across, comprises almost 2,000 blue-and-green steel tiles, which are decorated with hexagonal motifs. The wall is backlit at night.

=== Structural and mechanical features ===
The interior includes 74,000 short tons (66,000 long tons; 67,000 t) of steel, 4 million pounds (1.8 kt) of aluminum, and 101 acres (4,400,000 ft^{2}; 410,000 m^{2}) of concrete flooring. The building contains diagonal columns only on the two stories immediately below each of the setbacks, thus reducing shear stress. The interior of the building could not contain diagonal beams, since these would have obstructed the connections between each of the "tubes". Therefore, the columns and the horizontal beams on each story are connected by rigid joints. The superstructure was designed to withstand wind gusts of 130 miles per hour (210 km/h), which on average would occur once every hundred years. According to the Chicago Tribune, the top of the building would be able to bend by as much as 7 inches (180 mm), returning to its normal position within 7.2 seconds.

The Willis Tower's basement extends 50 feet (15 m) deep, resting on a 5-foot-thick (1.5 m) concrete slab. The ground directly beneath the building was largely made of clay; the underlying layer of limestone was as much as 100 feet (30 m) beneath ground level. As a result, the foundation was excavated using 201 caissons, of which 114 reached the underlying limestone. The caissons created holes that measured up to 10 feet (3.0 m) across. Some holes at the northwestern and northeastern corners of the site filled up with groundwater and had to be drained. Workers next placed steel tubes into the holes, then poured concrete around the tubes.

During the Sears Tower's construction, SOM and Chicago government officials considered adding "smoke free and fire free" areas to the building, as well as a complete sprinkler system serving all floors. Neither of these features had previously been used in a structure in Chicago. Even though regulations did not require a fire sprinkler system, the building was equipped with one from the beginning. There are around 40,000 sprinkler heads in the building, installed at a cost of $4 million. When it was completed, the Sears Tower was heated electrically, unlike older structures that used gas heating. It included 145,000 light fixtures and a cooling system capable of 17,000 tons of refrigeration. Furthermore, the tower contained fire-suppression and communications systems for emergency use, which were powered by diesel generators. If there was a fire in one section of the building, the building's smoke-detection system would close off the fresh-air intake openings in that section, discharging smoke outdoors.

Fifteen above-ground stories, as well as three of the basement levels, contain mechanical equipment. Above the Skydeck on the 103rd floor is a seven-story mechanical penthouse.

==== Elevators and escalators ====
The Sears Tower was planned with 103 elevators, including 14 double-deck elevators. The office stories are served by 97 elevator cabs; due to the presence of the double-deck elevators, these occupy 83 shafts. As designed, one bank of single-deck elevators connected the lobby to the lowest 28 stories. Banks of double-deck elevators traveled to "sky lobbies" at the 33rd/34th and 66th/67th floors, where passengers could transfer to local elevators. The 34th through 103rd stories were served by local elevators that operated from the sky lobbies. Two elevators also ran directly from the lobby to the Skydeck on the 103rd floor. As of 2018, the elevators carried 5.8 million passengers per year.

Six of the elevators are used for freight. One of the freight elevators served all stories, traveling to a height of 1,440 feet (440 m). During a fire or another emergency, this elevator would be reserved for the Chicago Fire Department. Other elevators would be controlled from the 33rd floor. During a fire, elevators would be dispatched to the affected floors to assist with evacuation.

The building also had 16 escalators, including a set of double-height escalators that traveled from the main lobby to the lower mezzanine. Another set of escalators connects the 33rd and 34th stories.

=== Interior ===
==== Base ====
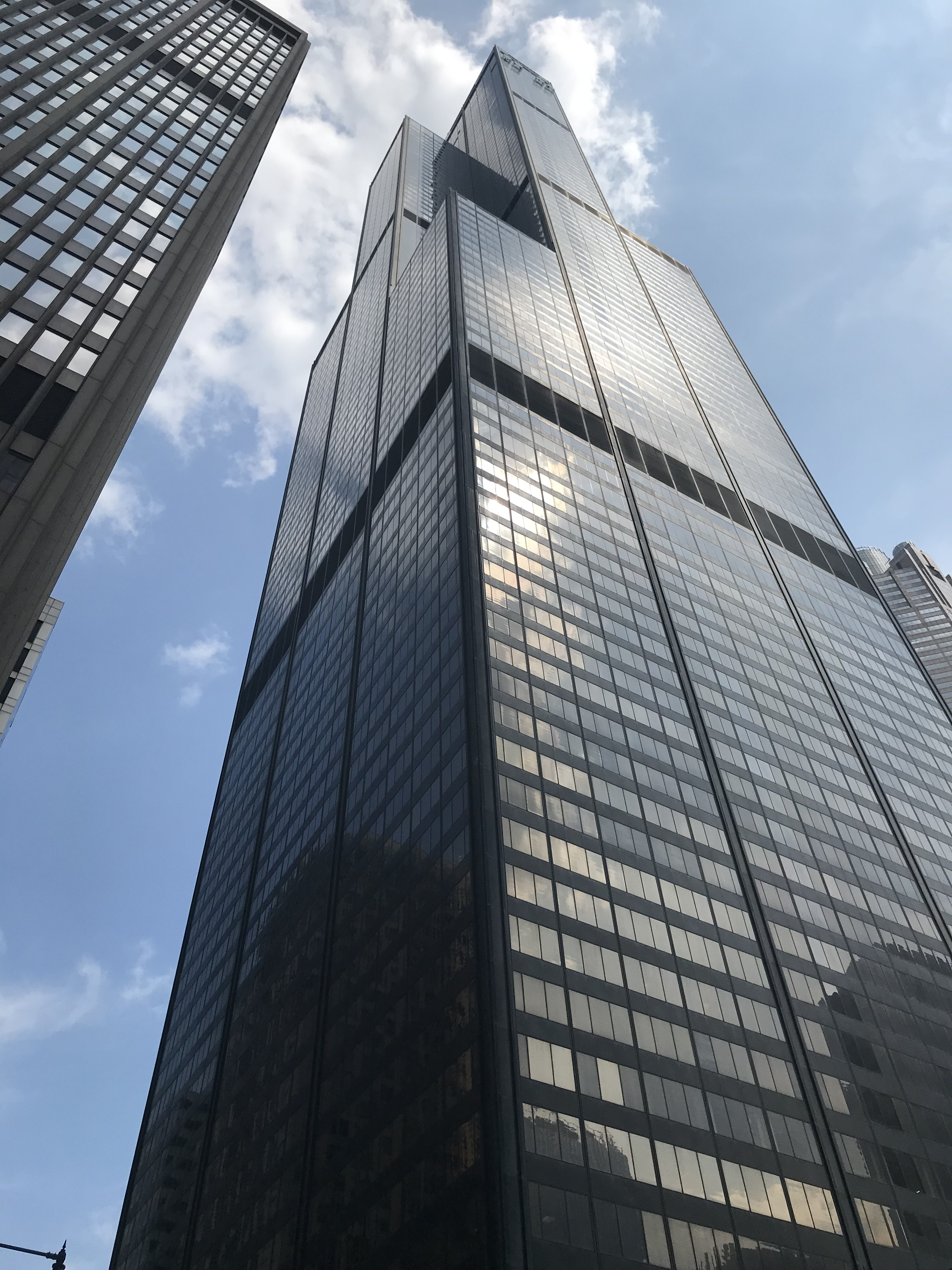
Bottom of the tower

When the building was completed, the main entrance was on Wacker Drive to the west. There was a plaza on the south side of the building, sloping upward toward Franklin Street to the east. The Franklin Street side of the building was 6 feet (1.8 m) lower than the Wacker Drive entrance, so the entrances on Franklin Street were actually below the plaza, leading to the building's lower mezzanine. Below ground level are three basement levels with a total area of 400,000 square feet (37,000 m^{2}). The basements included a 1,200-seat cafeteria, commercial space, service areas, and a loading dock for 17 trucks. The basement also contained a 150-spot parking garage.

As of 2022, the building's base covers 463,000 square feet (43,000 m^{2}) and contains two lobbies for tenants. The building's tenants primarily enter from Wacker Drive and Franklin Street. Shoppers, restaurant patrons, and visitors to the Skydeck observation deck use the southern entrance on Jackson Boulevard. The Wacker Drive lobby contains In the Heart of this Infinite Particle of Galactic Dust, a 2019 artwork by Jacob Hashimoto. It consists of over 7,000 rice-paper and resin disks that are hung from the ceiling. To honor Khan's contributions to skyscraper engineering design, the Structural Engineers Association of Illinois also commissioned a sculpture of him for the lobby of the Willis Tower.

The commercial complex at the building's lowest stories is known as the Catalog, a reference to Sears' mail-order catalogs. The six-story complex includes numerous restaurants. It extends into three of the building's basement levels, as well as the three-story annex to the south and west of the tower. The roof of the annex includes a curved skylight with 240 glass panes, and the northern section of the annex's roof is supported by black columns that resemble those in the original tower. The Catalog also contains decorative details, such as handrails and staircase landings, which are inspired by elements of Chicago's "built environment". The third story of the Catalog contains a 30,000-square-foot coworking space operated by Convene.

=== Skydeck ===
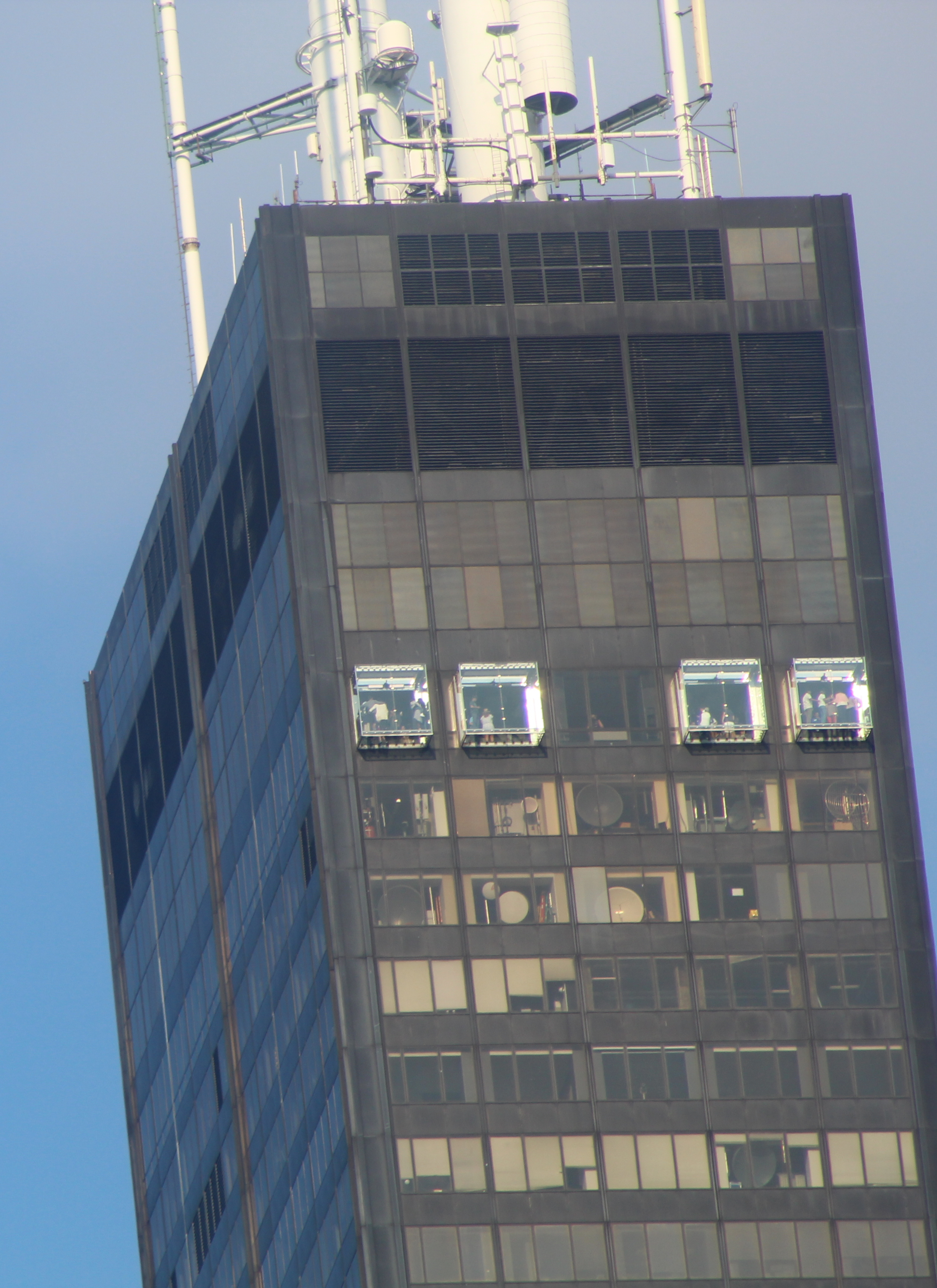
Four glass-bottom skyboxes on the west facade of the Willis Tower at the 103rd floor

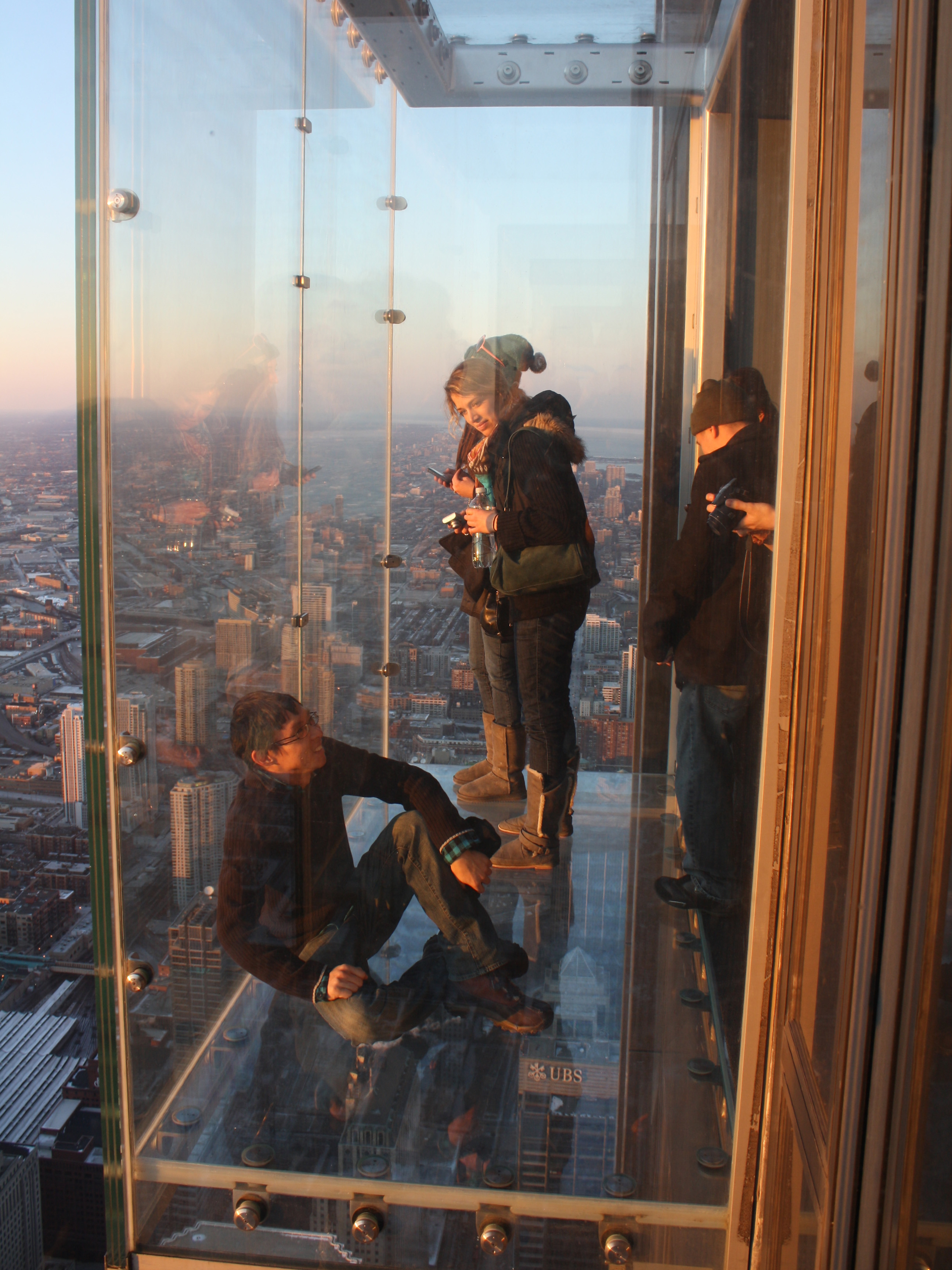
Glass balcony at the Skydeck

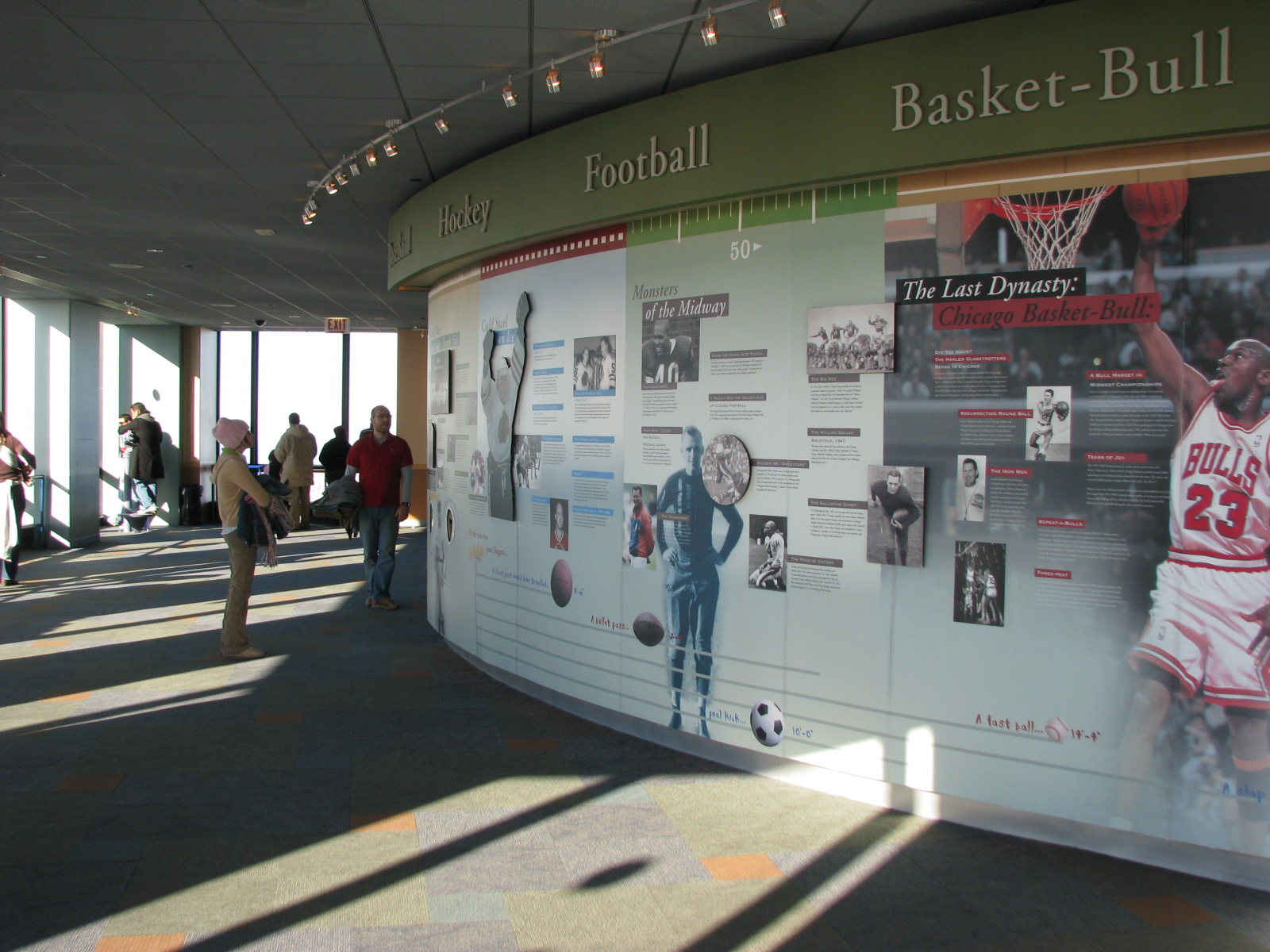
A photo from the Skydeck in the year 2008, showcasing the murals added in the 2000 renovations

The Willis Tower observation deck, called the Skydeck, opened on June 22, 1974. Located on the 103rd floor, 1,353 feet (412.4 m) above ground level, it is the highest observation deck in the United States and one of Chicago's most famous tourist attractions. Tourists can experience how the building sways in wind and see far over the plains of Illinois and across Lake Michigan to Indiana, Michigan, and Wisconsin in clear conditions. Elevators reach the top in about 60 seconds, allowing occupants to feel the change in pressure as they ascend. Some 1.7 million tourists visit annually as of 2018. There is also an event venue on the 99th floor.

In April 2000, the Skydeck received a $4 million renovation, featuring multimedia exhibits with interactive effects and murals. Kiosks were scattered around the Skydeck, offering information in six languages. Dellmont Leisure Design, the primary firm involved in the renovation of the Top of the World observation deck at the World Trade Center, created the design.

In January 2009, a major renovation of the Skydeck began, including the installation of retractable glass balconies which extend approximately 4 feet (1.2 m) from the facade of the 103rd floor, overlooking South Wacker Drive. The all-glass boxes, informally dubbed "The Ledge", allow visitors to see the street below. The boxes, which can accommodate 5 short tons (4.5 metric tons), opened to the public on July 2, 2009. On May 29, 2014, the laminated glass flooring of one of the boxes cracked while visitors were inside, but there were no injuries. The flooring of the same box cracked again on June 12, 2019. In May 2022 a fifth glass ledge opened on the west facade overlooking South Wacker Drive.

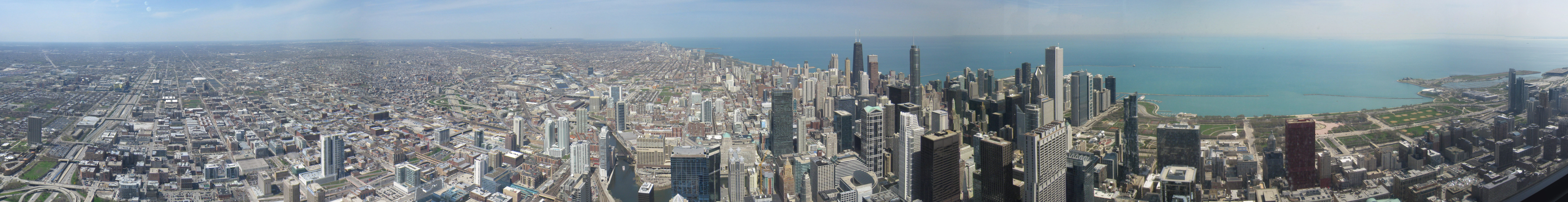
Panorama of Chicago skyline as seen from Willis Tower Skydeck

== Height ==
Height comparison with (left to right) Burj Khalifa, Dubai; CN Tower, Toronto; Willis Tower, Chicago

When completed, the Sears Tower was the world's tallest building but not the world's tallest structure. Toronto's CN Tower was about 350 feet (106.7 m) taller, although the Council on Tall Buildings and Urban Habitat (CTBUH) does not consider the CN Tower to be a building, since it does not have floors from the ground up. The Willis Tower remains the third tallest building in the Americas and in the Western Hemisphere (after One World Trade Center and Central Park Tower in New York City). With a pinnacle height of 1,729 feet (527.0 m), it is the third-tallest freestanding structure in the Americas. It is the 16th-tallest freestanding structure in the world by pinnacle height.

When the Petronas Twin Towers in Kuala Lumpur, Malaysia, was completed in 1998, it claimed to be the tallest building in the world, measuring 1,482.6 feet (451.9 m) tall including decorative spires. Chicagoans objected to this claim on the basis that the Sears Tower's top floor was higher than that of either of the Petronas Towers. In the ensuing controversy, four categories of "tallest building" were created. Of these, Petronas was the tallest in the category of height to the top of architectural elements, meaning spires but not antennas. Taipei 101 in Taiwan claimed the record in three of the four categories in 2004, surpassing the Petronas Twin Towers in spire height and the Sears Tower in roof height and highest occupied floor. People suggested that Sears add cosmetics atop its tower to surpass Taipei 101, but this did not materialize. On August 12, 2007, the Burj Khalifa in Dubai was reported by its developers to have surpassed the tower in all height categories. Upon completion, One World Trade Center in New York City surpassed the Willis Tower through its structural and pinnacle heights, but not by roof, observation deck elevation, or highest occupied floor.

Until 2000, the tower did not hold the record for being the tallest building by pinnacle height. From 1969 to 1978, this record was held by John Hancock Center, whose antenna reached a height of 1,500 feet (457.2 m), 49 feet (14.9 m) taller than the Sears Tower's original height. One World Trade Center became taller by pinnacle height with the addition of a 359-foot (109.4-meter) antenna, bringing its total height to 1,728 feet (526.7 m). In 1982, two antennas were installed which brought its total height to 1,707 feet (520.3 m), making it taller than the John Hancock Center but not One World Trade Center. However, the extension of the tower's western antenna in June 2000 to 1,729 feet (527.0 m) allowed it to just barely claim the title of tallest building by pinnacle height.

The lowest level of the Willis Tower is 43 feet (13 m) below the elevation of Franklin Street.

=== Climbing ===
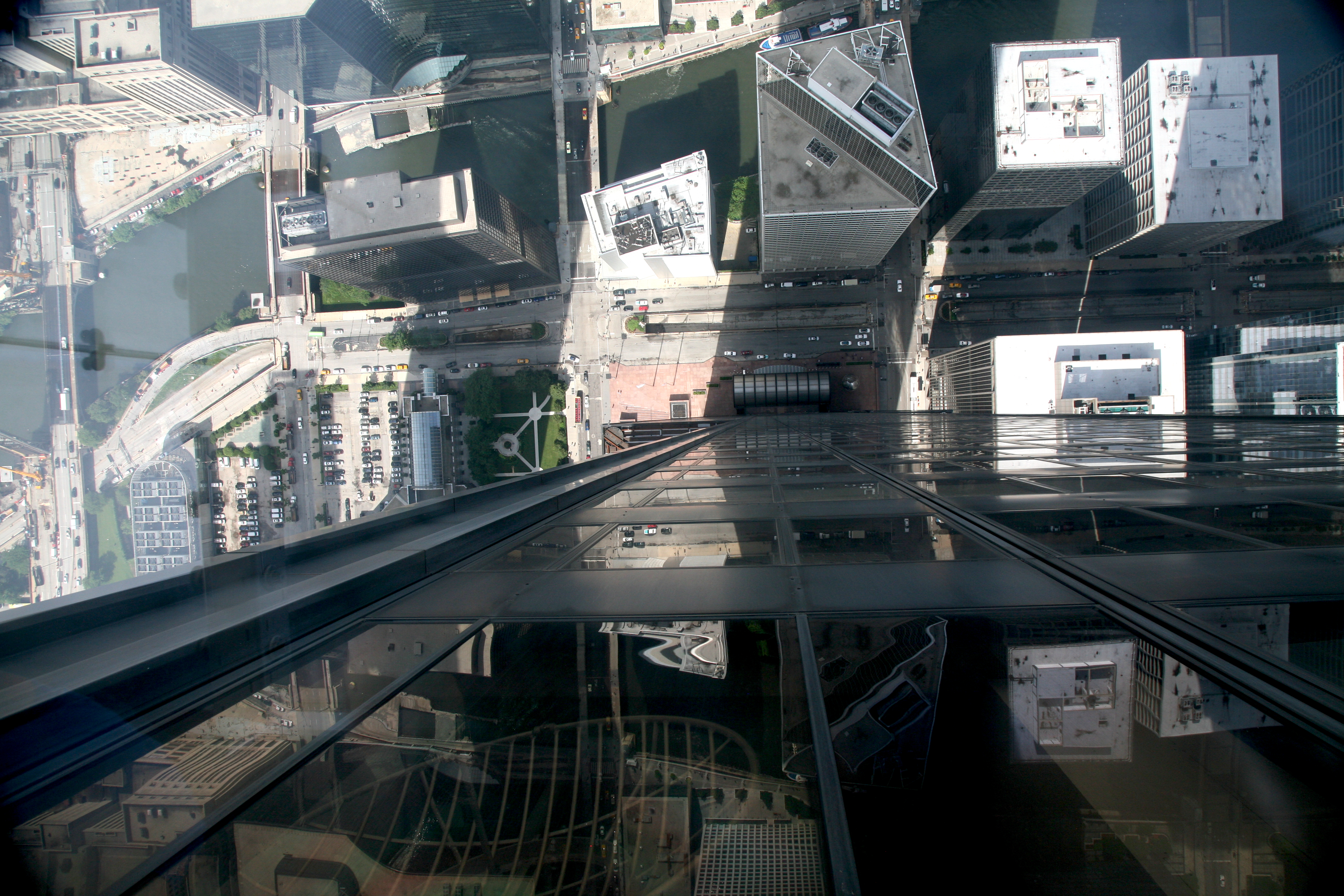
View of the wall of the tower from the Skydeck

On May 25, 1981, Dan Goodwin, wearing a homemade Spider-Man suit while using suction cups, camming devices, and sky hooks, and despite several attempts by the Chicago Fire Department to stop him, made the first successful outside ascent of the tower. Goodwin was arrested at the top after the seven-hour climb and was later charged with trespassing. Goodwin stated that the reason he made the climb was to call attention to shortcomings in high-rise rescue and firefighting techniques. After a lengthy interrogation by Chicago's District Attorney and Fire Commissioner, Goodwin was officially released from jail.

In August 1999, French urban climber Alain Robert, using only his bare hands and bare feet, scaled the building's exterior glass and steel wall all the way to the top. A thick fog settled in near the end of his climb, making the last 20 stories of the building's glass and steel exterior slippery.

Since 2009, the tower has hosted SkyRise Chicago, a race to the top of the tower's 103-story staircase, as a charity event benefiting Shirley Ryan AbilityLab.

== Naming rights ==
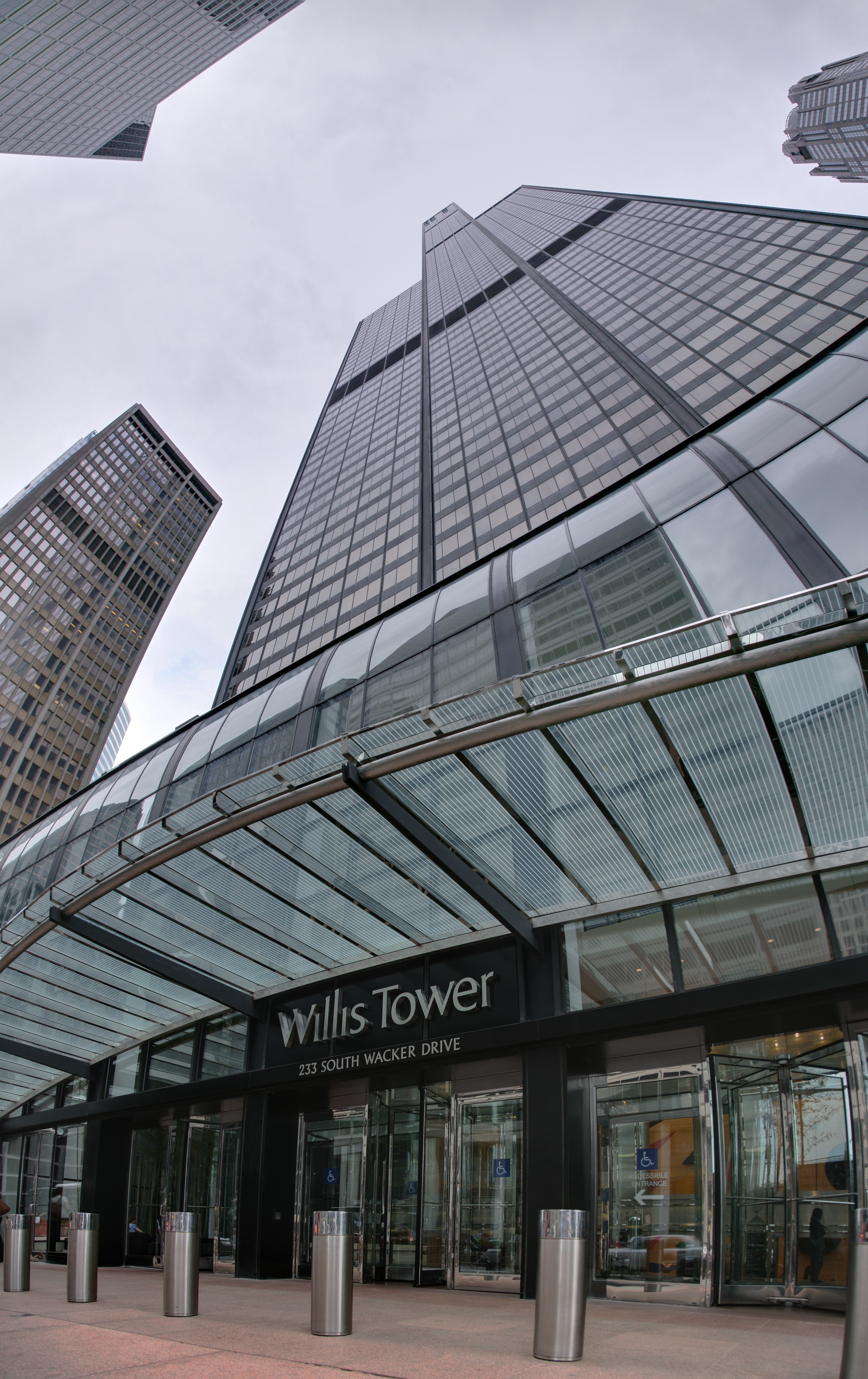
West facade and entrance in 2009, prior to renovation

Sears sold the tower in 1994 and vacated it by 1995, but retained naming rights through 2003. The new owners were rebuffed in renaming deals with CDW Corp in 2005 and the U.S. Olympic Committee in 2008. British insurance broker Willis Group Holdings leased more than 140,000 square feet (13,000 m^{2}) of space on three floors in 2009. A Willis spokesman said the naming rights were obtained as part of the negotiations at no cost to Willis and the building was renamed the Willis Tower on July 16, 2009. The naming rights were valid for 15 years.

The Chicago Tribune joked that the building's new name reminded them of the oft-repeated "What you talkin' 'bout, Willis?" catchphrase from the American television sitcom Diff'rent Strokes and considered the name-change ill-advised in "a city with a deep appreciation of tradition and a healthy ego, where some Chicagoans still mourn the switch from Marshall Field's to Macy's". This feeling was confirmed in a July 16, 2009, CNN article in which some Chicago-area residents expressed reluctance to accept the Willis Tower name, and in an article that appeared in the October 2010 issue of Chicago magazine that ranked the building among Chicago's 40 most important, the author pointedly refused to acknowledge the name change and referred to the building as the "Sears Tower". Time magazine called the name change one of the top 10 worst corporate name changes and pointed to negative press coverage by local news outlets and online petitions from angry residents. The naming rights issue continued into 2013, when Eric Zorn noted in the Chicago Tribune that "We're stubborn about such things. This month marked four years since the former Sears Tower was re-christened Willis Tower, and the new name has yet to stick."

== Floor plans ==
| Floor | Purpose |
|---|---|
| 110 | Penthouse Roof |
| 109 | Roof with Mechanical Penthouse |
| 104–108 | Mechanical and communications |
| 103 | Skydeck Observatory |
| 100–102 | Communications |
| 99 | Secondary Skydeck and Restaurant |
| 90–98 | Offices |
| 88–89 | Mechanical |
| 68–87 | Offices |
| 66–67 | Sky lobby, restaurants |
| 64–65 | Mechanical |
| 35–63 | Offices |
| 34 | Sky lobby, conference center |
| 33 | Sky lobby, restaurant, fitness center |
| 29–32 | Mechanical |
| 3–28 | Offices |
| 2 | Upper lobby, restaurants |
| 1 | Lobby, shops and restaurants |
| LL3–LL1 | Lower lobby, Skydeck lobby, shops and restaurants |

== Broadcasting ==
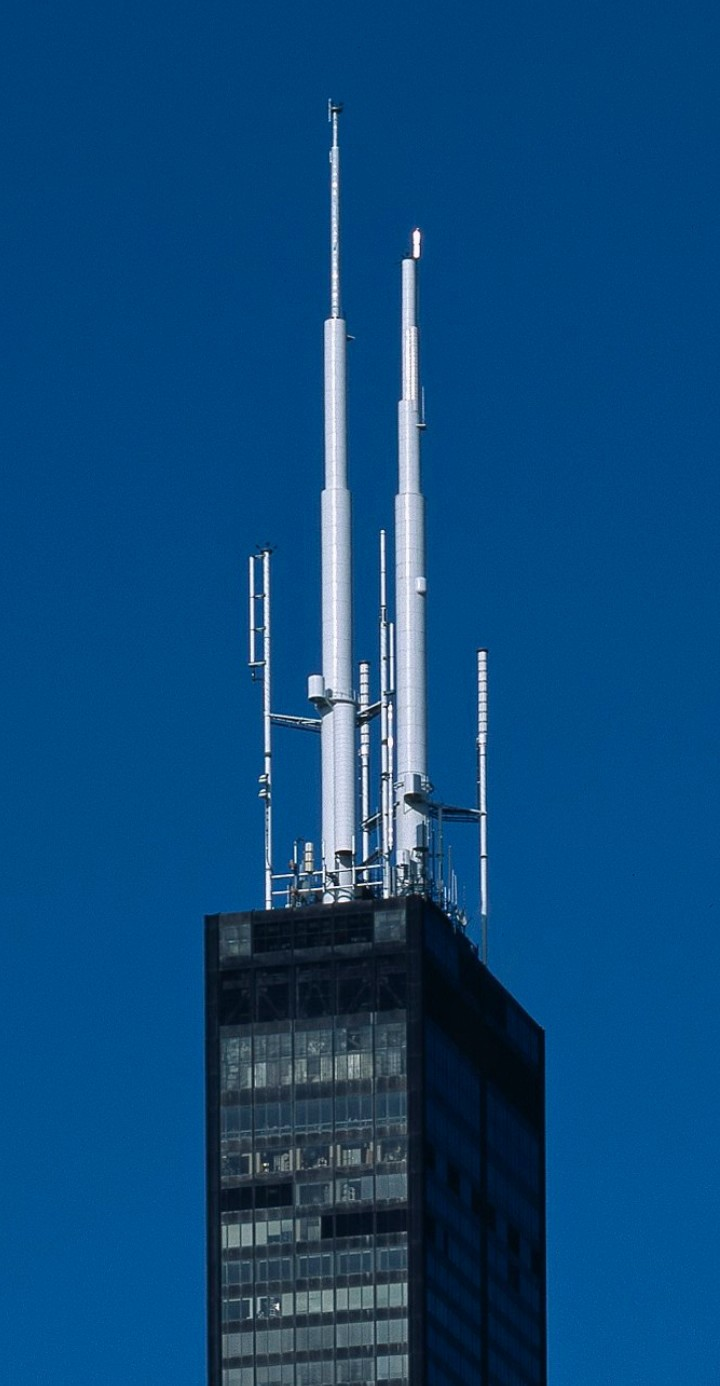
The tower's antennas

Many broadcast station transmitters are located at the top of the Willis Tower. Each list is ranked by height from the top down. Stations at the same height on the same mast indicate the use of a diplexer into the same shared antenna. Due to its extreme height, FM stations (all class B) are very limited in power output.

East mast

- 518 m:
  - WLS-TV 7, 1 MW, ABC Owned Television Stations
  - WXFT-DT 60, 1 MW, TelevisaUnivision
- 510 m:
  - WCPX-TV 38, 400 kW, Ion Media
  - WJYS TV 62, 140 kW, Millennial Telecommunications
- 509 m: WFLD 32, 435.5 kW, Fox Television Stations
- 500 m: WBBM-TV 2, 29.5 kW, CBS Television Stations
- 491 m: WBBM-TV 2, 31 kW, CBS Television Stations
- 482 m:
  - WCFS-FM 105.9 MHz, 4.1 kW, Audacy
  - WCHI-FM 95.5 MHz, 3.0 kW, iHeartMedia
  - WLIT-FM 93.9 MHz, 4.0 kW, iHeartMedia
- 480 m: WSCR-FM 104.3 MHz, 4.1 kW, Audacy
- 476 m: WTMX 101.9 MHz, 4.2 kW, Hubbard Broadcasting
- 474 m: WBBM-FM 96.3 MHz, 3.3 kW, Audacy
- 472 m:
  - WGCI-FM 107.5 MHz, 3.7 kW, iHeartMedia
  - WKSC-FM 103.5 MHz, 4.3 kW, iHeartMedia
- 470 m: WFMT FM 98.7 MHz, 6.0 kW, Window to the World Communications
- 468 m: WLS FM 94.7 MHz, 4.4 kW, Cumulus Media
- Unknown:
  - WRJK-LP 11, 0.09 kW, Major Market Broadcasting
  - W236CF 95.1 MHz, 0.06 kW, Uforia Audio Network
  - W280EM 103.9 MHz, 0.0 kW, Educational Media Foundation

West mast

- 520 m: WFLD 32, 1 MW, Fox Television Stations
- 509 m: WMAQ-TV 5, 398 kW, NBC Owned Television Stations
- 508 m:
  - WMAQ-TV 5, 350 kW, NBC Owned Television Stations
  - WSNS-TV 44, 350 kW, NBC Owned Television Stations
- 498 m: WGN-TV 9, 645 kW, Tribune Broadcasting
- 496 m: WTTW 9, 250 kW, Window to the World Communications
- 475 m:
  - WFLD 32, 1 MW, Fox Television Stations
  - WPWR-TV 50, 1 MW, Fox Television Stations
- 473 m: WCIU-TV 26, 1 MW, Weigel Broadcasting
- 460 m: WFMT FM 98.7 MHz, 6.0 kW, Window to the World Communications
- 451 m: WFMT FM 98.7 MHz, 6.0 kW, Window to the World Communications
- 444 m: WKQX FM 101.1 MHz, 3.7 kW, Cumulus Media
- 443 m:
  - WBBM-FM 96.3 MHz, 1.4 kW, Audacy
  - WSCR-FM 104.3 MHz, 5.0 kW, Audacy
- 442 m: W264BF FM 100.7 MHz, 0.006 kW, Calvary Radio Network
- Unknown:
  - WMEU-CD 18, 15 kW, Weigel Broadcasting
  - WWME-CD 20, 15 kW, Weigel Broadcasting
  - WEDE-CD 28, 2.84 kW, First United

NOAA Weather Radio station KWO39 transmits off the tower at 162.550 MHz. Programmed by the National Weather Service Weather Forecast Office in Chicago, it is equipped with Specific Area Message Encoding (SAME), which sets off a siren on specially programmed weather radios to alert of an impending hazard.

== Cultural depictions ==
The building has appeared in numerous films and television shows set in Chicago such as Ferris Bueller's Day Off, where Ferris and company visit the observation deck. Late Night with Conan O'Brien introduced a character called The Sears Tower Dressed In Sears Clothing when the show visited Chicago in 2006. The building is also featured in History Channel's Life After People, in which it and other human-made landmarks suffer from neglect without humans around, collapsing two hundred years after people are gone.

In the 2008 film The Dark Knight, it is part of Gotham City. In the 2011 film Transformers: Dark of the Moon, it is featured in a number of scenes. In the 2013 film Man of Steel, the tower is the location of the offices of the Daily Planet.

== Position in Chicago's skyline ==
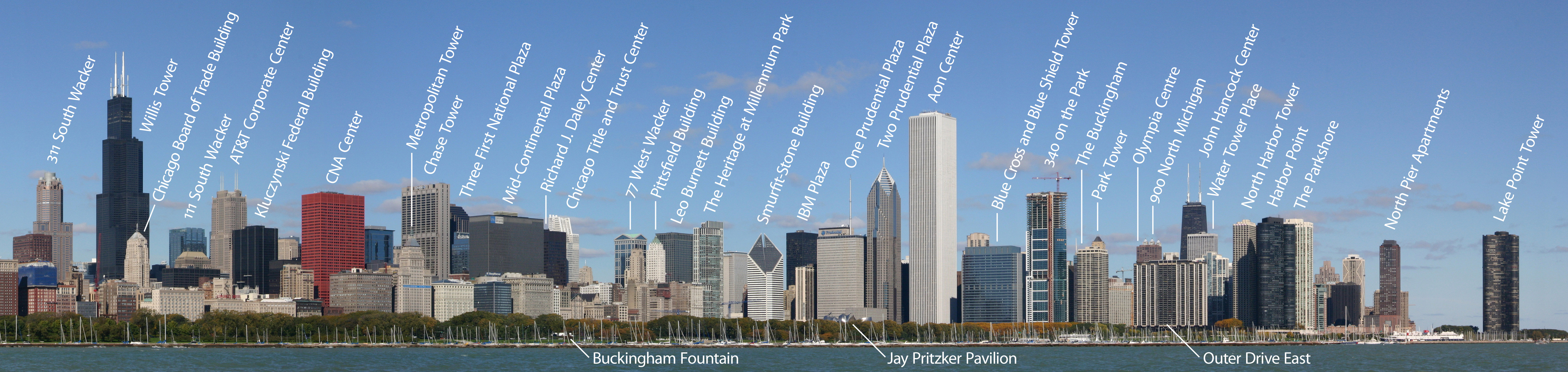

== See also ==
- Architecture of Chicago
- List of buildings with 100 floors or more
- History of the world's tallest structures
- List of tallest buildings by U.S. state
- List of tallest buildings in Chicago
- List of tallest buildings in the United States
- List of tallest buildings
- List of tallest freestanding structures in the world
- List of tallest freestanding steel structures
- List of tallest towers in the world
- Sears, Roebuck and Company Complex

== Notes ==
Records
| Preceded by One World Trade Center (1970) | Tallest building in the world 1,450 ft 1973–1998 | Succeeded by Petronas Towers |
| Preceded by One World Trade Center (1970) | World's tallest building architectural element 1,450 ft 1973–1998 | Succeeded by Petronas Towers |
| Preceded by One World Trade Center (1970) | Building with the most floors 108 floors 2001–2007 | Succeeded by Burj Khalifa |
| Preceded by One World Trade Center (1970) | World's tallest building rooftop 1,450 ft 1973–2003 | Succeeded by Taipei 101 |
| Preceded by One World Trade Center (1970) | Tallest building in the United States; 1,450 ft 1973–2013 | Succeeded by One World Trade Center (2006) |
| Preceded by Aon Center | Tallest building in Chicago; 1,450 ft 1973–present | Incumbent |
