= Towers Watson =

American professional services company

Towers Watson & Co.
- Logo from 2010 to 2016
- Traded as: NYSE: TW
- Industry: Professional services
- Predecessor: Towers Perrin; Watson Wyatt Worldwide
- Founded: 2010; 16 years ago
- Fate: Merged with Willis Group
- Successor: Willis Towers Watson
- Headquarters: Arlington, Virginia, United States
- Area served: Global
- Key people: John J. Haley (chairman, president, and CEO)
- Services: Employee benefits, talent management, rewards, and risk and capital management
- Revenue: ▲US$3.644 billion (2015)
- Net income: ▲US$384 million (2015)
- Total assets: ▼US$5.394 billion (2015)
- Total equity: ▼US$2.932 billion (2015)
- Number of employees: 16,300 (June 30, 2015)

Towers Watson & Co. was a global professional services firm that provided risk management services, human resource consulting, actuarial services, and investment management. The company operated in 37 countries. Customers included 92% of Fortune Global 500 companies and 84% of Fortune 1000 companies.

In 2016, the company was acquired by Willis Group in a merger of equals to form Willis Towers Watson.

== History ==
Towers Watson was formed on January 4, 2010, by the $4 billion merger of equals of Towers Perrin and Watson Wyatt Worldwide. The merger created the largest employee-benefits consulting firm by revenue worldwide.

Watson Wyatt Worldwide was formed by the 1995 alliance and 2005 merger between R. Watson & Sons (founded in 1878 by Reuben Watson) and The Wyatt Company (founded in 1946 by Birchard E. Wyatt). Towers, Perrin, Forster & Crosby was established in the U.S. in 1934: in 1987, the company shortened its name to Towers Perrin.

In February 2011, Towers Watson acquired EMB Consultancy. EMB specialized in property & casualty consulting. EMB also had software dealing with pricing, reserving, spatial smoothing analysis, capital and risk modelling.

In May 2012, the company acquired Extend Health, a provider of health-care insurance services and the operator of the largest private Medicare health insurance marketplace, for $435 million. In September 2013, IBM signed a contract to use the Extend Health platform for insurance services for it U.S retirees.

In November 2013, the company sold its reinsurance brokerage business to Jardine Lloyd Thompson for $250 million. That month, it also acquired Liazon, operator of the Bright Choices private health insurance marketplace, for $215 million.

In May 2015, the company acquired Acclaris, a provider of software and services for consumer-driven health care and reimbursement accounts such as health savings accounts, for $140 million.

In July 2015, the company sold its human resources service delivery practice to KPMG.

In September 2015, the company acquired Brovada Technologies for $15 million.

In 2016, the company was acquired by Willis Group in a merger of equals to form Willis Towers Watson.
