= Watson Wyatt Worldwide =

American consulting firm

Watson Wyatt Worldwide, Inc.
- Industry: Consulting
- Founded: 2005
- Defunct: 2010
- Successor: Towers Watson
- Headquarters: Arlington, Virginia, United States
- Number of locations: 106 offices (2009)
- Key people: John J. Haley – president, CEO, and chairman of the board
- Revenue: ▲US$1.68 billion (2009)
- Net income: ▲US$146 million (2009)
- Number of employees: 7,700 (2009)
- Website: WatsonWyatt.com

Watson Wyatt Worldwide, Inc. was a global consulting firm that merged in January 2010 with Towers Perrin to form Towers Watson. The firm's services included managing the cost and effectiveness of employee benefit programs; developing attraction, retention and reward strategies; advising pension plan sponsors and other institutions on optimal investment strategies; providing strategic and financial advice to insurance and financial service companies; and delivering related technology, outsourcing and data services. Its principal operating subsidiary, Watson Wyatt & Company, was a human capital consulting firm with operations in the Americas, Europe and Asia Pacific. Its corporate offices were in Arlington, Virginia.

== History ==
Reuben Watson formed the UK actuarial firm R. Watson & Sons in 1878. In 1943, Birchard Wyatt established The Wyatt Company as an actuarial consulting firm.

In 1995, the two firms formed a global alliance under the brand Watson Wyatt Worldwide. The U.S.-based arm of the alliance was renamed Watson Wyatt & Company and the UK firm was called Watson Wyatt LLP. In 2000, Watson Wyatt & Company completed a successful initial public offering and began trading on the New York Stock Exchange. In August 2005, the two firms formally merged and the new company was named Watson Wyatt Worldwide.

== 2007 transactions ==
During 2007, Watson Wyatt acquired three companies in Europe. It acquired its Netherlands-based alliance partner, Watson Wyatt Brans & Co. in February. In July, Watson Wyatt bought a German human resources consulting firm, Heissmann GmbH. It purchased Oakbridge Consulting Group in Sweden in October.

Also during 2007, Watson Wyatt acquired the talent management technology and consulting firm WisdomNet.

Also during 2007, Watson Wyatt announced that it would spin off its multiemployer retirement practices in the United States and Canada. (A multiemployer retirement plan is set up under the terms of collective bargaining agreements involving more than one unrelated employer, generally in the same industry.) Under the plan, Watson Wyatt would not own any portion of the new companies — Horizon Actuarial Services in the U.S. and PBI Actuarial Consultants in Canada — but it would receive a portion of the new firms' revenue for the next five years.

== 2007 Iron Workers pension fund settlement ==
On March 23, 2007, Watson Wyatt settled a lawsuit by the pension fund trustees of the Iron Workers, Local No. 25, of Michigan. The lawsuit alleged that the pension plan was underfunded as a result of the company's actuarial work. Under the settlement, Watson Wyatt paid $110 million but did not admit any wrongdoing.

== Merger ==
On June 28, 2009, it was announced that Towers Perrin and Watson Wyatt had agreed to merge into a new publicly traded company to be called Towers Watson; the merger was completed in January 2010.
