= Towers Perrin =

Global professional services firm

- Industry: Professional services
- Founded: March 1, 1934; 92 years ago
- Defunct: January 4, 2010; 16 years ago
- Successor: Towers Watson
- Headquarters: Stamford, Connecticut, USA
- Key people: Mark Mactas, CEO
- Services: Actuarial; Management consulting Insurance; Human Resources; Professional Services

Towers Perrin was a professional services firm that provided human resource consulting, financial services consulting, reinsurance intermediary services, as well as actuarial consulting services via its Tillinghast subsidiary. The firm was entirely owned by its employees. In 2010, the firm merged with Watson Wyatt Worldwide, forming Towers Watson.

== History ==
On March 1, 1934, Towers, Perrin, Forster & Crosby, founded by John Towers, Charles Perrin, Walter Forster & Arthur Crosby, opened for business in Philadelphia, Pennsylvania.

In 1982, the company acquired Cresap, McCormick and Paget, general management consultants.

In 1986, the company acquired Tillinghast, Nelson & Warren.

In 1987, Towers Perrin was established as the umbrella name for the firm.

In December 2001, the company acquired Working Concepts, a human resources firm.

In November 2002, the company acquired London-based reinsurance broker Denis M. Clayton & Co.

In September 2004, Russell Investment Group acquired the company's Australia pension consulting and employee benefits business.

In January 2005, the company sold its human-resources outsourcing unit to Electronic Data Systems (EDS) for $420 million. In addition, ExcellerateHRO, a venture owned 85% by EDS and 15% by the company was formed to provide HR-related outsourcing services as work force administration, employee recruitment and relocation, as well as traditional benefits administration. In 2009, the company sold its minority stake in the venture to Hewlett-Packard, which had acquired EDS.

In July 2005, the company acquired Rauser AG, a German pension consulting services firm.

In July 2006, the company acquired Risk Capital Management Partners, which provided financial risk management services to companies in the financial services, energy, utilities and mining industries.

In March 2007, the company acquired ISR, which surveys employees on working conditions.

On January 4, 2010, Towers Perrin merged with Watson Wyatt Worldwide, forming Towers Watson, the largest employee-benefits consulting firm by revenue worldwide.
