= Insurance broker =

Intermediary between buyers and sellers of insurance

An insurance broker is an intermediary who sells, solicits, or negotiates insurance on behalf of a client for compensation. An insurance broker is distinct from an insurance agent in that a broker typically acts on behalf of a client by negotiating with multiple insurers, while an agent represents one or more specific insurers under a contract.

As of 2019, the largest insurance brokers in the world by revenue are Marsh & McLennan, Aon plc, Willis Towers Watson, Arthur J. Gallagher, Hub International, and Lockton Companies.

== In Australia ==
In Australia, all insurance brokers are required under the Financial Services Reform Act 2001 to be licensed by the federal government's Australian Securities and Investments Commission (ASIC). Reputable and experienced insurance brokers in Australia will generally also hold additional qualifications such as a certificate or diploma in financial services which requires the completion of in depth studies in a specific area, the most common being general insurance or insurance brokering.

Within Australia there are also a number of industry bodies that issue professional accreditations to members that comply with best standards of professional practice and integrity and maintain up to date skills and knowledge. The two main accreditations are the Australian and New Zealand Institute of Insurance and Finance (ANZIIF) Certified Insurance Professional (CIP) and National Insurance Brokers Association (NIBA) Qualified Practicing Insurance Broker (QPIB) qualifications.

Dealing with an insurance broker as opposed to directly with an insurer is something many customers (particularly businesses) choose to do in Australia for reasons including: the ease of having the "shopping around done for them"; having the opportunity for premium funding which allows for larger insurance policies to be paid in installments rather than all at once; dealing with one broker for all policies from the car insurance to professional indemnity insurance rather than dealing directly with several insurers; and, the ease of having claims managed by the broker who deals directly with the insurer on the client's behalf.

== In Canada ==
In Canada, insurance brokers are regulated on a provincial and territorial basis. Insurance brokers and insurance agents are licensed and regulated by the same entity in most of Canada; either an arms-length organization, such as the General Insurance Council of Saskatchewan, or directly by a government body. In some provinces, such as Ontario, insurance brokers have self-governing bodies responsible for licensing and regulation.

== In the United Kingdom ==
Insurance broker became a regulated term under the Insurance Brokers (Registration) Act 1977, which was designed to prevent firms holding themselves as brokers but in fact acting as representative of one or more favoured insurance companies. The term has no legal definition following the repeal of the 1977 Act. The sale of general insurance was regulated by the Financial Services Authority from 14 January 2005 until 31 March 2013 and by the Financial Conduct Authority since 1 April 2013. Any person or firm authorized by the Authority can now call themselves an insurance broker.

Insurance brokerage is largely associated with general insurance (car, house etc.) rather than life insurance, although some brokers continued to provide investment and life insurance brokerage until the onset of new regulation in 2001. This drove a more transparent regime, based predominantly on upfront negotiation of a fee for the provision of advice and/or services. This saw the splitting of intermediaries into two groups: general insurance intermediaries/brokers and independent financial advisers (IFAs) for life insurance, investments and pensions.

General insurance brokering is carried out today by many types of authorized organisations including traditional high street brokers and telephone or web-based firms.

The British Insurance Brokers' Association is a representative organisation for brokers in the UK. It has over 1800 members. Howden Insurance was named British Insurance Awards Insurance Broker of the Decade in 2024.

== In the United States ==
Accidents will happen (William H. Watson, 1922) is a slapstick silent film about the methods and mishaps of an American insurance broker. Collection EYE Film Institute Netherlands.

In the United States, insurance brokers are regulated by individual states. Most states require anyone who sells, solicits, or negotiates insurance in that state to obtain an insurance broker license, with certain limited exceptions. This includes a business entity, the business entity's officers or directors (the "sub licensees" through whom the business entity operates), and individual employees. In order to obtain a broker's license, a person typically must take pre-licensing courses and pass an examination. An insurance broker also must submit an application (with an application fee) to the state insurance regulator in the state in which the applicant wishes to do business, who will determine whether the insurance broker has met all the state requirements and will typically do a background check to determine whether the applicant is considered trustworthy and competent. A criminal conviction, for example, may result in a state determining that the applicant is untrustworthy or incompetent. Some states also require applicants to submit fingerprints.

Once licensed, an insurance broker generally must take continuing education courses when their licenses reach a renewal date. For example, the state of California requires license renewals every 2 years, which is accomplished by completing continuing education courses. Most states have reciprocity agreements whereby brokers from one state can become easily licensed in another state. As a result of the federal Gramm-Leach-Bliley Act, most states have adopted uniform licensing laws, with 47 states being deemed reciprocal by the National Association of Insurance Commissioners. A state may revoke, suspend, or refuse to renew an insurance broker's license if at any time the state determines (typically after notice and a hearing) that the broker has engaged in any activity that makes him untrustworthy or incompetent.

Because of industry regulation, smaller brokerage firms can easily compete with larger ones, and in most states, all insurance brokers generally are forbidden by law from providing their customers with rebates or inducements.

Insurance brokers play a significant role in helping companies and individuals procure property and casualty (liability) insurance, life insurance and annuities, and accident and health insurance. For example, research shows that brokers play a significant role in helping small employers find health insurance, particularly in more competitive markets. Average small group commissions range from two percent to eight percent of premiums. Brokers provide services beyond procuring insurance, such as providing risk assessments, insurance consulting services, insurance-related regulatory and legislative updates, claims assistance services, assisting with employee enrollment, and helping to resolve benefit issues. However, some states consider the provision of services that are unrelated to the insurance procured through the broker to be an impermissible rebate or inducement.

Negligence on the part of insurance brokers can have severe effects upon clients when they discover their insurance coverage is worthless. In one case, Near North Entertainment Insurance Services provided alternative rock band Third Eye Blind with a commercial general liability (CGL) insurance policy that excluded coverage for the "entertainment business". After insurance coverage for a lawsuit was denied because Third Eye Blind was and is, after all, in the entertainment business, the California Court of Appeal ruled in a published opinion that a subsequent court ruling establishing that the insurer had wrongfully denied coverage—that the insurer had a duty to defend the band and had breached that duty—did not absolve the broker of its duty to advise the band it needed something more than a basic CGL policy (namely, errors and omissions insurance).

=== Spitzer investigations ===
In 2004, New York Attorney General Eliot Spitzer found apparent cases of bid-rigging by the major brokers, where the brokers arranged with insurers to provide "fake" quotes in exchange for providing favorable risks amidst contingent commission arrangements. In 2008, AIG paid $125 million to settle with 9 states.

=== Commission and fees ===
In most states there is no requirement to disclose the commission of the broker to the customer, but in New York, a regulation ("Regulation 194") was adopted in 2011 which required disclosure. Brokers or agents may decide to reveal their commission upon request.

In most states, agents cannot charge a fee in addition to their commission, although Texas is one of the exceptions.

=== Broker vs. agent ===
Though not an absolute separation, an insurance agent is an insurance company's representative by way of agent-principal legal custom. The agent's primary alliance is with the insurance carrier, not the insurance buyer. In contrast, an insurance broker represents the insured, generally has no contractual agreements with insurance carriers, and relies on common or direct methods of perfecting business transactions with insurance carriers. This can have a significant beneficial impact on insurance negotiations obtained through a broker (vs. those obtained from an agent).

Any person acting as an insurance agent or broker must be licensed to do so by the state or jurisdiction that the person is operating in. Whereas states previously would issue separate licenses for agents and brokers, most states now issue a single producer license regardless if the person is acting on behalf of the insured or insurer. The term insurance producers is used to reference both insurance agents and brokers.

== In Switzerland ==
In Switzerland, 11,292 independent brokers are registered with the Swiss Financial Market Supervisory Authority (FINMA). A wave of consolidation is under way to meet the growing regulatory demands, and major foreign players are investing in this market.

== Disintermediation ==
As in many industries, there is a trend toward disintermediation where consumers buy directly from the insurer without an intermediary. However, the $46 billion online vehicle, home, and life insurance markets for retail consumers have accelerated since 2012, with the rise of insurance comparison websites. Publicly traded companies Amazon, Walmart, and Google continue to disrupt how consumers purchase insurance with varying success. Google, later exited the online insurance comparison market in 2016, and Allstate threatened to shutter their online consumer brand Esurance after disappointing profits.

== See also ==
- Financial adviser
- Loss-control consultant
