= Cogan, Berlind, Weill & Levitt =

American investment banking and brokerage firm

- CBWL logo
- Industry: Financial services
- Predecessor: Carter, Berlind, Potoma & Weill (1960–62); Carter, Berlind & Weill (1962–69)
- Founded: 1960
- Founder: Arthur L. Carter, Roger Berlind, Sanford I. Weill
- Defunct: 1972 (name is dropped); 1981 (firm is acquired)
- Fate: Dropped usage of the name in 1972, acquired by American Express in 1981
- Successor: Hayden, Stone & Co. Shearson Hayden Stone; Shearson Loeb Rhoades; Shearson/American Express
- Headquarters: New York City, United States
- Key people: Arthur Levitt, Marshall Cogan, Peter Potoma
- Products: Brokerage, Investment banking

Cogan, Berlind, Weill & Levitt, originally Carter, Berlind, Potoma & Weill, was an American investment banking and brokerage firm founded in 1960 and acquired by American Express in 1981. In its two decades as an independent firm, Cogan, Berlind, Weill & Levitt served as a vehicle for the rollup of more than a dozen brokerage and securities firms led by Sanford I. Weill that culminated in the formation of Shearson Loeb Rhoades.

Among the firms most notable partners were Sanford I. Weill, Arthur Levitt, Arthur L. Carter, Marshall Cogan, Roger Berlind, and Peter Potoma.

== History ==
=== Early history ===
In May 1960, Arthur L. Carter, Roger Berlind, Peter Potoma, and Sanford I. Weill formed Carter, Berlind, Potoma & Weill, the firm's earliest predecessor with capital of $200,000 contributed by the four partners. The firm's first office was at 37 Wall Street, which was followed by an office at 60 Broad Street and then 55 Broad Street. The firm brought in $400,000 (equivalent to $3.2 million in 2024) in revenue in 1960.

Carter, Berlind, as it was then known, initially carved out a niche as a small research boutique, though it also offered brokerage and investment banking services The firm was nicknamed "the Jewish DLJ" in reference to Donaldson, Lufkin & Jenrette, a former investment banking firm acquired by Credit Suisse in 2000.

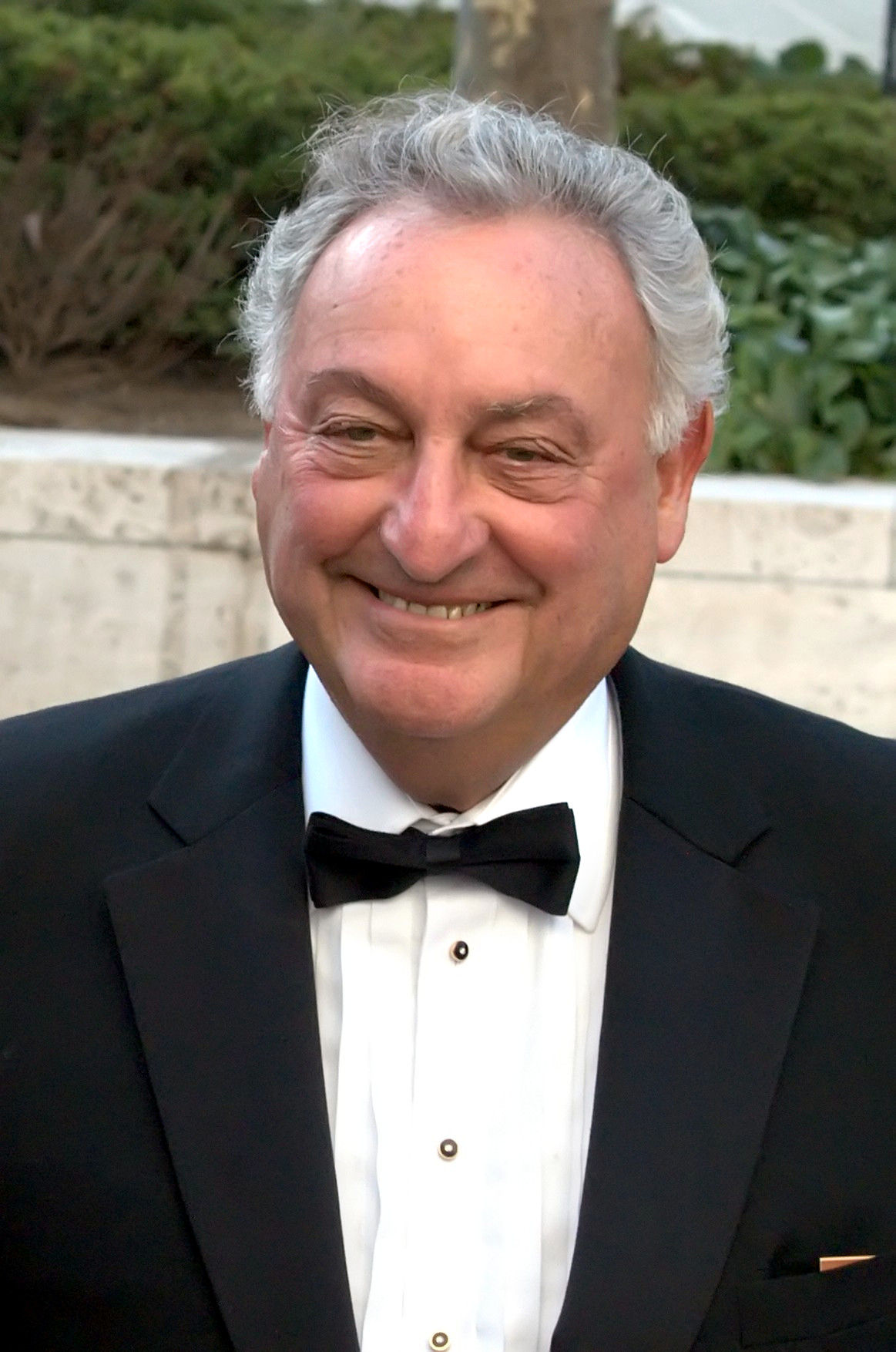
Sandy Weill

In the winter of 1962, the firm learned from the New York Stock Exchange surveillance officer that Peter Potoma face suspension for "free riding", a violation of the NYSE rules for which he would be suspended by the NYSE for one year. Shortly before his suspension, the other partners forced Potoma's resignation and dropped his name from the firm, becoming Carter, Berlind & Weill. In 1963, Arthur Levitt, the future chairman of the Securities and Exchange Commission joined the firm. The next year, Marshall Cogan, who had previously worked at CBS and investment firm Orvis & Co., joined the firm as an auto sector research analyst, later becoming a partner.

Weill served as the firm's chairman beginning in 1965 and extending through its 1981 merger with American Express, ultimately leaving the firm in 1984. This period was marked by major consolidation of the old white shoe firms on Wall Street. Carter, Berlind under Weill's leadership was a driving force in this consolidation. During this period, Weill led Carter, Berlind, and its successors through more than 15 acquisitions. Carter, Berlind made its first acquisition in 1967, taking over Bernstein-Macaulay Inc., a well-respected firm founded by Peter L. Bernstein, that specialized in investment management.

Arthur Carter, increasingly unhappy at the firm, sold out his stake to his partners for several million dollars in 1968 and pursued a number of personal investments in manufacturing companies. Carter would go on to own a number of media properties first acquiring The Nation and later founding The New York Observer. On February 19, 1969, the firm changed its name to Cogan, Berlind, Weill & Levitt (CBWL), with the arrival of Marshall Cogan and Arthur Levitt. The firm was often referred to jokingly by Wall Street peers as "Corned Beef With Lettuce". The firm brought in $19 million in 1969 (equivalent to $120 million in 2024).

In addition to the firm's notable acquisitions, Carter Berlind, and later CBWL, was known for developing a number of future Wall Street executives. In 1970, Peter A. Cohen joined CBWL-Hayden Stone and in 1973, Cohen became special assistant to Weill. Cohen would go on to serve as chairman and CEO of the firm's successor, Shearson Lehman Brothers in the 1980s. Today, Cohen serves as chairman and CEO of Cowen Group, formerly known as Cowen & Company. Similarly, Joe Plumeri, who later became president & managing partner of Shearson Lehman Brothers in 1990, and subsequently CEO of Willis Group Holdings, joined CBWL in the 1960s. Looking for a part-time job while in law school, Plumeri incorrectly assumed CBWL to be a law firm. Despite the confusion, Weill hired Plumeri as a part-time clerk and gofer.

=== Acquisition of Hayden Stone ===
On September 11, 1970, following the acquisition of Hayden, Stone & Co., the firm was renamed CBWL-Hayden, Stone, Inc. to capitalize on the brand name of the older and much larger, albeit financially challenged, Hayden Stone. Hayden Stone, founded in 1892 had a large retail network and a significant investment banking department. Additionally, Hayden Stone had grossed $113 million in 1968, five times its gross in 1960, earning significant profits. However, in the late 1960s, Hayden Stone had difficulties with its administrative functions, particularly as the size of the firm had expanded so rapidly. The firm was ultimately forced by the New York Stock Exchange to cut back on its trading. By 1970, the firm was effectively controlled by a group of creditors. CBWL negotiated to acquire the bulk of Hayden Stone from its creditors including the firm's name, 28 of its branches with 500 brokers and roughly 50,000 accounts. By acquiring Hayden Stone, CBWL launched itself from relative obscurity to become a major firm on Wall Street. In 1970, the firm employed more than 1,500 people, and brought in nearly $12 million in revenue.

In fact, the acquisition was so transformative for CBWL that in 1972, the CBWL was dropped from the name and the firm became Hayden Stone, Inc. in 1972. In August 1973, Marshall Cogan left the firm after disputes with his fellow partners to focus on leveraged buyouts. Cogan would go on to acquire a series of businesses included General Felt Industries, Knoll, the 21 Club and Sheller-Globe Corporation but would be unsuccessful in his bids to acquire the Boston Red Sox, Sotheby's and L.F. Rothschild.

=== Consolidation in the 1970s – Shearson Hammill ===
Following the acquisition of Hayden, Stone & Co., the newly minted Hayden Stone, Inc. continued its strategy of growth by acquisition. In 1973, during the 1973-1974 stock market crash, the firm acquired H. Hentz & Co., a venerable Wall Street investment banking, brokerage and commodities firm founded in 1850, and Saul Lerner & Company.

As economic conditions worsened in 1974, Weill had the opportunity to acquire Shearson, Hammill & Co., founded in 1902. Following the merger with Shearson Hammill & Co., the name of the combined company was changed again, this time becoming Shearson Hayden Stone. Weill adopted the Shearson brand, which had become a household name in the 1960s through a series of television commercials that suggested "If You Want To Know What's Going On On Wall Street, Ask Shearson Hammill." The firm had 63 offices in the US and internationally supported by a well-regarded securities research department.

In 1976, after completing the integration of the two companies, the successor, Shearson Hayden Stone, made two notable purchases: Lamson Brothers & Co., a commodities brokerage founded in the 19th century and Faulkner, Dawkins & Sullivan, a regional brokerage with an excellent equity research department. With these acquisitions, in 1977 the combined firm was the seventh largest investment banking firm in the United States, with revenues of $134 million (equivalent to $540 million in 2024, more than triple its 1972 levels just five years earlier) and more than 4,000 employees nationwide.

=== Finishing the puzzle – Loeb Rhoades ===
In 1979, Weill and the firm's successor, now Shearson Hayden Stone completed their most ambitious merger to that point, acquiring Loeb, Rhoades, Hornblower & Co. to make Shearson Loeb Rhoades the second largest investment banking firm. With capital totaling $250 million, Shearson Loeb Rhoades trailed only Merrill Lynch, Pierce, Fenner & Smith as the securities industry's largest firm.

Until shortly before the acquisition by Shearson, the firm, known as Loeb, Rhoades & Co., was one of Wall Street's oldest and most successful firms. In 1977, Loeb Rhoades acquired Hornblower, Weeks, Noyes & Trask to form Loeb, Rhoades, Hornblower & Co. The Hornblower merger turned out to be disastrous for Loeb Rhoades. The two firms incurred significant costs attempting to merge their back office operations, both of which had issues prior to the merger. By the end of 1978, less than a year after the merger, the combined firm was losing millions of dollars. During Mothers Day Weekend 1979, Loeb and Shearson agreed to a merger to form Shearson Loeb Rhoades. Weill was named the CEO of the combined firm and John Loeb became the firm's chairman.

=== Sale to American Express ===
In 1981 Shearson Loeb Rhoades was sold to American Express for about $930 million in stock to form Shearson/American Express, later known as Shearson Lehman Brothers following the 1984 acquisition of Lehman Brothers. In 1993, American Express decided to divest Shearson Lehman Brothers, completing an IPO of Lehman Brothers, a spinoff of the remaining Lehman Brothers Holdings Inc shares to shareholders on 5/31/1994, and selling the core of what had been Shearson prior to the merger with Lehman Brothers to Sanford I. Weill's Primerica.

== Notable former staff ==
- Roger Berlind, theatrical producer and long-time board member of Lehman Brothers
- Arthur L. Carter, later owner of The Nation and founder of the New York Observer
- Peter A. Cohen, CEO of Shearson Lehman Hutton and current CEO of the Cowen Group
- Marshall Cogan, future private equity investor and founder of United Automotive Group
- Clarence Benjamin Jones, lawyer, advisor and speech writer of Martin Luther King Jr., and financial services executive
- Arthur Levitt, chairman of the Securities and Exchange Commission
- Joe Plumeri, Citigroup executive, chairman and CEO of the Willis Group, and owner of the Trenton Thunder
- Sanford I. Weill, chairman and CEO of Citigroup
- Frank G. Zarb, Energy Czar under President Gerald Ford, and former chairman of NASDAQ

== Acquisition history ==
The following is an illustration of the CBWL's major mergers and acquisitions by which the firm was able to consolidate into Shearson/American Express and later Shearson Lehman Hutton (this is not a comprehensive list):

- Shearson Lehman Hutton (merged 1988)
  - Shearson Lehman Brothers (merged 1984)
    - Shearson/American Express (merged 1981)
      - American Express
        (est. 1850)
      - Shearson Loeb Rhoades (acquired 1981)
        - Shearson Hayden Stone (merged 1973)
          - CBWL-Hayden Stone (later Hayden Stone, Inc. merged 1970)
            - Cogan, Berlind, Weill & Levitt
              (formerly Carter, Berlind, Potoma & Weill, est. 1960)
            - Hayden, Stone & Co.
          - Shearson, Hammill & Co.
            (est. 1902)
        - Loeb, Rhoades, Hornblower & Co. (merged 1978)
          - Loeb, Rhoades & Co. (merged 1937)
            - Carl M. Loeb & Co.
              (est. 1931)
            - Rhoades & Company
              (est. 1905)
          - Hornblower, Weeks, Noyes & Trask (merged 1953–1977)
            - Hornblower & Weeks
              (est. 1888)
            - Hemphill, Noyes & Co.
              (est. 1919, acq. 1963)
            - Spencer Trask & Co.
              (est. 1866 as Trask & Brown)
            - Paul H. Davis & Co.
              (est. 1920, acq. 1953)
    - Lehman Brothers Kuhn Loeb (merged 1977)
      - Lehman Brothers
        (est. 1850)
      - Kuhn, Loeb & Co.
        (est. 1867)
      - Abraham & Co.
        (est. 1938, acq. 1975)
  - E. F. Hutton & Co.
    (est. 1904)

== See also ==
- Shearson Lehman Hutton
