= Gordon Brunton =

British businessman, publisher, racehorse owner & breeder (1921-2017)

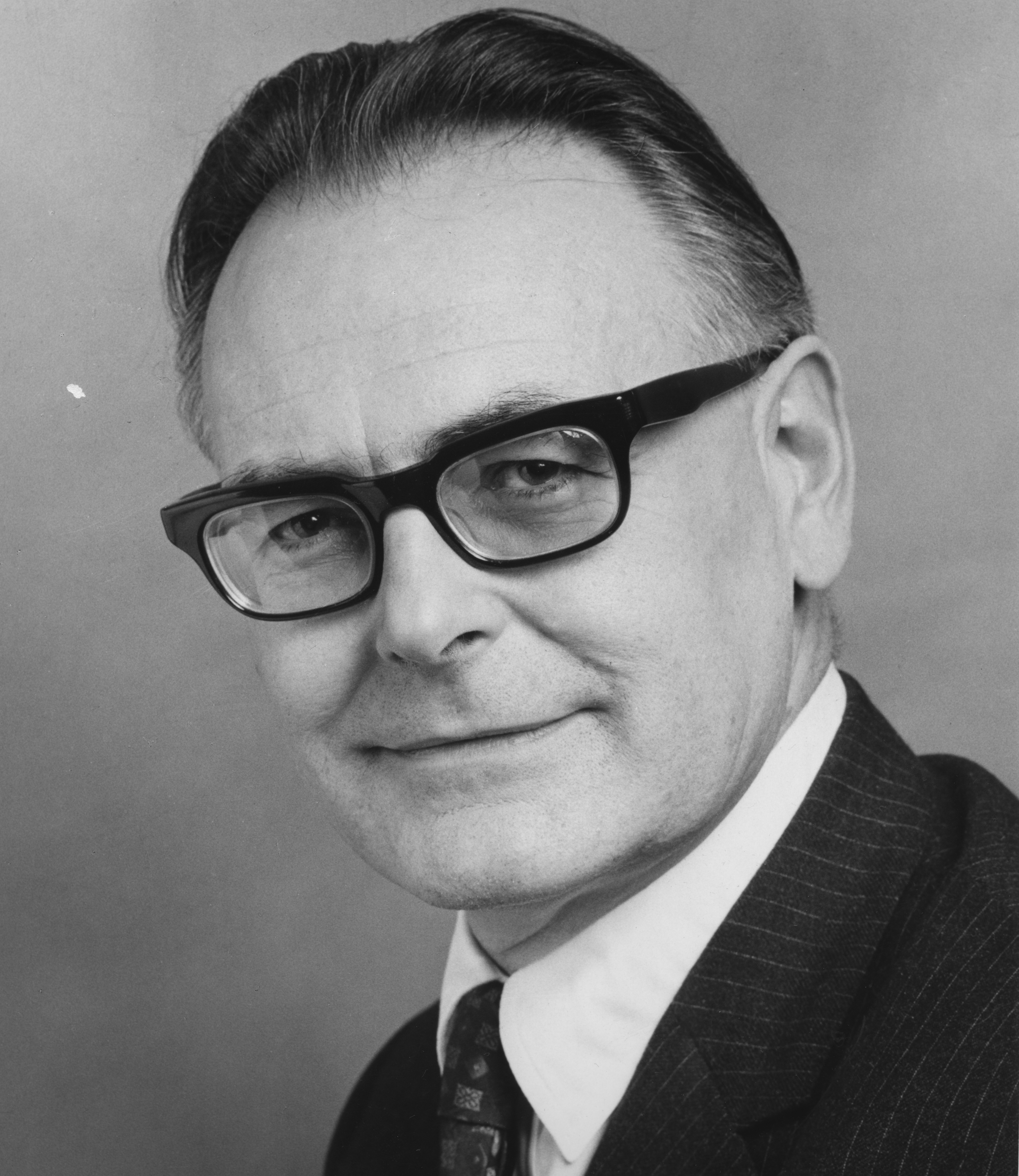
Gordon Brunton, 1970

Sir Gordon Charles Brunton (27 December 1921 – 30 May 2017) was a British businessman, publisher, racehorse owner and breeder.

== Early life, education and military service ==
Born in London, Brunton was educated briefly at Cranleigh School, Surrey and then at the London School of Economics where he studied at Peterhouse in Cambridge as wartime evacuees under Harold Laski, John Maynard Keynes, RH Tawney, Joan Robinson and Eileen Power. It was Laski's arguments and ideas that had a particular influence on Gordon Brunton's thinking.

During the onset of World War II, Brunton left university prematurely and was commissioned into the Royal Artillery in 1941. He went on to serve as a Captain in the Indian Army. Upon deciding he preferred working with Indian troops, he learned Urdu and began a short stint in 16th Punjab Regiment 16th Indian Anti-Tank Regiment ARTY training troops at Sialkot and then the 5th Mahratta Light Infantry ARTY part of the 5th Indian Division within Slim's 'forgotten' Fourteenth Army.

The regiment fought in the Burma campaign at Imphal during the Japanese offensive, the Battle of Kohima, Battle of the Admin Box at Letse and the Battle of the Sittang Bend. The regiment was incorporated into the Twelfth Army (United Kingdom) and Brunton served at Army HQ in Mingaladon. In 1946 he joined the British Military Government in Düsseldorf and Hamburg working on the refugee crisis and the reconstruction of local infrastructure and administration.

== The Thomson Organisation, Publishing, Travel, North Sea Oil and Times Newspapers ==
=== Joining Thomson ===
After the war, Brunton worked as a door to door salesman selling classified advertising space to small businesses outside London. Before venturing into small publishing houses Tothill Press, Tower Press and Odhams Press. Sir Christopher Chancellor had worked with Brunton and quietly suggested to Roy Thomson, 1st Baron Thomson of Fleet that he hire Brunton to diversify his UK business.

In 1961 Roy Thomson, 1st Baron Thomson of Fleet hired Brunton as managing director of Thomson Publications Thomson Corporation now Thomson Reuters.

Brunton went onto work for the 2nd Baron, Lord Thomson of Fleet Kenneth Thomson who succeeded his late father in 1976.

=== Chief Executive 1966-84 ===
Brunton was Chief Executive of Thomson Newspapers & International Thomson Organisation Ltd (ITOL) Thomson Corporation from 1966 to 1984 during the Thomson period of global expansion and diversification into travel, oil, print, book, magazine, newspaper, trade and technical press and local directory publishing. By the late 1970s ITOL had become one of the largest and most influential companies in the world.

Brunton retired from Thomson in 1985. He has been credited as being a major architect in the construction and diversification of the Thomson Corporation during the firms years as a conglomerate.

=== Travel ===
Of particular note was during the late 1960s, with Gordon Brunton leading the diversification into the package tour business for Thomson, this was later supported by his friend from the LSE Vladimir Raitz, founder of Horizon Holiday Group. Thomson Holidays now TUI AG grew with the acquisition of Sky Tours, Rivera Holidays and a then small air carrier Britannia Airways. Britannia became a major charter airline and Thomson leased a fleet of Boeing 737-200 aircraft, becoming the first European carrier to buy the Boeing product. Brunton believed Thomson had certain advantages in entering the travel market, at a time when tastes were changing for British holidaymakers with shifting aspirations for overseas holidays.

The major expenses for travel companies were the print brochures and the PR and advertising space needed to promote package holidays.

Brunton argued that Thomson held an advantage over their competitors with their printing presses, free access to their media empire with advertising and editorial capacity in their national and regional newspaper network. This put Thomson ahead of other package tour operators. This gamble despite considerable opposition within Thomson management, proved highly successful and within a few years Thomson became one of the market leaders in European travel, competing for dominance with the Court Line group.

=== North Sea Oil ===
In the early 1970s, Brunton instigated ITOL's highly risky and calculated gamble into the North Sea oil venture with the late Dr Armand Hammer and Occidental Petroleum and J. Paul Getty.

Initially a speculative consortium seeking new fields, it established both the Piper Alpha and Claymore fields and the Flotta Refinery on the island of Orkney. Under government regulations, of the time, the Americans desperately needed a supportive British partner and Thomson had significant influence in Scotland as Roy Thomson had owned both The Scotsman newspaper since 1953 and Scottish Television from his early days in Britain. In 1972 the consortium was successful in its application for a North Sea license.

These North Sea revenues enabled Thomson to further diversify into specialist and technical publishing in North America and acquire multiple companies during the 1970s and 1980s.

=== Times Newspapers ===
More challenging times lay ahead as Brunton performed a leading role in the prolonged print union conflict of The Times and Sunday Times during the late 1970s and early 1980s. Roy Thomson had previously purchased the titles from the Astor family in 1967 to form Times Newspapers Limited. After many years of disruption, Thomson Management eventually took a particularly hard stance against the more militant elements of the print unions, which resulted in the closure of the loss-making Times Newspapers from 1 December 1978 to 12 November 1979. However Times Newspapers continued to pay staff and company overheads during the closure.

The losses at The Times eventually led to the decision of the Thomson family to sell both titles to News International at which Brunton acted as the chief negotiator for Thomson. Rupert Murdoch was identified as the only viable buyer for The Times and Sunday Times as he provided assurances that both newspaper titles would remain in single ownership and in circulation. Other bidders were only interested in the profitable Sunday Times and would have shut down The Times. Brunton was adamant this could not be allowed to happen and Thomson decided in 1981 to sell the titles to News International.

=== Social Enterprise ===
During Gordon Brunton's era at the International Thomson Organisation, the company established a number of community redevelopment and local economic regeneration programs including a model scheme in Neath, South Wales.

== Sotheby's Chairmanship ==
Gordon Brunton's reputation of being a safe pair of hands and a skilled negotiator resulted in undertaking a crisis management role at the troubled auction house Sotheby's as chairman. During this turbulent period, Brunton made enforced cuts and personnel changes to bring stability to a business which had been judged to have been poorly mismanaged.

He succeeded auctioneer Peter Wilson. His role was to stabilize the business and latterly hold off the well documented 1983 hostile takeover bid from New Jersey carpet and felt makers Marshall Cogan and Stephen Swid of General Felt Industries and Knoll International. The Board consensus was neither Cogan or Swid were suitable buyers and eventually the company was sold to real estate developer A. Alfred Taubman.

== Other businesses ==
Brunton was subsequently chairman at Mercury Communications, Cable and Wireless Communications PLC, Racing Post, Bemrose PLC, NXT PLC, Galahad Gold and others.

== Horse racing ==
Brunton was a well known racehorse owner and breeder, most notably of Indian Queen, winner of the 1991 Ascot Gold Cup.

== Other ==
Awarded: Knighthood 1985

Club: Garrick Club Pilgrims Society Thirty Club

Fellow: London School of Economics

Recreations: Books, breeding thoroughbred racehorses

Married: Twice
