= Synbio =

Synbio may refer to:

- Synthetic Biology, an area of biological research that combines science and engineering.
- SynBio, a biological research project based in Russia, which is developing treatments against types of cancer and other diseases.
