= IMCB =

IMCB may refer to:

- It's Magic, Charlie Brown
- International Medical Commission on Bhopal
- Institute of Molecular and Cell Biology (disambiguation)
- Independent Mobile Classification Board, a defunct NGO replaced by the British Board of Film Classification
