= Marshall Cogan =

Marshall S. Cogan
- Born: 1937 (age 88–89)
- Education: Harvard Business School; Harvard University; Boston Latin School
- Occupations: Investment banker, Private equity investor
- Known for: Partner of Cogan, Berlind, Weill & Levitt, Founder of United Automotive Group and Foamex International

Marshall S. Cogan (born 1937) is an American investor and entrepreneur and former financier and trader. Cogan was the founder of United Automotive Group, which he built into one of the largest retailers of cars and trucks in the U.S. As a private equity investor, Cogan acquired a number of businesses in the 1970s and 1980s. He was also a partner of Cogan, Berlind, Weill & Levitt an investment banking and brokerage firm that would be instrumental in the consolidation of the financial services industry in the 1970s.

== Early life and education ==
Born to a Jewish family, Cogan graduated from Harvard College in 1959 and received his MBA from Harvard Business School. Cogan is also an alumnus and benefactor of the Boston Latin School having graduated in 1955.

== Career ==
=== Early career ===
Cogan started his career at CBS and worked at the investment firm, Orvis & Co., before joining the investment banking and brokerage firm of Carter, Berlind & Weill as an auto sector research analyst in 1964. Cogan was soon a partner in the firm and his name replaced the departing Arthur L. Carter in 1968 as the firm was renamed Cogan, Berlind, Weill & Levitt. Among Cogan's partners at CBWL were Sandy Weill, later chairman and CEO of Citigroup, Arthur Levitt, later the head of the Securities and Exchange Commission and Roger Berlind a noted Broadway producer and long-time member of the board of Lehman Brothers.

In August 1973, Marshall Cogan left the firm after disputes with his fellow partners to focus on leveraged buyouts. Cogan's first deal was the takeover of General Felt Industries (GFI) in 1974 which he completed with fellow investment banker Stephen Swid. Cogan would then merge GFI with Knoll International and use Knoll as a holding company to acquire a series of businesses. Among Cogan's most notable acquisitions were takeover of the Sheller-Globe Corporation and later the purchase of the 21 Club. Cogan was unsuccessful in his high profile bids to acquire the Boston Red Sox, Sotheby's and L.F. Rothschild in the buyout boom of the 1980s.

=== Foamex and United Auto ===
Cogan began building what would become Foamex International in the mid-1980s after the departure of his long-time partner Stephen Swid. Swid would go on to acquire the music publishing division of CBS Records, later known as SBK Records. Meanwhile, Cogan bought Foamex Products, a division of Firestone Tire & Rubber. Over the next few years, Cogan continued to acquire businesses to merge with Foamex, acquiring three regional producers in 1988. Cogan merged General Felt into Foamex and acquired Great Western Foam Co., a major foam producer on the West Coast. In 1993, Cogan created Foamex International bringing together his various businesses and took the company public in December 1993. During the mid-1990s, Foamex grew to become the largest manufacturer and marketer of flexible polyurethane foam and foam products in North America.

In 1990, Cogan founded United Automotive Group, today known as Penske Automotive Group. Under Cogan, United Auto was a leading acquirer, consolidator and operator of automobile and truck dealership franchises. Cogan merged his company with Roger Penske's business in May 1999 after Cogan ran into financial difficulties and the company name was changed from United Automotive to Penske Automotive in 2007.

=== Bankruptcy of Trace International ===
In July 1999, Cogan's holding company, Trace International Holdings filed for bankruptcy protection. Cogan had used Trace International to hold his controlling interests in two publicly listed companies, Foamex International and United Automotive Group. Trace had pledged its stock in the two companies as collateral for certain loans. After declines in the value of Foamex and United Auto Group in 1998 and 1999, Trace became insolvent as the value of its assets fell below the debt it owed. In 2003, Cogan and several directors of Trace would be accused of having drained cash from Trace International. Cogan was found by second circuit court of Delaware not guilty of all charges on June 25, 2005.

Trace was a holding company through which Mr. Cogan held his principal investment assets. It was owned 70% by Mr. Cogan and 30% by three investors who were friends of Mr. Cogan. In 1999, Trace ran into serious financial difficulties because a major bank withdrew a $1 billion commitment to finance a restructuring of Trace and its holdings due to events, which had nothing to do with Trace or Mr. Cogan that led to a serious disruption in US financing markets. These financial difficulties caused Trace to file in 1999 for bankruptcy protection under Chapter 11 of the U.S. Bankruptcy Code. At that time, Trace’s principal assets were shares of Foamex International and United Auto Group, both of which were publicly traded U.S. corporations, and shares of CHF Industries. Eventually, a Trustee was appointed for Trace, and he sued Mr. Cogan and the other former directors of Trace. His theory was that Mr. Cogan had treated Trace as a personal holding company (which it was), and had improperly taken money out of Trace in the form of unduly high salary, salaries to his wife and payments to his daughter, loans to Mr. Cogan, his wife and others that had not been repaid and other expenditures for what the Trustee characterized as primarily personal purposes. Significantly, the other shareholders of Trace did not complain. However, the Trustee said that Trace had been in “the zone of insolvency,” (which Mr. Cogan and the other directors vehemently disputed) and that because of that Mr. Cogan and the Trace Board had owed fiduciary duties to Trace’s creditors. In 2003, the U.S. District Court for the Southern District of New York, in a very lengthy opinion, agreed with most of the Trustee’s contentions. For example, it found that Mr. Cogan had received salary over a six-year period totaling $39.6 million, which it said was $6.9 million more than executives with similar responsibilities would have received at other companies. The court also rejected claims by Mr. Cogan that he was entitled to substantial offsets against his obligation to repay the loans he had received from Trace. In 2005, the decision of the District Court was reversed on appeal on the basis that the judge had improperly failed to submit the case to a jury. However, by then, Mr. Cogan had settled the case as to himself. Putting aside the correctness of the factual determinations made by the District Court, including the hotly disputed question of when Trace had entered the zone of insolvency, in 2007, the Supreme Court of Delaware, the laws of which governed the obligations of the directors of Trace, ruled that the fact that a company may be near insolvency (i.e., in a “zone of insolvency”) does not cause the directors of a Delaware corporation to have obligations to creditors. Therefore, the basic legal premise on which the court found Mr. Cogan and others to be liable to Trace or its trustee (other than with regard to borrowed money, for which Mr. Cogan clearly was liable to Trace) turned out not to exist.

In 2006, Cogan was named to the board of Ener1, a company that manufactures lithium-ion batteries for plug-in hybrid vehicles.

== Other affiliations ==
Cogan has also served as Chairman and Director of Color Tile, Inc., Knoll International and Sheller-Globe Corporation.
