= Cell and molecular biology =

Cell and molecular biology are related fields of biology that are often combined.

- Cell biology
- Molecular biology
- Institute of Molecular and Cell Biology (disambiguation)
- GRE Biochemistry, Cell and Molecular Biology Test
- International Review of Cell and Molecular Biology
- American Journal of Respiratory Cell and Molecular Biology
- Weill Institute for Cell and Molecular Biology
- Max Planck Institute of Molecular Cell Biology and Genetics
- Molecular Biology of the Cell
- Molecular Biology of the Cell (textbook)
- Nature Reviews Molecular Cell Biology
