= Scott D. Emr =

American cell biologist

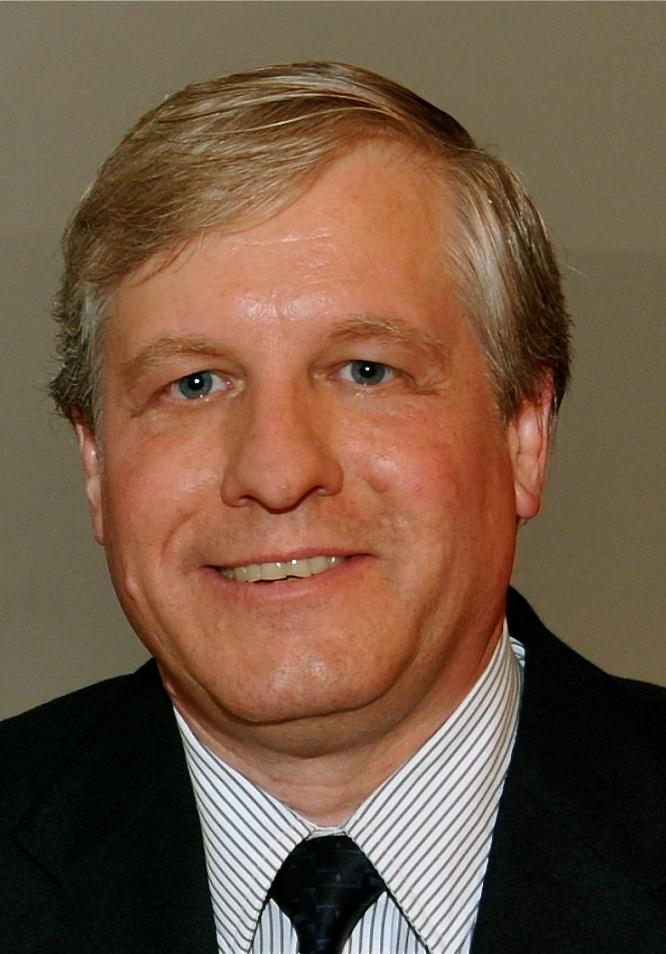
- Born: Scott David Emr; February 8, 1954; Jersey City, New Jersey, United States
- Education: Harvard University; University of Rhode Island
- Known for: Research in membrane vesicle trafficking
- Spouse: Michelle Emr
- Children: 2
- Awards: Louisa Gross Horwitz Prize; Shaw Prize in Life science and Medicine
- Scientific career
- Fields: Cell biology
- Workplaces: Cornell University; University of California, San Diego; Howard Hughes Medical Institute; California Institute of Technology; University of California, Berkeley
- Thesis: Protein localization in Escherichia coli (1981)
- Doctoral advisor: Thomas Silhavy; Jonathan Beckwith

Scott D. Emr (born February 8, 1954) is an American cell biologist and the founding and current Director of the Weill Institute for Cell and Molecular Biology at Cornell University, where he is also a Frank H.T. Rhodes Class of 1956 Professor at the Department of Molecular Biology and Genetics.

== Early life and education ==
Emr was born in Jersey City and grew up in Fort Lee, New Jersey. His father was a manager of a manufacturing company. He has a sister and two brothers.

The 1960s documentary The Undersea World of Jacques Cousteau prompted him to pick a university with a strong oceanography program, starting in 1972 at the University of Rhode Island as a biology major. He became interested in genetics during his undergraduate years. He started his PhD in 1976 at the Department of Microbiology and Molecular Genetics at Harvard University, working under Thomas Silhavy and Jonathan Beckwith and graduating in 1981.

== Career ==
Emr began his career at the University of California, Berkeley as a Miller Institute Fellow and a postdoctoral researcher at Randy Schekman's group. He moved to the California Institute of Technology in 1983, becoming an assistant, and later associate professor, at the Division of Biology.

George Emil Palade recruited Emr to the University of California, San Diego in 1991, where he stayed as a Distinguished Professor at the Department of Cellular and Molecular Medicine and, at the same time, an investigator at the Howard Hughes Medical Institute. He left for Cornell University in 2007 when he was appointed as the founding director of the Institute of Cell and Molecular Biology (later renamed to Weill Institute for Cell and Molecular Biology after a donation from Joan and Sanford I. Weill) and a Frank H.T. Rhodes Class of 1956 Professor at the Department of Molecular Biology and Genetics.

Academically, Emr serves on the editorial boards of several scientific journals, including (as of 2021) mBio, Journal of Cell Biology, Trends in Cell Biology, and Current Opinion in Cell Biology.

== Research ==
Emr's research focuses on the regulation of membrane vesicle trafficking pathways. His lab's study of the ESCRT (endosomal sorting complexes required for transport) complexes earned him a Shaw Prize in Life Science and Medicine. ESCRTs are required for the degradation of membrane protein at the lysosome, a late step in cytokinesis, and the budding and release of human immunodeficiency virus (HIV).

His other research interests include lipid signaling (especially a group of lipids known as phosphatidylinositol phosphates), protein transport in cells by vesicles and the role of arrestin and ubiquitylation in the degradation of membrane proteins.

== Honors and awards ==
- Fellow of the American Society for Microbiology (1998)
- Fellow of the American Association for the Advancement of Science (1999)
- Member of the American Academy of Arts and Sciences (2004)
- Member of the National Academy of Sciences (2007)
- Avanti Award in Lipids, American Society for Biochemistry and Molecular Biology (2007)
- Associate Member of the European Molecular Biology Organization (2008)
- van Deenen Medal, Institute of Biomembranes, Utrecht University (2014)
- Keith R. Porter Lecture, American Society for Cell Biology (2017)
- Fellow of the American Society for Cell Biology (2017)
- Shaw Prize in Life Science and Medicine (2021)
- Louisa Gross Horwitz Prize (2024)

== Personal life ==
Emr met his wife Michelle in his junior year at university. She was also in her third year, majoring in music and early education. They married three years later when Emr was pursuing his PhD. As of 2021, their daughter Bryanna is a pediatric surgeon in Pittsburgh, and their son Kevin is an anesthesiologist in Albany, New York.
