= SynBio =

- Industry: Biotech Research and Pharmaceuticals
- Founded: August 2011
- Headquarters: Moscow, Russia
- Owner: Rusnano, HSCI, FDS Pharma, Dmitry Genkin, Cryonix, and Pharmsynthez
- Website: www.synbio-pharma.com

SynBio is a long-term project started in 2011 with the goal of creating innovative medicines, including what are known as Biobetters. This project is a collaborative effort of several Russian and international pharmaceutical companies. The largest private participant of SynBio is the Human Stem Cells Institute (HSCI), a leading Russian biotech company, and Rusnano is a key investor. The project is a significant example of international cooperation between researchers in Russia, England, and Germany. Special project company SynBio LLC is headquartered in Moscow.

Currently, SynBio LLC is developing nine drugs based on three biotechnology platforms (Histone, PolyXen and Gemacell) for the treatment of liver disease, cardiovascular disease, acute leukemia, growth hormone deficiency and diabetes mellitus.

The SynBio project also entails the creation of modern production facilities. These facilities will be dedicated to the manufacturing of the company's pharmaceutical substances and market-ready medicines once they have successfully undergone clinical testing.

== Research and Development Centers ==
- Xenetic Biosciences (London, Great Britain) is a leading biopharmaceutical company operating from the UK that develops high-value, differentiated pharmaceutical products in the fields of protein drugs, vaccines and anti-cancer drugs.
- SymBioTec GmbH (Saarbrücken, Germany) is a company working to develop next generation medicines for the treatment of cancer and infectious diseases. SymBioTec has a state-of-the-art biotech laboratory equipped for proteomics, cell and molecular biology as well as biotechnology.
- HSCI (Moscow, Russia) is one of the leading biotech companies of Russia that is engaged in development of cell- and gene-based technologies with promising medical applications.
