= Sytner Group =

Car dealerships company in England

Sytner Group Ltd
- Company type: Subsidiary
- Industry: Automotive retail
- Founded: 1968
- Founder: Alan & Frank Sytner
- Headquarters: Leicester, England
- Number of locations: 140+
- Area served: United Kingdom
- Key people: Gerard Nieuwenhuys (Group Chairman); John Cragg (CEO)
- Brands: Various automotive brands via retail, including Audi, Bentley & Porsche
- Revenue: £5.95 billion (2018)
- Operating income: £113.3 million (2018)
- Parent: Penske Automotive Group
- Website: Sytner.co.uk

The Sytner Group Ltd is a car dealership company headquartered in Leicester, United Kingdom.

The group holds dealerships located in England, Scotland, Wales and Northern Ireland and specialises in premium and specialist franchises from Audi to Porsche. The group is wholly owned by the United States–based Penske Automotive Group, a NYSE listed part owned division of Penske Corporation.

== History ==
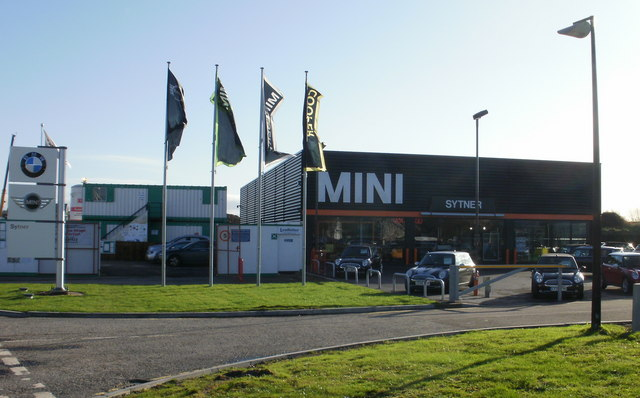
Sytner Mini, one of two Sytner-operated dealerships on Usk Way in Newport, South Wales. November 2009

The group was formed by Frank Sytner and his brother Alan, the owner of the famous Liverpool-based Cavern Club. The brothers founded their first retail franchise in Nottingham in 1968, selling BMWs.

After Frank finished his racing career, during which he won the 1988 British Touring Car Championship title, the group began a rapid period of expansion by acquisition of BMW franchises in Leicester and Sheffield. From 1995, other marques were added with the acquisition of Mercedes-Benz, Ferrari and Audi franchises in Bristol, Loughborough and Leeds. In 1996 the group opened Land Rover, Jeep and Porsche dealerships in Stockport and Reading. The group floated on the London Stock Exchange in 1997, as the Sytner Group PLC.

In 1998 the group acquired the family-run Thames Ditton–based Land Rover and Jaguar Cars business of Guy Salmon, which then became the name of all Sytner-owned Land Rover and Jaguar franchises. The acquisition of the Ixion Motor Group in August 1999 doubled the number of locations, and brought in the Volvo, Saab and Lexus brands to the group. The 2001 acquisition of the Ron Stratton Group brought the Bentley brand into the group with a Manchester franchise.

On 12 February 2002, Sytner Group was itself acquired by American-based motor retailer United Auto Group (UAG) in a $135 million deal. The group was delisted from the London Stock Exchange, while the majority of the Sytner management team remained unchanged.

The group expanded further into South Wales with the purchase of family owned Mercedes dealerships, together with two from rival Pendragon Group in Bedford and Northampton. In 2004 the group acquired Audi dealerships Aston Green Ltd and Glenvarigill Ltd, moving the group into Scotland.

In 2005 the head office was moved to a new location in Leicester, located just off junction 21 of the M1 Motorway. The purchase of William Jack's PLC expanded the groups franchises to include Honda. In 2006 the group completed the development of a Bentley, Lexus and Lamborghini dealership at Fort Dunlop, Birmingham.

In February 2013, the group reported record revenues of £3Bn, after the purchase major Northern Ireland motor retailer Isaac Agnew.

July 2016 saw the Group acquire a further 11 dealerships, this time from CJ Automotive. Situated across the North-West, the acquisition saw not only a number of new Volkswagen and SEAT dealerships join the group but also the addition of Sytner Group's first SKODA dealership.

In January 2017, Sytner Group became the UK's biggest Dealer Group after acquiring CarShop for £71.8 million. The move saw the Group's estimated turnover for 2017 grow to £5.3 billion.

Sytner Group continued its growth in 2017 with acquisition of Trainer BMW and MINI in Swansea. Celebrating 40 years of business in 2016, all 100 Trainer staff members transferred to Sytner Group within the move. The acquisition saw Sytner Group's total count of BMW and MINI dealerships rise to 17 for each brand.

In January 2018 Sytner acquired the Car People for an estimated £81 million and has created used car supermarket division by merging CarShop and The Car People. The used car division would sell 55,000 vehicles per annum and would generate £500m annual turnover.

== Awards ==
In 2018, Sytner Group were named by Glassdoor as the 14th best company to work in the UK; not only the highest ranked business in the Automotive Sector, Sytner were the top rated retailer ahead of other large national businesses like Apple and IKEA. The survey is based on direct colleague feedback via the Glassdoor website where Sytner have a 4.4 star overall rating, with 87% saying they would recommend a friend and 100% approving of the Company’s Chief Executive, Darren Edwards.

== See also ==
- Penske Automotive Group
- Penske Corporation
