= Indian Queen =

Irish-bred Thoroughbred racehorse

- Sire: Electric
- Grandsire: Blakeney
- Dam: Taj Princess
- Damsire: Taj Dewan
- Sex: Mare
- Foaled: 25 February 1985
- Country: United Kingdom
- Colour: Chestnut
- Breeder: Sir Gordon Brunton
- Owner: Sir Gordon Brunton
- Trainer: Lord Huntingdon
- Record: 25: 9-2-3
- Earnings: £257,502

Major wins
- Premio Legnano (1989); Blandford Stakes (1989); Prix Royal-Oak (1990); Ascot Gold Cup (1991)

Indian Queen (25 February 1985 – July 2000) was a British thoroughbred racehorse best known for winning the Ascot Gold Cup on her final racecourse appearance.

== Background ==
Indian Queen was a chestnut mare bred by her owner Sir Gordon Brunton at the North Munstead Stud. She was sired by Electric out of Taj Princess (Taj Dewan). She was trained by the then Royal trainer William Hastings-Bass, 17th Earl of Huntingdon, at West Ilsley in Berkshire.

Indian Queen died at age 15 after an accident in the paddocks at North Munstead Stud at Godalming, Surrey, in July 2000. She was two weeks in foal to Hector Protector when she died.

== Racing career ==
Indian Queen earned a reputation for winning over long distances. She began her career in France and won a victory at Cagnes-sur-Mer. She was the winner of a number of Group class races including a dead heat with Braashee in the Prix Royal-Oak at Longchamp in 1990, and gained outright victory, as a rank outsider at 25–1, in the 1991 Ascot Gold Cup whilst in foal to Night Shift. On both occasions she was ridden by Walter Swinburn. She beat Arzanni ridden by Frankie Dettori in a thrilling finish to claim her Gold Cup triumph.

== Stud record ==
Indian Queen was retired following her Gold Cup win. Then she served as broodmare. Her daughter, Royal Patron, won several races.
