= Big bath =

Misleading accounting technique

In accounting, big bath is an earnings management technique whereby a one-time charge is taken against income in order to reduce assets, which results in lower expenses in the future. The write-off removes or reduces the asset from the financial books and results in lower net income for that year. The objective is to 'take one big bath' in a single year so future years will show increased net income.

This technique is often employed in a year when sales are down from other external factors and the company would report a loss in any event. For example, inventory valued on the books at $100 per item is written down to $50 per item resulting in a net loss of $50 per item in the current year. Note there is no cash impact to this write-down. When that same inventory is sold in later years for $75 per item, the company reports an income of $25 per item in the future period. This process takes an inventory loss and turns it into a 'profit'. Corporations will often wait until a bad year to employ this 'big bath' technique to 'clean up' the balance sheet.

Although the process is discouraged by auditors, it is still used. In recent times, General Motors and other US corporations have taken huge write downs on balance sheet assets resulting in massive losses. The same result can be achieved by recording in one year the future cash costs of expected plant closing or employee layoffs. The objective is to take these losses all at once, so future periods can show positive net income.

== Incentives ==
The incentives behind this earnings management technique varies. A widespread belief of why companies utilize this technique is to improve external reputation and appeal to investors and creditors. In most large corporations, managers are in charge of financial reporting. This gives managers the incentive of bias reporting to increase the reputation of their company and to attribute those gains to their own ability. Other possible reasons why some managers have the incentive to tamper with their company financial reporting is for higher salary and recognition of their abilities to increase profit. It is often believed that earning management activities are common before and after management changes. Thus, other incentives may possibly be led by management turnovers.

== Earnings Management ==
Often time managers use reporting strategies regardless if the external users are naive and ignore management's ability to manipulate earnings or if users are sophisticated and can accurately deduce the management's disclosure strategy. When times are bad for the corporations financially, as a financial reporting strategy, managers will under-report earnings by the maximum they can in the current period, in order to report higher future earnings. On the other hand, in both academic and business press, earnings management has negative connotations because it suggests the tampering of earnings by management at the disadvantage of investors and other external users. Furthermore, biased financial reporting goes against GAAP regulations.

=== Accounting Standards ===
One source finds that aside from manager's and auditor's incentives, accounting standards has a huge impact on earnings management behavior. Moreover, some have argued that the market rewards management for smoother earnings as well. International Financial Reporting Standards (IFRS) restrict revised earning reports of companies who rely on big bath provisions to maintain their increase in income, even if they are only gaining a very minimal amount of earnings. IFRS is a global set of accounting standards that require companies to report accurate annual earnings. The standards are an accurate measurement of earnings because there is only a single standard rather than multiple standards that could present opportunity to big bath strategies.

== Applications ==
In 2016, Samsung reported to have battery issues in the newest Note 7 release. The defective batteries accrued substantial financial costs of approximately three billion dollars from Samsung's reported four billion dollars of net profit. Some predict Samsung will implement the big bath technique to have a lower net income in 2016, then will increase in the following years. The big bath technique will allow Samsung to wash away bad debts.

In a 2014 Wall Street Journal article, emerging banking CEOs are most likely to take big baths to increase banking performance and net profits in the following years. New CEOs attribute decrease in income in the first year to former CEOs. Initial artificial decrease in net income provides the illusion of an increased income in the next year.
