= Weill Institute for Cell and Molecular Biology =

Non-profit research institution in Ithaca, New York, U.S.

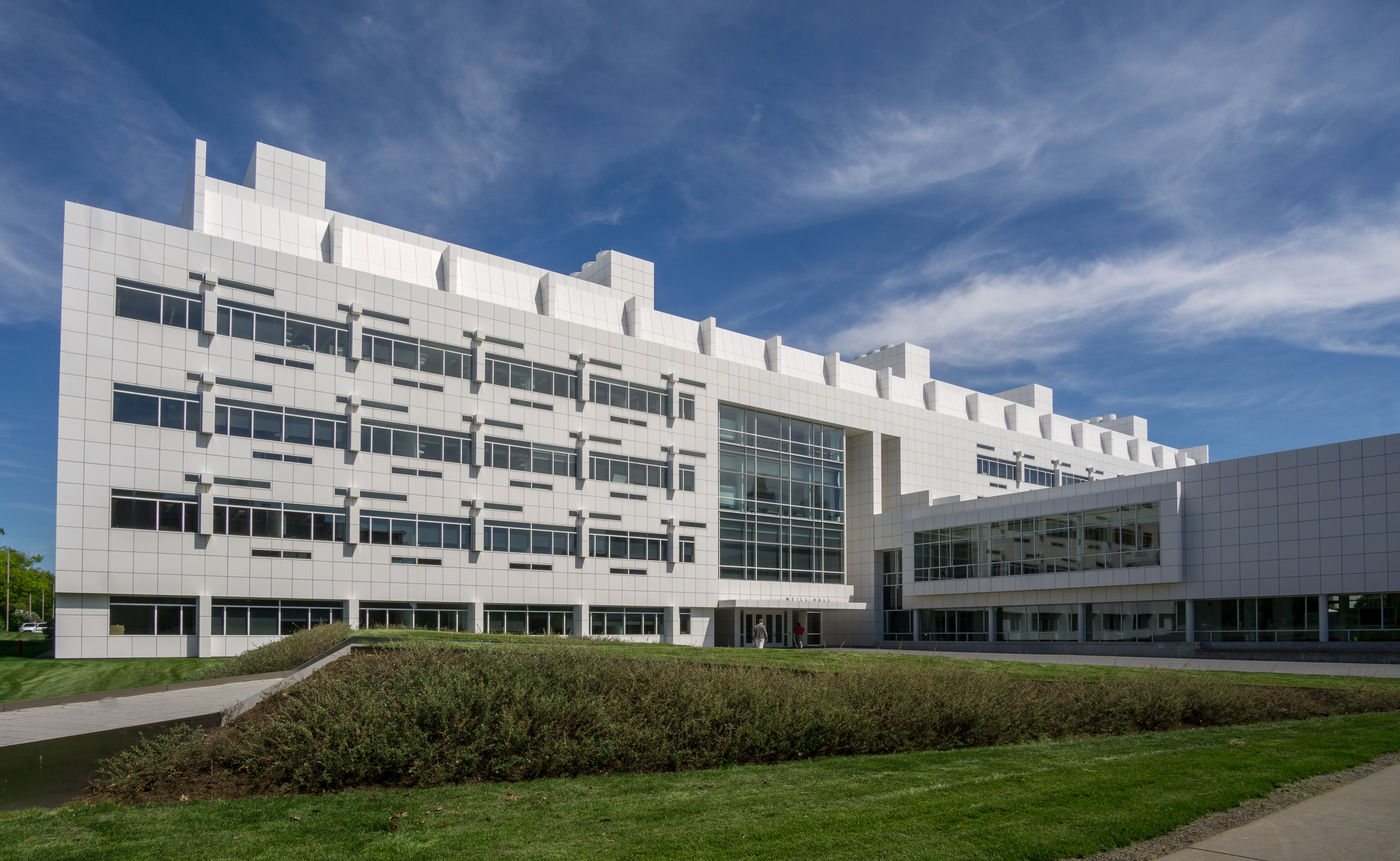
Weill Hall at Cornell University, designed by Richard Meier

Founded in 2007, the Joan and Sanford I. Weill Institute for Cell and Molecular Biology is a collaborative, non-profit research institution located on Cornell University's campus in Ithaca, New York. The Weill Institute consists of twelve faculty-led teams, appointed in several life sciences departments within Cornell University. The "cornerstone" of the University's $650 million New Life Sciences Initiative, the Institute is intended to foster multidisciplinary, collaborative research efforts toward answering fundamental questions in cell and molecular biology.

== Background ==
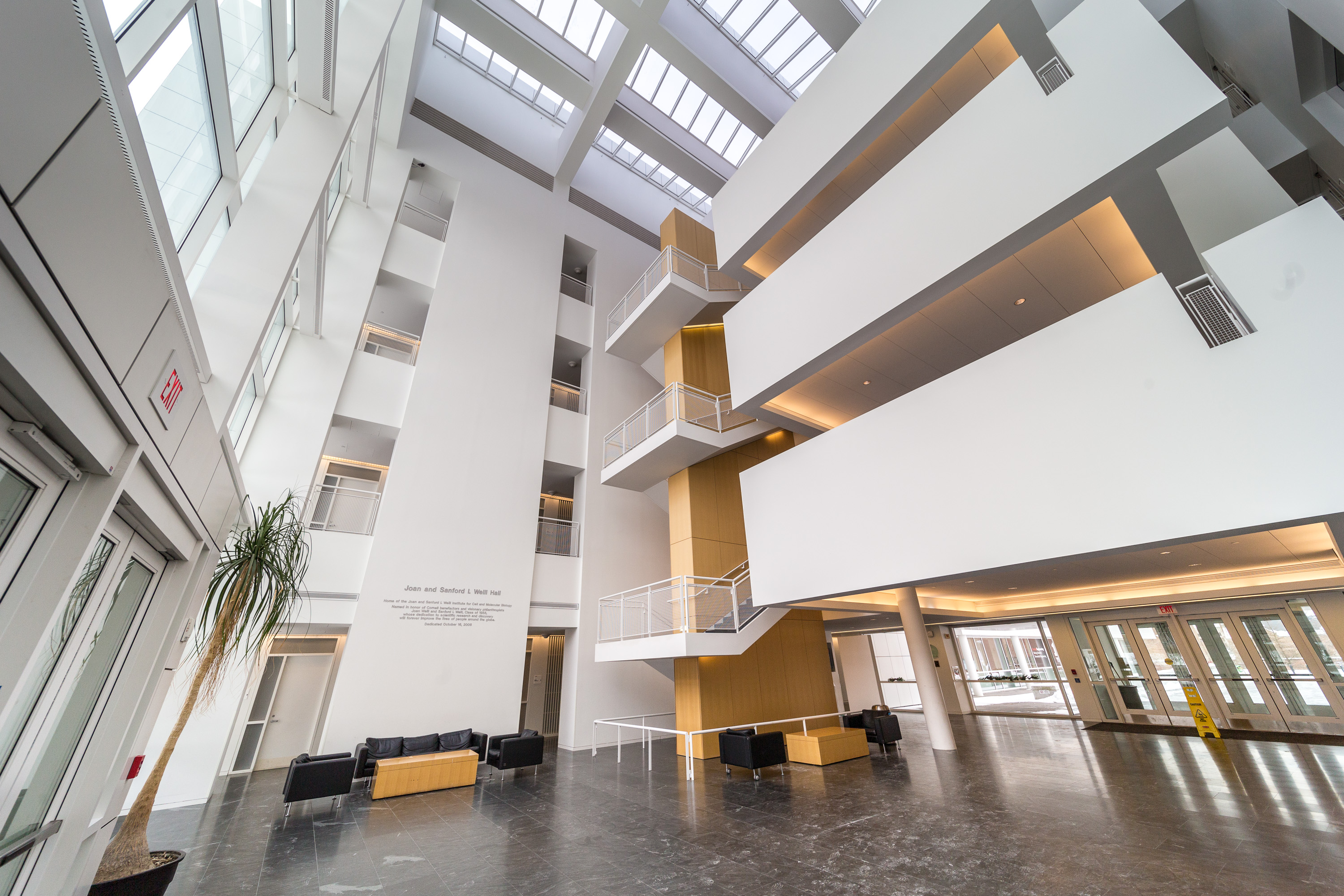
Weill Hall interior

=== Weill Hall ===
The Weill Institute occupies three floors in the south wing of Weill Hall, a $162 million, 263,000-square-foot (24,400 m^{2}) research facility on Cornell University's Ithaca campus. Weill Hall was designed by world-renowned architect and Cornell alumnus Richard Meier. Cornell and the Weill Institute celebrated the building's dedication on October 16, 2008.

=== Leadership ===
In May 2006, Scott D. Emr was named the Frank H.T. Rhodes Class of '56 Director of the Weill Institute for Cell and Molecular Biology.

Emr is perhaps best known for his identification of the ESCRT (endosomal sorting complex required for transport) protein machinery. This set of protein complexes is critical for down-regulating activated cell surface receptors. It has also been found to play a vital role in cell division and the viral budding of HIV. His work on the ESCRT complexes has led to his election into both the American Academy of Arts and Sciences in 2004 and the United States National Academy of Sciences in 2007.

Anthony Bretscher was appointed in 2007 as Associate Director of the Weill Institute. His research focuses on microfilaments and cell polarity.
