= Sanford I. Weill =

American banker and philanthropist (born 1933)

Sandy Weill
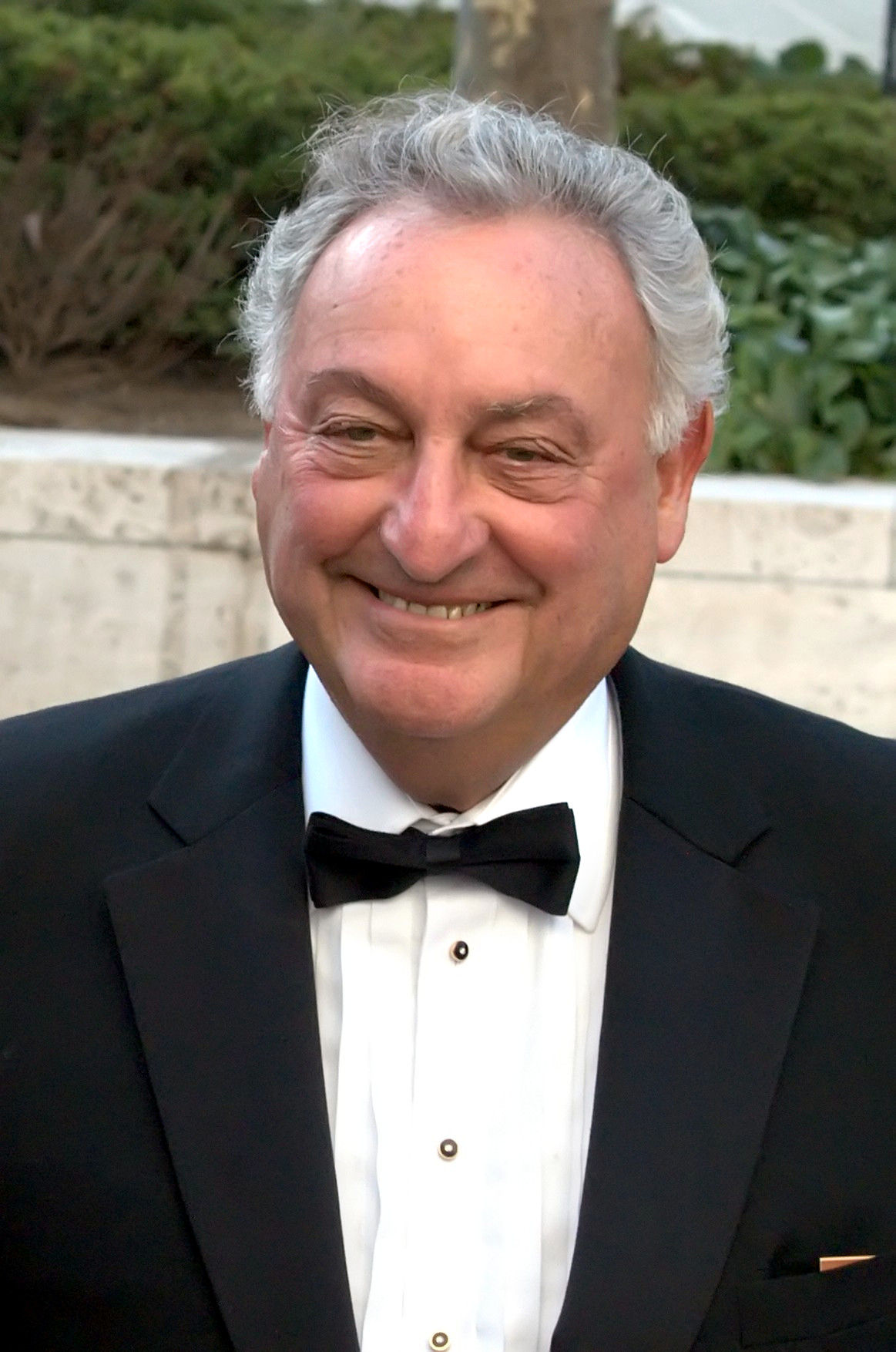
- Weill in 2009
- Born: Sanford I. Weill; March 16, 1933 (age 93); New York City, U.S.
- Education: Cornell University (BA)
- Occupations: Banker, financier

Sanford I. "Sandy" Weill (/waɪl/; born March 16, 1933) is an American banker, financier, and philanthropist. He is a former chief executive and chairman of Citigroup, from 1998 to October 2003, and April 2006, respectively.

== Early life and education ==
Weill was born in the Bensonhurst section of Brooklyn, New York City, to Polish Jewish immigrants, Etta (Kalika) and Max Weill. He attended P.S. 200 of the New York City Public Schools system for elementary school in his local neighborhood of Bensonhurst. He also attended Peekskill Military Academy in Peekskill, New York of Upstate New York, and then enrolled at Cornell University in Ithaca, New York, where he was active in the U.S. Air Force ROTC and Alpha Epsilon Pi fraternity. In 1955, Weill graduated with a Bachelor of Arts degree in government from Cornell.

Weill's middle initial of "I" is not an abbreviation for anything. In 2002, he said:

My mother wanted to name me after somebody whose name started with an "I", but she couldn't think of a name she liked. So she gave me the initial with the idea that after I was 21 I could choose whatever middle name I wanted.

== Career ==
In 1955, shortly after graduating from Cornell, Weill began his first job on Wall Street, as a runner for Bear Stearns. In 1956, he became a licensed broker at Bear Stearns. Rather than making phone calls or personal visits to solicit clients, Weill found he was far more comfortable sitting at his desk, poring through companies' financial statements and disclosures made to the U.S. Securities and Exchange Commission. For weeks his only client was his mother, Etta, until his later to be wife, Joan, persuaded an ex-boyfriend to open a brokerage account.

=== Building Shearson ===
While working at Bear Stearns, Weill was a neighbor of Arthur L. Carter who was working at Lehman Brothers. Together with Roger Berlind and Peter Potoma, they formed Carter, Berlind, Potoma & Weill in May 1960. In 1962 the firm became Carter, Berlind & Weill after the New York Stock Exchange brought disciplinary proceedings against Potoma.

In 1968, with the departure of Arthur Carter, the firm was renamed Cogan, Berlind, Weill & Levitt (Marshall Cogan, Arthur Levitt), or CBWL jokingly referred to on Wall Street as "Corned Beef With Lettuce". Weill was the firm's chairman from 1965 to 1984, a period in which it completed over 15 acquisitions to become the country's second-largest securities brokerage firm. The company became CBWL-Hayden, Stone, Inc. in 1970; Hayden Stone, Inc. in 1972; Shearson Hayden Stone in 1974, when it merged with Shearson Hammill & Co.; and Shearson Loeb Rhoades in 1979, when it merged with Loeb, Rhoades, Hornblower & Co.

With capital totaling $250 million, Shearson Loeb Rhoades trailed only Merrill Lynch as the largest securities broker.

=== American Express ===
In 1981, Weill sold Shearson Loeb Rhoades to American Express for about $915 million in stock. In 1982, he founded the National Academy Foundation with the Academy of Finance to educate high school students. Weill began as president of American Express Co. in 1983 and as chairman and CEO of American Express's insurance subsidiary, Fireman's Fund Insurance Company, in 1984. Weill was succeeded by his protégé, Peter A. Cohen, who became the youngest head of a Wall Street firm. While at American Express, Weill began grooming his newest protégé, Jamie Dimon, the future CEO of JPMorgan Chase.

=== Acquisitions ===
Weill resigned from American Express in August 1985 at age 52. After an attempt to become the CEO of BankAmerica Corp., he persuaded Minneapolis-based Control Data Corporation to spin off a troubled subsidiary, Commercial Credit, a consumer finance company. In 1986, Weill bought Commercial Credit for $7 million. After a period of layoffs and reorganization, the company completed a successful IPO.

In 1987, he acquired Gulf Insurance. The following year, in 1988, he paid $1.5 billion for Primerica, the parent company of Smith Barney and the A. L. Williams insurance company. In 1989, he acquired Drexel Burnham Lambert's retail brokerage outlets. In 1992, he paid $722 million to buy a 27% share of Travelers Insurance, which had gotten into trouble because of bad real estate investments.

In 1993, he reacquired his old Shearson brokerage (now Shearson Lehman) from American Express for $1.2 billion. By the end of the year, he had completely taken over Travelers Corp in a $4 billion stock deal and officially began calling his corporation Travelers Group Inc. In 1996 he added to his holdings, at a cost of $4 billion, the property and casualty operations of Aetna Life & Casualty. In September 1997 Weill acquired Salomon Inc., the parent company of Salomon Brothers Inc. for over $9 billion in stock.

=== Citigroup ===
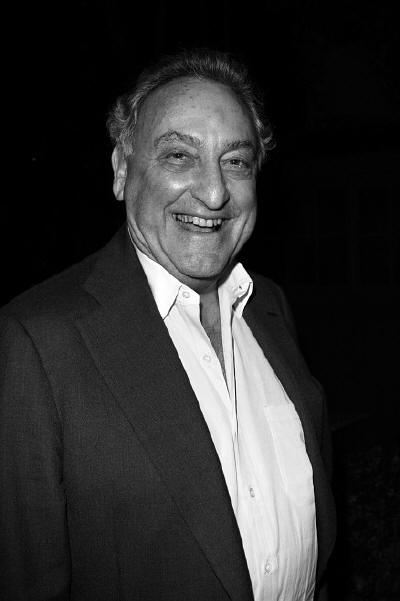
Sanford I. ("Sandy") Weill, at age 74, after retirement as C.E.O. of Citigroup in New York City in 2007

In April 1998, Travelers Group announced an agreement to undertake the $76 billion merger between Travelers and Citicorp, and the merger was completed on October 8, 1998. The possibility remained that the merger would run into problems connected with federal law. Ever since the passage of the Glass–Steagall Act of 1932, during the presidential administration, of 31st President, Herbert Hoover (1874–1964, served 1929–1933), the fields of banking and insurance businesses had been kept separate. Both Weill and CEO / chairman predecessor John S. Reed (born 1939), bet that the U.S. Congress in Washington, D.C. would soon pass legislation overturning those regulations, which Weill, Reed and a number of businesspeople considered not in their interest.

To speed up the process, they recruited to the board of directors of the financial company former 38th President, Gerald R. Ford (1913–2006, served 1974–1977, a Republican) and former U.S. Treasury Secretary Robert Rubin (born 1938, who served during the Democratic Bill Clinton presidential administration, 1993–2001) whom Weill was personally close to. With both Democrats and Republicans on their side, the law was taken down in less than two years. Many European countries, for instance, had already torn down the firewall between banking and insurance. During a two-to-five-year grace period allowed by law, Citigroup could conduct business in its merged form; should that period have elapsed without a change in the law, Citigroup would have had to spin off its insurance businesses. Weill's office holds a wood etching of him engraved with the words "The Shatterer of Glass–Steagall". Weill now denies that the congressional repeal of the 1932 Glass–Steagall Act played a role in the 2008 financial crisis and subsequent Great Recession, the worst economic downturn and financial collapse in American history since the infamous Great Depression of the 1930s.

In 1998, Weill was the recipient of FinancialWorld Magazine's CEO of the Year Award and received the same honor from ChiefExecutive Magazine in 2002.

In 2001, Weill became a Class A director of the Federal Reserve Bank of New York of the United States Federal Reserve system. Class A directors are those elected by the Federal Reserve member regional banks. Also in 2001, Weill established several offshore enterprises, including one through which he owned his yacht. These entities were identified in the infamous Panama Papers scandal, a release in 2016 of secret financial documents dating back to the 1970s, of off-shore overseas / foreign money deposits and secret bank accounts of millions of dollars of wealthy Americans and others hiding them for federal / state income tax purposes.

In 2002, the financial company was hit by the wave of Wall Street managerial restructuring that followed the earlier stock market downturn of 2002. The following year of 2003, Weill sold 5.6 million shares of Citigroup stock back to the financial institution itself for nearly $264 million and semi-retired, relinquishing the title of chief executive officer (CEO) to Charles O. ("Chuck") Prince (born 1950), who however only served for the next few years, stepping down himself as both CEO and one year as chairman in 2007). But Weill remained chairman of the board of directors of Citigroup in 2002 until four years later in 2006.

Four years after the beginning of the shocking economic panic and financial collapse of the Great Recession of 2007–2011, on July 25, 2012, Weill reversed course on the financial supermarket, and was quoted saying: "What we should probably do is go and split up investment banking from banking, have banks be deposit takers, have banks make commercial loans and real estate loans, have banks do something that's not going to risk the taxpayer dollars, that's not too big to fail," Weill said on CNBC (the business / financial news cable television network): "If they want to hedge what they're doing with their investments, let them do it in a way that's going to be mark-to-market so they're never going to be hit."

== Personal life ==
Weill married Joan H. Mosher on June 20, 1955. The couple now live on a 362 acres estate they purchased in 2010 in Sonoma, California.

He has two children. Jessica Bibliowicz worked in financial services under her father at firms such as Smith Barney and was CEO of National Financial Partners until its eventual acquisition. Marc Weill also worked in financial services companies run by his father, at one point as the CEO of Citigroup Investments until resigning in 2000 and becoming involved in venture capital.

== Philanthropy ==
Weill and Cornell

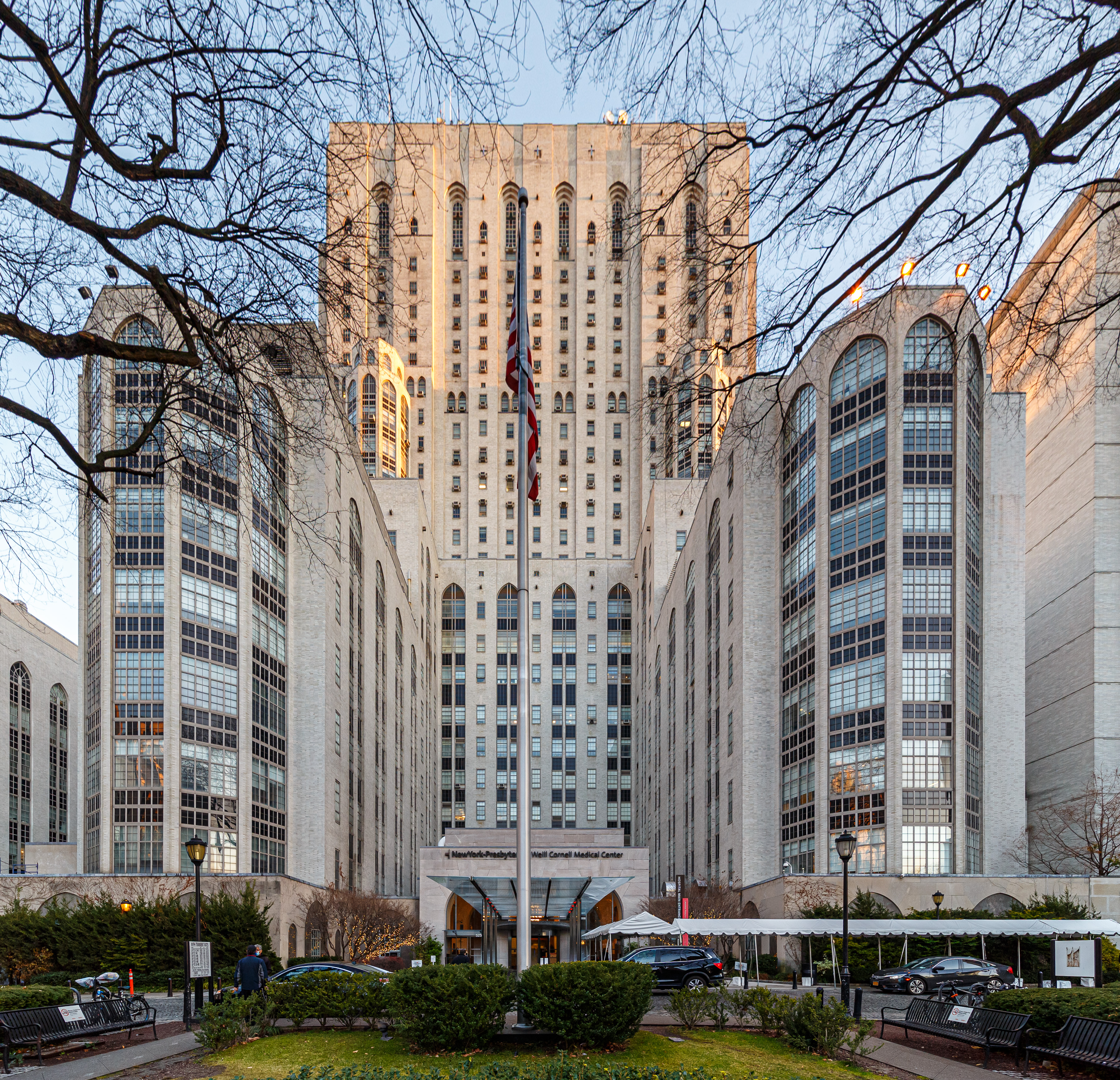
New York-Presbyterian/Weill Cornell Medical Center (68th Street, Manhattan)

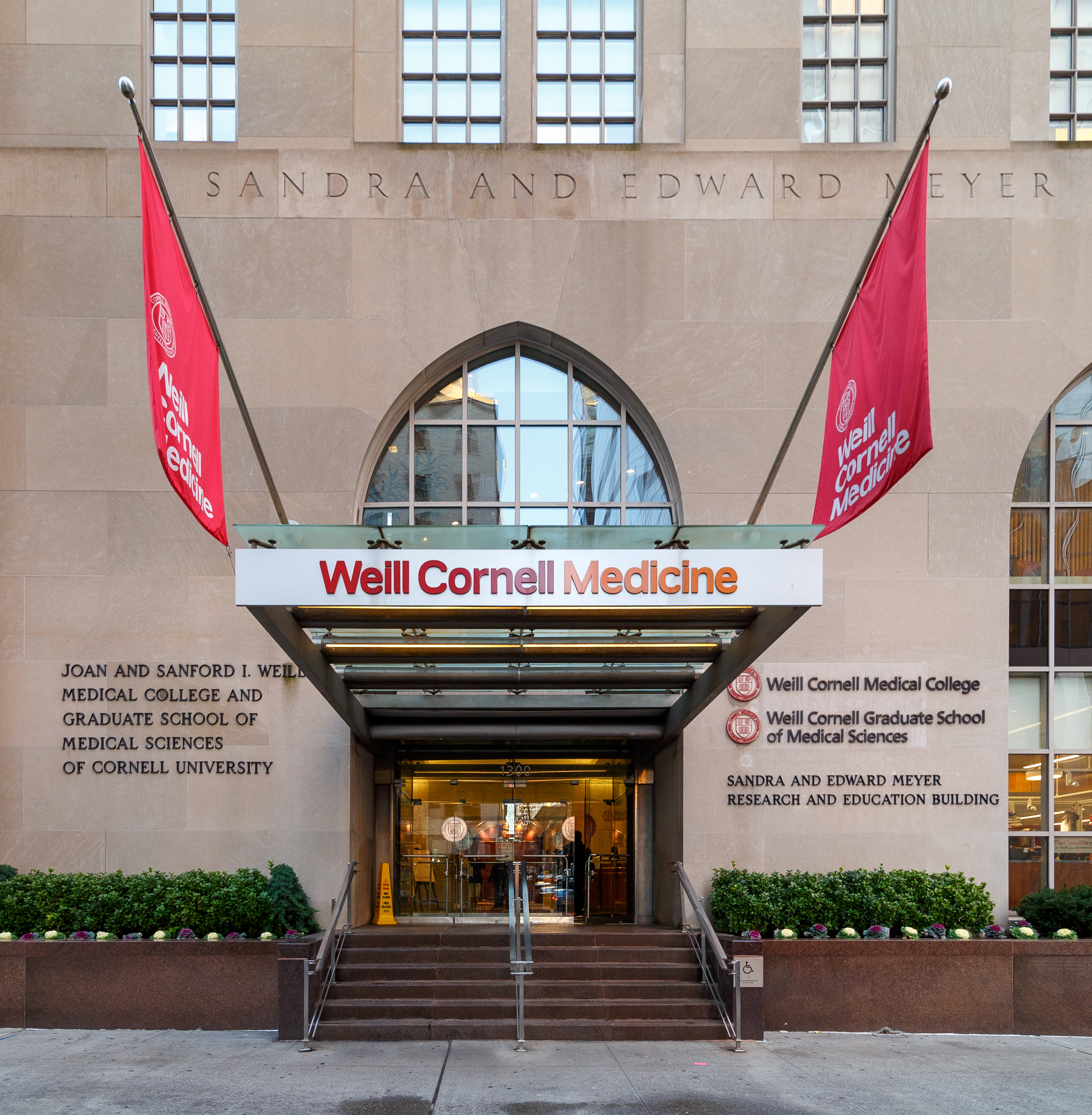
Weill Cornell Medicine (York Avenue, Manhattan)

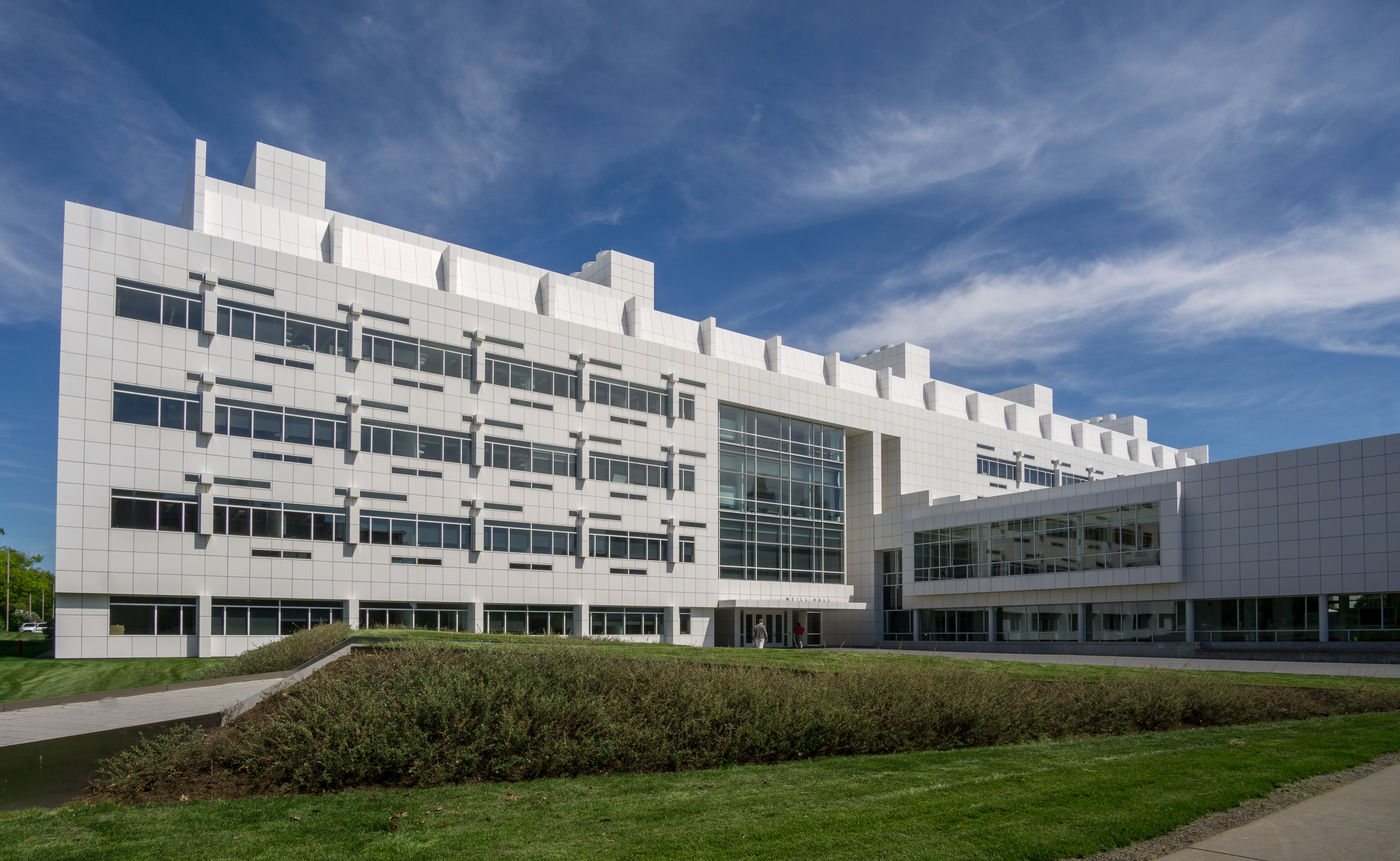
Weill Institute for Cell and Molecular Biology (Cornell's Ithaca campus)

In 1997, Weill received the Golden Plate Award of the American Academy of Achievement. His Golden Plate was presented by Awards Council member, retired U.S. Army General and former Chairman of the Joint Chiefs of Staff and also later U.S. Secretary of State, Colin Powell (1937–2021).

Weill was a Cornell Trustee, his alma mater. In 1998, he endowed Cornell's medical school, now known as Weill Cornell Medicine, located on the Upper East Side of Manhattan in New York City (separate from Cornel's main campus in Ithaca). As chairman of the Board of Overseers of the Weill Cornell Medical College and an emeritus member of the Board of Trustees of Cornell University itself, Weill orchestrated a $400 million donation to Cornell, to which he and his wife personally contributed $250 million.

In June 2007, he endowed the Weill Institute for Cell and Molecular Biology at his alma mater of Cornell University, on its campus in Ithaca, New York, housed in a new life science building named Weill Hall. On September 10, 2013, Joan and Sandy Weill and the Weill Family Foundation announced a $100 million gift to Weill Cornell. Weill is chairman of the Board of Overseers of Weill Cornell Medical College and the parallel Weill Cornell Graduate School of Medical Sciences, having joined the board in 1982 and becoming its chair in 1995. Weill stepped down as chairman of the Board of Overseers in 2014, and was succeeded by his daughter, Jessica M. Bibliowicz. Weill Cornell established the first American medical school overseas in Doha, the modernist capital city of the emirate State of Qatar in the Middle East / Persian Gulf region, in 2001. This was made possible through a special partnership between Weill Cornell and the Qatar Foundation for Education, Science and Community Development. Weill Cornell's inaugural class in Qatar graduated in 2008.

Weill also is on the Board of Governors of Sidra. a 380-bed specialty teaching hospital was scheduled to open in 2014, also in the emirate State of Qatar in the Middle East / Persian Gulf. Sidra is supported by a $9 billion endowment from the Qatar Foundation. In addition, he is a Trustee of New York-Presbyterian Hospital; a Trustee of the Hospital for Special Surgery; and a member of the Executive Council of the University of California at San Francisco Medical Center.

In May 2003, he received the Baruch Medal for Business and Civic Leadership, presented by Baruch College of the City University of New York system for his work in public education and his accomplishments in business.

A proponent of education, Weill instituted a joint program with the New York City Board of Education in 1980 that created the specialized magnet school of the Academy of Finance, which trains high school students for careers in financial services. He is Founder and Chairman of the National Academy Foundation (NAF), which oversees more than 100,000 students in 617 career-themed academies of finance, hospitality and tourism, information technology, engineering, and health sciences, in 35 states, as well as the District of Columbia (Washington, D.C.) and the U.S. Virgin Islands (in the Caribbean Sea / West Indies islands). Ninety-nine percent of NAF's students graduate, with eighty-seven percent going on to post-secondary education – often as the first in their families to attend college. Former New York Governor Andrew Cuomo (born 1957, served 2011–2021), appointed Weill as a member of his New York Education Reform Commission.

Weill has received honorary degrees from Howard University in Washington, D.C., Hofstra University in Hempstead, New York on Long Island, the University of New Haven in New Haven, Connecticut, The New School in New York City, and the Sonoma State University in Sonoma, California.

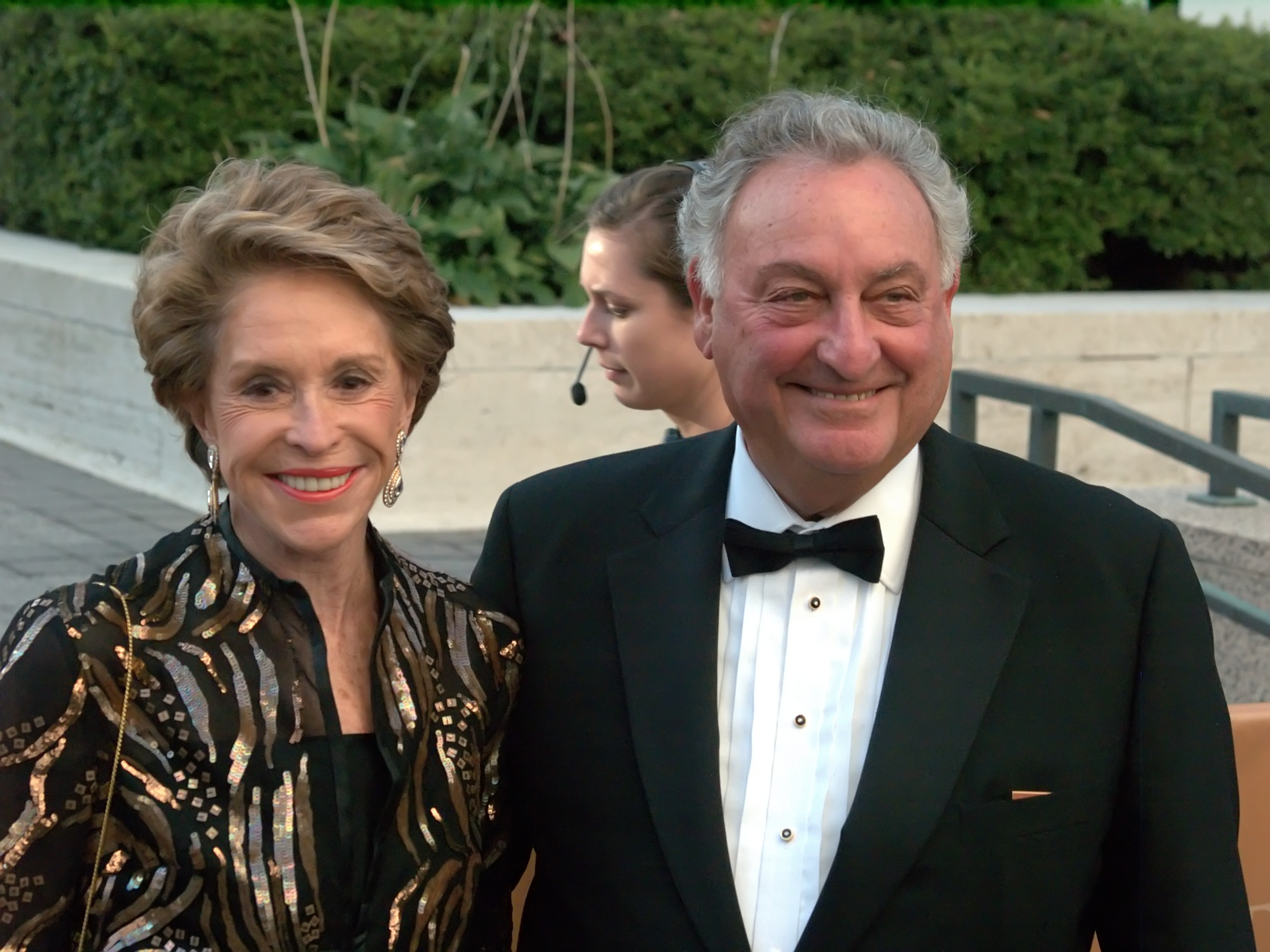
wife Joan H. Mosher Weill and Sanford I. ("Sandy") Weill at age 76 at the opening night of the Metropolitan Opera's Tosca in New York City in 2009

He was the chairman of the Board of the 19th century concert hall / auditorium of Carnegie Hall, built 1891 on Seventh Avenue (between 56th and 57th Streets, in Manhattan), of New York City, until 2016, and both he and his wife Joan are avid champions and lovers of classical music, frequently attending various concerts across the country. Since 1986, one of the three performance halls in landmark Carnegie Hall has been named after Weill and his wife, Joan and Sanford I. Weill Recital Hall. The 1997 recipient of the New York State Governor's Art Award, Weill has been chairman of the Board of Trustees of Carnegie Hall since 1991. For Weill's 70th birthday, Carnegie Hall raised a record $60 million in one evening event through a generous $30 million match by Weill and his wife for the Weill Music Institute, which established broad-reaching music education programs. Weill is also chairman of the Green Music Center Board of Advisors at the Sonoma State University in California and a director of the Lang Lang International Music Foundation.

In September 2006, Joan and Sanford Weill Hall was dedicated at the University of Michigan at Ann Arbor, Michigan. The building is home to the Gerald R. Ford School of Public Policy, named for Gerald R. Ford (1913–2006, served 1974–1977), as the 38th President of the United States, at President Ford's alma mater and shortly after his death. Weill donated $5 million towards the construction of the Ford Public Policy School building and an additional $3 million to endow the position of the academic dean of the U.M. Ford School.

Joan and Sanford Weill have been co-chairs, of the annual "Louis Marshall Award Dinner", from 2000 to 2010.

In 2002, the Joan Weill Adirondack Library and Joan Weill Student Center were dedicated at the Paul Smith's College in the small hamlet / village of Paul Smiths, New York, (near the larger town of Brighton in Franklin County of the Adirondacks Mountains region of northern Upstate New York), where she was a trustee.

The Weills are recipients of the 2009 Carnegie Medal of Philanthropy Award. Sanford I. Weill was the 2015 recipient of the Carnegie Hall Medal of Excellence.

In 2010, the Weills bought a 362-acre estate in Sonoma County, California. In March 2011, the Weills announced a $12 million gift to nearby Sonoma State University, providing the funds to complete the Donald and Maureen Green Music Center concert hall for a fall 2012 opening. The facility, inspired / influenced by the previous similar designed Seiji Ozawa Hall at Tanglewood, the famous music venue and music festival performance center (and the summer home of the Boston Symphony Orchestra since 1937), near the towns of Lenox / Stockbridge of Berkshire County in the Berkshire Hills of Western Massachusetts. The matching Green Music Center pavilion in California has been named the Joan and Sanford I. Weill Hall. "We love to be involved in the communities where we spend time," Sandy Weill commented to an interviewer.

In 2011, Rambam Medical Center in Haifa on the Mediterranean Sea northern coast of the State of Israel and its supporting organization of the American Friends of the Rambam Medical Center announced that Joan and Sandy Weill and the Weill Family Foundation made a donation of $10 million. In addition, the money was intended to support the Israeli-Palestinian Friendship Center and enable the hospital to better serve patients from the Palestinian / Arab-populated areas of the Gaza Strip and the West Bank by making residential hostel facilities available to their families while providing advanced medical training to Palestinian residents, fellows, and nursing staff.

In 2012, Weill was elected a member of the American Academy of Arts and Sciences, among other prominent Americans.

In September 2013, Weill and his wife wrote an op-ed article for the CNBC business / financial news cable television network, stating that philanthropy goes beyond just money. "For us, philanthropy is much more than just writing a check. It's donating your time, energy, experience, and intellect to the causes and organizations you are passionate about."

In 2015, former trustee Joan Weill offered an additional $20 million to the Paul Smith's College, but only if it changed its name to "Joan Weill-Paul Smith's College", a change that would have violated the terms of the devise of the school's real property, which required that the school be "forever known" as Paul Smith's College of Arts and Sciences. Paul Smith's then applied to the New York State Supreme Court in the state capital of Albany, for a release from the naming clause of Phelps Smith, the 1937 donor's will, arguing that its continued future financial survival depended on receipt of trustee Mrs. Weill's generous $20 million gift. Notwithstanding that argument, there was considerable opposition to the requested name change from college alumni and others. The college was originally funded by the last will and testament of Apollo ("Paul") Smith's youngest son, Phelps Smith, who specified that the collegiate institution should be "forever known" by his father's, (Apollos ("Paul") Smith (1825–1912), and founder of the notable local resort Paul Smith's Hotel in the Adirondacks Mountains region of northern Upstate New York) name. In light of the potential donation, the college petitioned to be released from the will's conditions, but their appeal was denied by Judge John T. Ellis of the state supreme court in August 2015, and the Weill donation was unfortunately withdrawn.

In 2016, Sandy and Joan Weill announced a $185 million contribution to the University of California at San Francisco (UCSF) for a new neuroscience institute. At the time, the gift was the largest donation in the university branch campus' history. The Weill Institute for Neurosciences is now currently housed in a $316 million facility at UCSF's Mission Bay campus in San Francisco. The Weills hope the Institute there will develop more effective treatments for such debilitating and increasing amounts of diseases such as Alzheimer's, Parkinson's diseases of the human brain, plus multiple sclerosis, sleep disorders, autism, and other brain-related ailments. In 2019, the Weills pledged an additional $106 million for neuroscience research at UCSF, along with similar other research work being done at the UC Berkeley, and at the University of Washington in Seattle, further north up the West Coast. The Weills are among UC Berkeley's top benefactors, with the couple contributing over $52 million in fiscal year 2020 alone; Weill Hall is named in their honor, and Sandy Weill is a member of the university's board of visitors.

In 2025, Sandy and Joan Weill pledged a $100 million matching grant through the Weill Family Foundation to establish the Weill Cancer Hub West, a ten-year, $200 million initiative uniting the UCSF Helen Diller Family Comprehensive Cancer Center and the Stanford Cancer Institute. The project aims to raise an additional $100 million—$50 million from each university—bringing total funding to $200 million. The initiative supports four key research areas: in-body CAR-T cell engineering to generate therapeutic immune cells within patients; artificial intelligence-guided cellular therapies for treatment-resistant tumors; interventions in diet and metabolism to improve cancer outcomes (including in pancreatic cancer); and AI-driven personalized care to tailor treatments using genomic, clinical, and lifestyle data.

The Weill Cancer Hub West is the largest collaborative cancer research initiative on the West Coast and is intended to accelerate cancer discoveries through partnership across institutions, advanced technologies, and translational science. The initiative builds on earlier efforts such as the Weill Cancer Hub East and complements the Weills’ extensive philanthropic legacy, which includes more than $1 billion in lifetime giving and over $400 million directed toward research and education in the San Francisco Bay Area.

The University of California, Davis, announced on January 28, 2026, that the largest gift ever made to veterinary medicine worldwide: $120 million from philanthropists Joan and Sanford I. Weill through the Weill Family Foundation, was selected for UC-Davis to support its top-ranked veterinary school. In recognition of this commitment, the university has renamed the UC Davis School of Veterinary Medicine to the University of California, Davis, Joan and Sanford I. Weill School of Veterinary Medicine – or simply the UC Davis Weill School of Veterinary Medicine.

Business positions
Preceded by John S. Reed	Citigroup CEO; 1998–2003	Succeeded by Charles Prince
Preceded by John S. Reed	Chairman of Citigroup; 1998–2000 (Co-Chairman); 2000–2006 (sole chairman)	Succeeded by Charles Prince
