= Charles A. Riley II =

American author and academic

Charles A. Riley ll is an American author who writes on the arts and a college professor. He is the former director of the Nassau County Museum of Art and a professor at Clarkson University. Riley is the author of thirty nine books.

Riley was born and raised in Manhasset, Long Island, New York. He is a graduate of Princeton University.

Riley served from 2017 until 2023 as the director of the Nassau County Museum of Art.

Among Riley's volumes is the Art of Peter Max, The Jazz Age in France, High-access Home How the Jazz Age Reinvented Modernism (University of Chicago Press), and Arthur Carter.

RIley is currently a professor at the Beacon Institute of Clarkson University.
