= Peter A. Cohen =

American banker (1946–2019)

- Born: {August 20, 1946
- Education: Ohio State University
- Occupation: Banker
- Known for: Cowen Inc. (Chairman & CEO); Shearson Lehman American Express (Chairman & CEO)
- Spouse: Brooke Goodman
- Parent(s): Florence & Sidney B. Cohen

Peter A. Cohen is the chairman and CEO of Andover National Corporation, a public holding company. He was formerly the chairman and CEO of Cowen Inc., also known as Cowen & Company now TD Cowen. Prior to his current role, Cohen founded Ramius Capital Management in 1994, a $13 billion investment firm, which he merged with Cowen Inc. in 2009. Prior to this, Cohen was the chairman and chief executive officer of Shearson Lehman American Express from 1983 through 1991.

== Early life and education ==
Cohen was born and raised on Long Island, New York. He is of Jewish descent. Cohen graduated from Ohio State University in 1968 and received his MBA from Columbia Business School in 1969.

== Career ==
Cohen began his career on Wall Street at Reynolds & Co., later part of Dean Witter Reynolds and in 1970, joined CBWL-Hayden Stone. In 1973, Cohen was appointed assistant to the firm's chairman, Sanford I. Weill, the architect of a major consolidation of brokerage and investment banking firms in the 1960s and 1970s. Cohen would remain with the firm and was integral to its various mergers in the 1970s, including Shearson, Hammill & Co. and Loeb, Rhoades, Hornblower & Co. While there he held various positions including CAO, CFO, COO, chairman and CEO.

In 1978, Cohen left Shearson for one year to work for Edmond Safra at Republic New York Corporation and the Trade Development Bank before returning to Shearson in 1979. Shearson merged with American Express in 1981 at which time Cohen became president and chief operating officer and in 1983 chairman and chief executive officer. At age 36, Cohen was by far the youngest head of a major Wall Street firm. Shearson went on to acquire Lehman Brothers Inc. in 1984 and EF Hutton in 1988. During Cohen's career at Shearson, the firm made 24 acquisitions.

In 1988, Cohen was a key player in the leveraged buyout of RJR Nabisco. Cohen and Shearson Lehman supported the company's CEO F. Ross Johnson in a proposed $17 billion buyout. Ultimately, Johnson and Cohen lost their bid for the company and RJR Nabisco was acquired by the private equity firm Kohlberg Kravis Roberts. Cohen was portrayed by Peter Riegert in the 1993 film Barbarians at the Gate depicting the RJR Nabisco buyout.

In 1991, Cohen founded the securities and asset management businesses of Republic National Bank of New York. From November 1992 to May 1994, Cohen was vice chairman and a director of Republic New York. In July 1994, he founded an asset management company, Ramius Capital Group, which grew to $13 billion in assets undermanagement by 2008. In 2009, Ramius acquired Cowen and Co., a 100-year-old biotechnology and technology-focused securities firm where Cohen was chairman and CEO until December 2018 and chairman through June 2019.

In 2019, Cohen retired from Cowen to pursue building new businesses and subsequently started three companies: Peter Cohen LLC, a personal holding company that invests in private and public companies; Difesa Capital Management, an arbitrage investment partnership he started with his son, Andrew Cohen; and Andover National Corporation, a holding company created for the purpose of acquiring essential-service companies.

Over his career, Cohen has served on numerous corporate and philanthropic boards including those of American Express, The New York Stock Exchange, Kroll Inc., Olivetti, Linkem S.p.A., Telecom Italia, L-3 Corporation, The New York City Opera, The Mount Sinai Medical Center and the Children's Hearing Institute. He is currently lead director for Scientific Games, chairman of the board of directors of PolarityTE, a biologics company, and a director of Quadrant Biosciences, a diagnostics company built around epigenetics. He is also chairman of the American Museum of Finance and a director of the Gift of Life Marrow Foundation.

== Personal life ==
Cohen has been married twice. His first marriage ended in divorce. He is married to former flight attendant Brooke Goodman; they have a daughter.
