= Penske Automotive Group =

International transportation services company

Penske Automotive Group, Inc.
- Type: Public company
- Traded as: NYSE: PAG; S&P 400 component
- Industry: Automotive, Auto Dealerships, Vehicle Parts, Transportation Services, Commercial Vehicles, Commercial Vehicle Dealerships, Truck Parts & Services
- Founded: 1990; 36 years ago
- Founder: Marshall Cogan, as United Auto Group
- Headquarters: Bloomfield Hills, Michigan, U.S.
- Number of locations: 362 franchised retail automotive dealerships (June 2026)
- Area served: United States, Germany, United Kingdom, Ireland Australia, New Zealand, Spain, Italy
- Key people: Roger Penske (Chairman & CEO)
- Products: Transportation Services
- Services: Financial services, Repair
- Revenue: ▲US$30.5 billion (2024)
- Operating income: ▼US$1.32 billion (2024)
- Net income: ▼US$919 million (2024)
- Total assets: ▲US$16.7 billion (2024)
- Total equity: ▲US$5.21 billion (2024)
- Number of employees: 28,900 (2024)
- Parent: Penske Corporation
- Divisions: Sytner Group; Premier Truck Group; Penske Commercial Vehicles; Penske Power Systems; CarShop
- Website: penskeautomotive.com

Penske Automotive Group, Inc. (PAG) is an American transportation services company headquartered in Bloomfield Hills, Michigan. It operates automotive and commercial truck dealers principally in the United States, Canada, and Western Europe, and distributes commercial vehicles, engines, power systems, and related parts and services principally in Australia and New Zealand. Additionally, PAG owns 28.9% of Penske Transportation Solutions, a business that manages a fleet of over 400,000 trucks, tractors, and trailers. PAG is a member of the Fortune 500, Russell 1000, and Russell 3000 indexes. As of June 30, 2026 the company operated 362 franchised retail automotive dealerships, of which 146 were in the United States and 216 abroad, chiefly in the United Kingdom.

In October 2026 the company agreed to be taken private by Penske Corporation and Mitsui & Co., its two largest shareholders, in a transaction that values it at approximately $16.3 billion.

== History ==
=== Origins and name change ===
Penske Automotive was founded as United Automotive Group in 1990 by Marshall S. Cogan, and later came under the control of Penske Corporation and Roger Penske in May 1999. Several years later, on July 2, 2007, United Automotive Group changed its corporate name to Penske Automotive Group, Inc; and changed its ticker symbol on the NYSE to PAG.

=== Attempted purchase of Saturn ===
In February 2009, General Motors declared its intent to part with the Saturn brand by closing or selling the division, either to investors or to dealers, as part of restructuring plans dependent upon the receipt of a second round of government loans ("bailout" funding). In June 2009, it was announced with much fanfare that Penske Automotive Group would purchase Saturn and its assets from General Motors. Less than four months later, on September 30, the deal collapsed as Penske announced it would terminate the deal with GM blaming manufacturing uncertainties with certain models.

=== Acquisition of Penske Motor Group ===
On November 19, 2025, a wholly owned subsidiary of the company purchased all membership interests in Penske Motor Group, LLC, acquiring four franchised dealerships: Longo Toyota and Longo Lexus in El Monte, California, Lexus of Stevens Creek in San Jose, and Longo Toyota of Prosper in Prosper, Texas. The seller was majority owned and operated by Greg Penske, by then vice-chairman of Penske Automotive Group, with about 5 per cent held by another partner and the remainder by Penske Corporation; the buyer had previously held no interest in the dealerships.

A filing with the U.S. Securities and Exchange Commission placed the purchase price at $519,423,000. Because of the relationship between the parties, the board's approval was made conditional on a recommendation from a special committee of independent directors, which negotiated the terms, engaged its own legal and financial advisers and had the authority to reject the transaction. The dealerships had retailed more than 28,000 new and used vehicles in 2024 and were expected to add about $1.5& billion in annualised revenue; existing management was retained and the purchase brought the company to 16 Toyota and seven Lexus franchises.

=== Portfolio management, 2025–2026 ===
Penske Automotive combined the purchase with disposals. Roger Penske said the sale of two Lexus dealerships, in Warwick, Rhode Island and Madison, Wisconsin, had made it possible to buy the Penske Motor Group stores as well as two further Lexus dealerships in central Florida, Lexus of Orlando and Lexus of Winter Park, in a separate transaction announced on January 26, 2026 and expected to add about $450 million in annualised revenue.

Describing the approach on an April 29, 2026 earnings call, Roger Penske said the board set a strategy on brands and locations about eighteen months earlier, reviewing low performers and manufacturers' capital expenditure expectations and identifying sites to sell to reach target returns. Of roughly $1.6 billion in annualised revenue that the company added through acquisitions and openings during 2025, the Penske Motor Group transaction accounted for the large majority.

=== Agreement to go private ===
On October 15, 2026 the company agreed to a previously disclosed offer under which Penske Corporation and Mitsui & Co. would acquire the 27.8 per cent of its shares they did not already own for $3.9 billion in cash. Minority shareholders are to receive $212.00 per share, a premium of about 8.8 per cent over the closing price on October 14, giving the company an enterprise value of approximately $16.3 billion. On completion the shares will cease to trade on the New York Stock Exchange.

The proposal was first disclosed on July 22, 2026 and was evaluated by a special committee of independent directors chaired by board member David Hoogendoorn, who said the committee had weighed the transaction against remaining a public company and concluded that it offered the greatest value to minority shareholders. Before the transaction Roger Penske, Penske Corporation and Penske Automotive Holdings Corp. together held about 52 per cent of the company and Mitsui and its American subsidiary about 20.3 per cent. Afterwards ownership is to be divided approximately 64 per cent Penske and 36 per cent Mitsui.

== See also ==
- Sytner Group
- Penske Corporation
