= Arthur Levitt =

American businessman, journalist and 25th SEC chairman

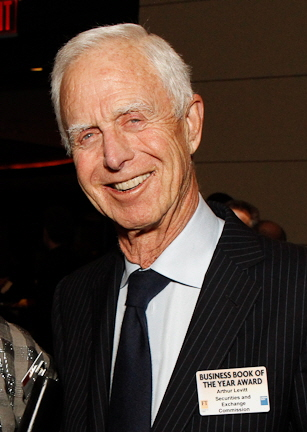
- Levitt in 2012

25th Chairman of the Securities and Exchange Commission
- In office July 27, 1993 – February 9, 2001
- President: Bill Clinton; George W. Bush
- Preceded by: Richard C. Breeden
- Succeeded by: Harvey Pitt

Personal details
- Born: Arthur Levitt Jr. February 3, 1931 (age 95) Brooklyn, New York
- Party: Democratic
- Spouse: Marylin Blauner
- Relations: Arthur Levitt Sr. (father)
- Education: Williams College (BA)

Arthur Levitt Jr. (born February 3, 1931) is the former chairman of the United States Securities and Exchange Commission (SEC). He served from 1993 to 2001 as the twenty-fifth and longest-serving chairman of the commission. Widely hailed as a champion of the individual investor, he has been criticized for not pushing for tougher accounting rules. Since May 2001 he has been employed as a senior adviser at the Carlyle Group. Levitt previously served as a policy advisor to Goldman Sachs and is a Director of Bloomberg LP, parent of Bloomberg News.

== Early life and career ==
Levitt grew up in a Jewish family in Brooklyn. Levitt's father, Arthur Levitt Sr., served as New York State Comptroller for 24 years and was sole trustee of the largest pension fund in America at the time. Levitt attended Brant Lake Camp, a summer camp for boys in the Adirondacks. He attended and graduated from Poly Prep Country Day School in Brooklyn in 1948. He graduated Phi Beta Kappa from Williams College in 1952, before serving for two years in the Air Force. He first worked as a drama critic for The Berkshire Eagle, and after the Air Force, he was with Time-Life for five years before selling cattle and ranches as tax shelters.

In 1963, Levitt joined the brokerage firm Carter, Berlind & Weill, founded three years earlier by Sanford I. Weill. Levitt's name was eventually added to the firm's when it was renamed Cogan, Berlind, Weill & Levitt in the mid-1960s; through a series of mergers the firm eventually evolved into Shearson Loeb Rhoades. After sixteen years on Wall Street, Levitt became the chairman of the American Stock Exchange (AMEX) in 1978. In 1989, he left the AMEX to serve as Chairman of the New York City Economic Development Corporation until 1993.

Before joining the SEC, Levitt owned Roll Call, a newspaper that covers Capitol Hill, which he purchased from the paper's founder, Sid Yudain, in 1986. The newspaper was eventually sold to The Economist for $15 million in 1993.

== Chairman of the SEC ==
Levitt was appointed to his first five-year term as Chairman of the SEC by President Clinton in July 1993 and reappointed in May 1998. He left the Commission on February 9, 2001, and was succeeded by Harvey Pitt. At the time Levitt came to the SEC, the Financial Accounting Standards Board (FASB) had proposed requiring companies to record stock options on their income statements. According to a Merrill Lynch study, expensing stock options would have reduced profits among leading high-tech companies by 60% on average. Congress began to exert pressure on the FASB, and on May 3, 1994, the Senate, led by Democratic Senator Joe Lieberman, offered a non-binding resolution urging FASB not to adopt the proposed rule; the vote in favor was 88–9. Concerned that insensitivity to this sentiment in Congress might threaten FASB as an independent standard setter, Levitt urged the FASB to not go ahead with the rule proposal. He later said this "was probably the single biggest mistake I made in my years at the SEC."

In September 1998 at New York University, he gave a speech entitled "The Numbers Game". It addressed five ways in which corporations were managing earnings (big bath charges, creative acquisition accounting, cookie-jar reserves, materiality, revenue recognition). In his speech, Levitt advocated improving the transparency and comparability of financial statements. In 1997, the SEC under Levitt's leadership approved the exemption of some Enron partnerships from the tight accounting controls of the Investment Company Act of 1940.

== After the SEC ==
As of 2020, Levitt serves on the Board of Directors for RiskMetrics Group. In 2005, Levitt was named a special advisor to the American International Group's board of directors and the board's nominating and corporate governance committee following the resignation of CEO and Chairman Maurice "Hank" Greenberg, who left after an investigation into the firm's accounting practices by New York Attorney General Eliot Spitzer.

Levitt oversaw an audit published in August 2006, by Kroll Inc. – where he is a consultant – describing how the City of San Diego had allowed a pension deficit of $1.43 billion. The report blamed around 30 city officials, including five incumbent council members. Kroll charged the City of San Diego $21 million for the report, with Levitt's time billed at $900 per hour.

== Awards and honors ==
In January 2001, Levitt received the "Award for Distinguished Leadership in Global Capital Markets" from the Yale School of Management. The Arthur Levitt State Office Building in downtown Manhattan was named for him until it was sold to private developers in 2000.

== See also ==
- Securities and Exchange Commission appointees

== Notes ==
Government offices
Preceded by Richard C. Breeden	Securities and Exchange Commission Chair; 1993–2001	Succeeded by Harvey Pitt
