= Stephen Swid =

American businessman and investor (1940–2019)

- Born: Stephen Claar Swid; October 26, 1940; Manhattan, New York City, United States
- Died: October 6, 2019 (aged 78); Bronx, New York City
- Education: Ohio State University
- Occupations: Businessman and investor
- Known for: founding of SBK Entertainment
- Spouse: Nan G. Swid
- Children: 3

Stephen Claar Swid (October 26, 1940 – October 6, 2019) was an American businessman and investor. He served as the chairman and chief executive officer of SESAC, Inc., one of the three performing rights organizations in the US.

Swid was also noted for founding SBK Entertainment and was also previously the co-owner of General Felt Industries, Sheller-Globe Corporation, Knoll International and the 21 Club, along with partner Marshall Cogan.

== Early life and education ==
Born into a Jewish family in New York in 1940, Swid was a graduate of Ohio State University.

== Career ==
He went on to become founder and senior partner of Swid Investors, an investment limited partnership, as well as a general partner of the private management company City Associates, a senior investment officer at Oppenheimer Funds, and a securities analyst of the Dreyfus Fund.

Swid's first deal was the takeover of General Felt Industries (GFI) in 1974, which he completed with fellow investment banker Marshall Cogan. The duo would then merge GFI with Knoll International and use Knoll as a holding company to acquire a series of businesses. For twelve years, until July 1986, Swid was co-chairman and co-CEO of Knoll.

Among Swid and Cogan's most notable acquisitions were the takeover of the Sheller-Globe Corporation and, later, the purchase of the 21 Club. Cogan was unsuccessful in his high-profile bids to acquire the Boston Red Sox, Sotheby's and L.F. Rothschild in the buyout boom of the 1980s.

In 1986, Swid purchased CBS Songs, the music publishing unit of CBS, which would later become the beginning of SBK Entertainment World, a leading music publisher and worldwide entertainment services company. From November, 1986, until May, 1989, Swid was chairman and chief executive officer of SBK Entertainment World.

From February 1990 until January 1995, Swid was chairman and chief executive officer of Westview Press, an academic publishing company based in Boulder, Colorado, and from 1989 until 1997 the chairman and chief executive officer of Spin, a music and youth culture magazine.

== Other affiliations ==
Due to his interest in foreign relations and international diplomacy, Swid was a member of the Council on Foreign Relations and past director of the East West Institute.

Swid was an active supporter of the arts and education and served as a director of The Municipal Art Society of New York. He was a trustee and chairman of the Executive & Finance Committee of The Solomon R. Guggenheim Museum and was a member of the Visiting Committee on 20th Century Art for the Metropolitan Museum of Art. He and his wife, artist Nan G. Swid, were financial supporters of the Jewish Theological Seminary of America.

He also served as a trustee of the Horace Mann School and as executive vice president of the board of the Lenox School, both located in New York City.

== Personal life ==
He was married to artist Nan Swid. They had three children together – Jill, Robin and Scott.
