= 21 Club =

Restaurant in Manhattan, New York (1922–2020)

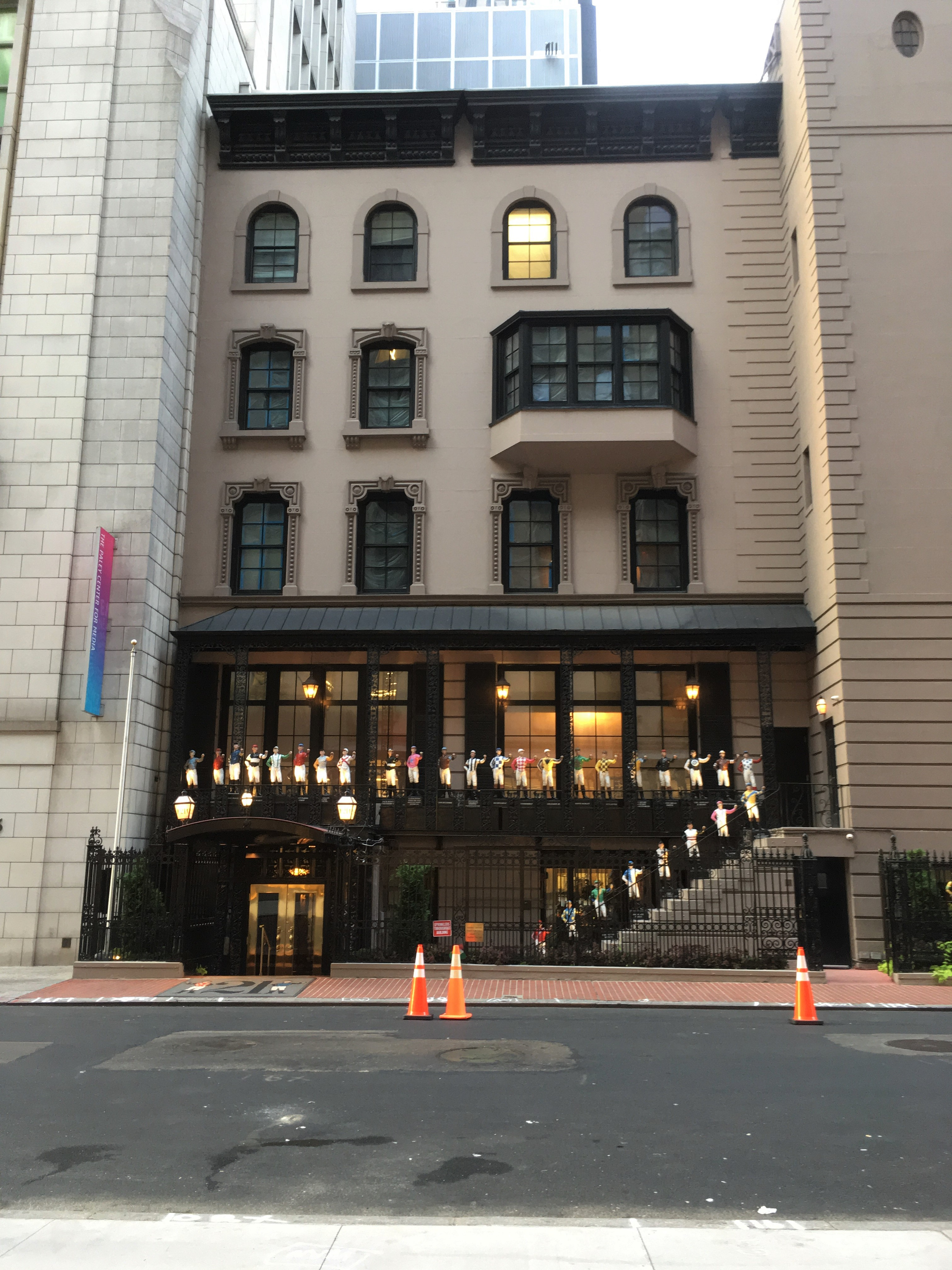
- 21 West 52nd Street in 2018
- Interactive map of 21 Club

Restaurant information
- Established: 1922; 104 years ago
- Closed: December 11, 2020
- Owners: Belmond Ltd. (since 1995); Marshall S. Cogan and Stephen Swid (1985–1995); Jack Kriendler and Charlie Berns and families (1922–1985)
- Head chef: Sylvain Delpique
- Dress code: Jacket required, jeans not permitted
- Location: 21 West 52nd Street, New York City, 10019, United States
- Coordinates: 40°45′37.8″N 73°58′38.6″W
- Reservations: Recommended
- Website: www.21club.com/

The 21 Club, often simply 21, was a traditional American cuisine restaurant and former prohibition-era speakeasy, located at 21 West 52nd Street in New York City. Prior to its closure in 2020, the club had been active for 90 years, and it had hosted almost every US president since Franklin Delano Roosevelt. It had a hidden wine cellar where it stored the collections of celebrities such as Elizabeth Taylor and Sophia Loren. One of its signatures was 37 statues of racing jockeys donated by patrons, the uniforms of many painted to match the winning jockeys of horses they owned.

After being shut down by the COVID-19 pandemic, the establishment announced in December 2020 that it would not reopen "in its current form for the foreseeable future" and was considering how to keep the restaurant a viable operation in the long term.

== History ==
=== First version and Prohibition ===
The first version of the club opened in Greenwich Village in 1922, run by cousins Jack Kriendler and Charlie Berns. It was originally a small speakeasy known as the Red Head. In 1925 the location was moved to a basement on Washington Place and its name was changed to Frontón. The following year it moved uptown to 42 West 49th Street, changed its name to the Puncheon Club, and became much more exclusive.

In late 1929, to make way for the construction of Rockefeller Center, the club moved to 21 West 52nd Street and changed its name to Jack and Charlie's "21". It opened at that location on January 1, 1930, when it was estimated there were 32,000 speakeasies in New York City. Although raided by police on many occasions during Prohibition, the premises' staff had methods to protect the club from the authorities. As soon as a raid began, a system of levers was used to tip the shelves of the bar, sweeping the liquor bottles through a chute and into the city's sewers. The bar also included a secret wine cellar, which was accessed through a hidden door in a brick wall which opened into the basement of the building next door (number 19). Though still used as a wine cellar after Prohibition, part of the vault has been remodeled to allow a party of up to 20 guests to dine in private. The club also stored the private wine collections of John F. Kennedy; Richard Nixon; Gerald Ford; Joan Crawford; Elizabeth Taylor; Hugh Carey; Ernest Hemingway; the Nordstrom sisters; Frank Sinatra; Al Jolson; Gloria Vanderbilt; Sophia Loren; Mae West; Aristotle Onassis; Gene Kelly; Gloria Swanson; Judy Garland; Sammy Davis Jr.; and Marilyn Monroe. The bar is mentioned several times in David Niven's memoirs, Bring on the Empty Horses; he was given a job by J+C selling liquor following the end of prohibition, and went there with director John Huston on their return from the war.

According to The New York Times, in 1950 when most burgers cost a dime at coffee shops, 21 Club charged $2.75. The prestigious International Debutante Ball, which has presented many daughters and granddaughters of U.S. presidents to high society at the Waldorf-Astoria Hotel in New York City, has hosted its pre-ball parties at 21 Club.

The restaurant was a favorite of Donald Trump, who held his wedding reception there in 1977.

=== New owners and dress code ===
In 1985, the Kriendler and Berns families sold their interests in the restaurant to General Felt Industries, a holding company headed by Marshall S. Cogan and Stephen Swid. Ten years later, Cogan and Swid sold the restaurant to Orient-Express Hotels. In 1995 it became part of Orient-Express Hotels Ltd. which in 2014 changed its name to Belmond Ltd.

On January 24, 2009, it ended its long-standing policy of requiring men to wear neckties at dinner. Wearing a jacket, however, was still required, and loaner jackets by Michael Kors and Ralph Lauren were available for men to borrow if they had neglected to bring one. In mid-2015, all 37 jockeys were removed for a three-month artist restoration; they returned on October 21, 2015, for a ribbon-cutting.

=== Pandemic and closure ===
In March 2020, indoor dining at all New York City restaurants, including 21 Club, ceased due to the COVID-19 pandemic. In November 2020, the club's managers stated that it had made the decision to keep the club permanently closed. The signature jockey statues were removed in December 2020. Though New York restaurants were able to reopen briefly later in the year, a second shutdown caused the restaurant to announce on December 11 that it had ceased operations indefinitely and that employees would be terminated in March 2021, citing economic uncertainty. 21 Club was one of many restaurants in New York City that were permanently closed during the pandemic.

On March 9, 2021, the club's 148 mostly unionized employees were officially laid off with a notice filed with the New York Department of Labor. When it closed, it had been active for 90 years, and it had hosted every US president since Franklin Delano Roosevelt excluding George W. Bush. It also had a hidden wine cellar where it stored the collections of individuals such as Elizabeth Taylor, Richard Nixon, and Sophia Loren. LVMH subsidiary Belmond informed The New York Times that the restaurant was gone, but that a "distinctive" restaurant might be created instead, saying a month later no "final concept" had been settled on. In November 2021, Eater reported that former employees had been publicly protesting LVMH's decision to close the club, and that the union had been neither offered severance packages or job assurances over around a year, with terms remaining unsettled.

== Ambiance ==
The Bar Room included a restaurant, a lounge and, as the name implied, a bar. The walls and ceiling of the Bar Room were covered with antique toys and sports memorabilia donated by famous patrons. Perhaps the best known feature of 21 was the line of painted cast iron lawn jockey statues which adorned the balcony above the entrance. In the 1930s, some of the affluent customers of the bar began to show their appreciation by presenting 21 with jockeys painted to represent the racing colors of the stables they owned. In 2006, there were 33 jockeys on the exterior of the building, and 2 more inside the doors. New York Magazine wrote "It's a New York icon, but the midtown stalwart is nevertheless starting to feel like it's stuck in the past," noting the dress code and decor.

The first of the signature statues of jockeys outside the restaurant had been added in the 1930s after a donation, with more donated by New York families such as the Vanderbilts and Mellons.

== Reception ==
Between 2003 and 2015, the restaurant was a recipient of the Wine Spectator Grand Award. In 2017, Zagat gave it a food rating of 4.3 out of 5.

Ian Fleming described the club as "The best speak-easy in New York" in his 1956 James Bond book, Diamonds Are Forever.

== See also ==
- List of restaurants in New York City
