= The New York Observer =

American weekly newspaper-turned media site

Observer

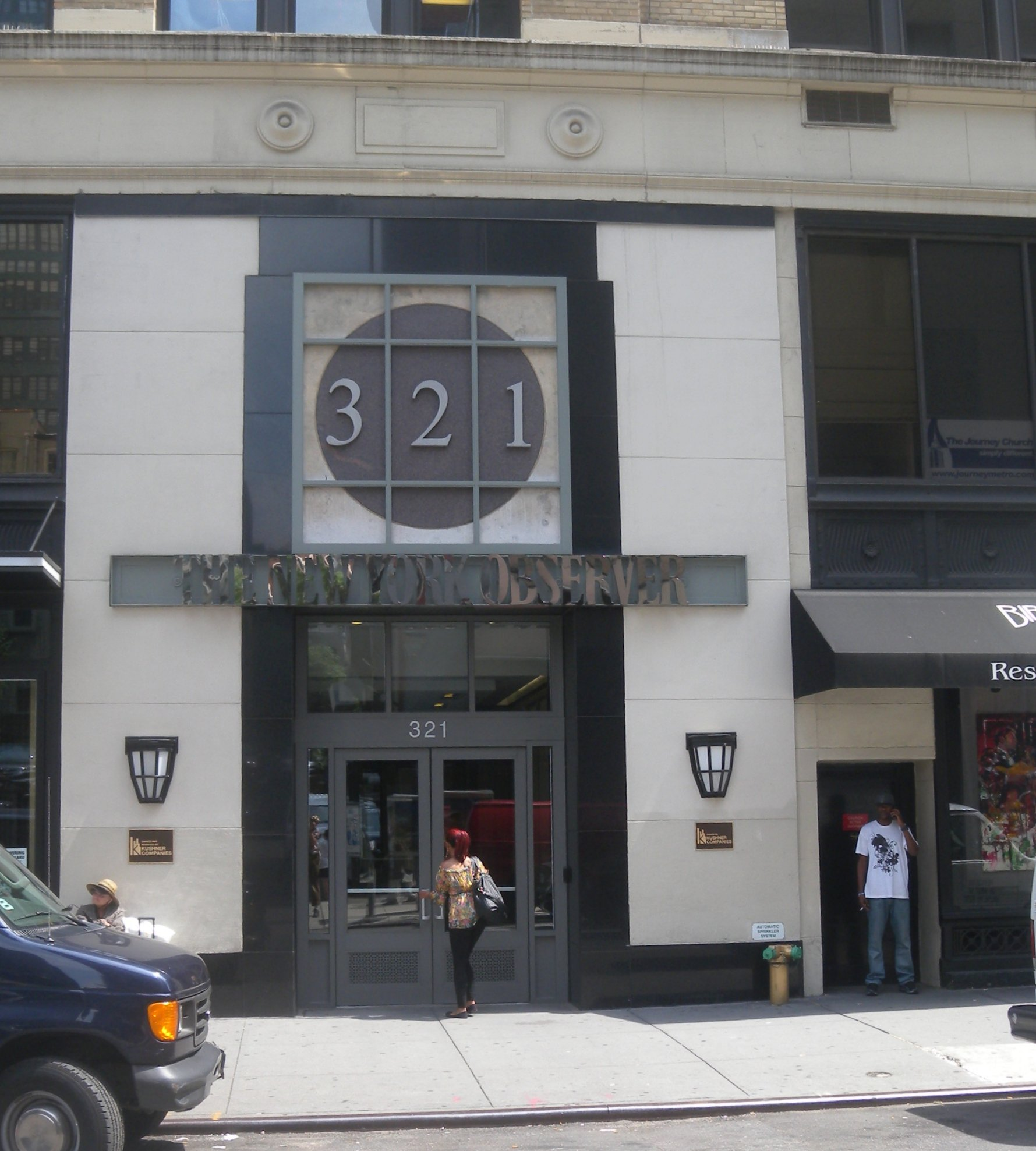
- Headquarters at 321 West 44th Street, New York
- Type: Website, formerly weekly newspaper
- Format: Broadsheet (1987–2007; 2011–2014); Tabloid (2007–2011; 2014–2016); Online only (2016–present)
- Owners: Observer Media; Joseph Meyer; Jared Kushner (former)
- Founder: Arthur L. Carter
- Publisher: Joseph Meyer
- President: James Karklins
- Founded: September 22, 1987; 39 years ago
- Language: English
- Headquarters: 1 Whitehall Street
- City: New York City, New York
- Country: United States
- ISSN: 1052-2948
- OCLC number: 17544657
- Website: observer.com

The New York Observer was a weekly newspaper established in 1987. In 2016, it ceased print publication and became the online-only newspaper Observer. The media site focuses on culture, real estate, media, politics and the entertainment and publishing industries.

== History ==
The Observer was first published in New York City on September 22, 1987, as a weekly alternative newspaper by Arthur L. Carter, a former investment banker. The New York Observer had also been the title of an earlier weekly religious paper founded 164 years before by Sidney E. Morse in 1823.

After almost two decades, in July 2006, the paper was purchased by the American real estate figure Jared Kushner, then only 25 years old. The paper began its life as a broadsheet, and was then printed in tabloid format every Wednesday, and currently has an exclusively online format on an internet website. It is headquartered at 1 Whitehall Street in lower Manhattan.

Previous prominent writers for the publication include Joe Conason, Doree Shafrir, Hilton Kramer, Andrew Sarris, Richard Brookhiser, Michael Tomasky, Azi Paybarah, Ross Barkan, John Heilpern, Robert Gottlieb, Nicholas von Hoffman, Simon Doonan, Anne Roiphe, Terry Golway, Ron Rosenbaum, Michael M. Thomas, Philip Weiss, and Steve Kornacki.

The paper published Candace Bushnell's column "Sex and the City" about Manhattan's social life and emotional relationships on which the trend-setting popular television series Sex and the City (later also with two successful feature films) is based.

It was visually distinctive because of its use of sketch illustrations and salmon-colored newsprint, with the latter compared to the similar physical appearance of the Financial Times from Britain. Henry Rollins once described it as "the curiously pink newspaper". The paper switched in 2014 to using regular white newsprint for its last two years on paper.

The fourth and longest-serving editor for the newspaper, Peter Kaplan, left the publication on July 1, 2009. Interim editor Tom McGeveran was replaced by Kyle Pope later that year in November 2009. Two years later, Elizabeth Spiers then served as editor for a year from 2011 to 2012, followed by interim editor Aaron Gell. In January 2013, publisher Jared Kushner named his longtime friend Ken Kurson, a political consultant, journalist, and author, as the Observer's next editor.

Publication of the weekly print edition ended with the November 9, 2016 issue. Observer Media, the publication's parent company, has continued to publish content on an online website under the masthead title of the "Observer" (dropping "New York" from the name).

The discontinuation of the print Observer came the day after editor Kushner's father-in-law, Donald Trump (Trump's daughter Ivanka is Kushner's wife), won the 2016 presidential election; becoming the 45th President of the United States, serving one term to 2021. Kushner served as a senior adviser in the Trump administration. Kushner transferred his ownership of Observer Media's remaining online assets into a Trump family trust, through which his brother-in-law Joseph Meyer took over his former role as publisher during that time.

== Ownership ==
The publisher and original owner, Arthur Carter, has had other publishing interests, including the Litchfield County Times. At one time, he was a part‑owner in The East Hampton Star. Carter received a B.A. in French literature from Brown University and an M.B.A. in finance from the Tuck School of Business at Dartmouth College. He spent 25 years in investment banking until 1981, when he founded the Litchfield County Times in New Milford, Connecticut. He owned it for twenty years until selling to Journal Register Company, later also selling his 50‑percent interest in The East Hampton Star in 2003. He has been an adjunct professor of philosophy and journalism at New York University and is a trustee.

In July 2006, Jared Kushner, a 25‑year‑old law student and son of a wealthy New Jersey developer, Charles Kushner, purchased the paper for just under $10 million.

In January 2017, Jared Kushner announced he would sell his stake to a Kushner family trust, when he became a senior advisor to President Donald Trump. Kushner's brother-in-law, Joseph Meyer, who has been the CEO of Observer Media Group since 2013, replaced him as publisher.

== Political stance ==
In 2016, the Observer became one of a handful of newspapers to officially endorse United States presidential candidate Donald Trump in the Republican Party presidential primaries. The newspaper's owner and then publisher, Jared Kushner, is Trump's son-in-law and was an advisor to the Trump presidential campaign. The Observer did not repeat its endorsement after Trump became the Republican nominee for President.
