= International Review of Cell and Molecular Biology =

- Discipline: Molecular biology, cellular biology
- Language: English

Publication details
- Former name(s): International Review of Cytology
- Publisher: Elsevier

Standard abbreviations
- ISO 4: Int. Rev. Cell Mol. Biol.

Indexing
- International Review of Cell and Molecular Biology
- ISSN: 1937-6448
- OCLC no.: 174222860
- International Review of Cytology
- CODEN: IRCYAJ
- ISSN: 0074-7696
- OCLC no.: 00928149

Links
- Journal homepage

The International Review of Cell and Molecular Biology is a scientific book series that publishes articles on plant and animal cell biology. Until 2008 it was known as the International Review of Cytology.
