= Institute of Molecular and Cell Biology =

Institute of Molecular and Cell Biology may refer to:

- Institute of Molecular and Cell Biology (Porto), a research institute in Porto, Portugal.
- Institute of Molecular and Cell Biology (Singapore), a research institute in Singapore.
- Institute of Molecular and Cell Biology (Strasbourg), a research institute in Strasbourg, France.
