= Arthur L. Carter =

American banker and publisher (1931–2025)

- Born: December 24, 1931; New York City, U.S.
- Died: December 7, 2025 (aged 93); New York City, U.S.
- Education: Brown University (BA); Dartmouth College (MBA)
- Known for: Investment banker, publisher, artist
- Spouses: Linda Schweitzer (m. 1957; div. 1965); Dixie Carter (m. 1967; div. 1977); Linda Kessler (m. 1980)
- Children: 5

Arthur Lloyd Carter (December 24, 1931 – December 7, 2025) was an American investment banker, publisher and visual artist. He began his career in finance before moving into publishing, and was known for founding The New York Observer in 1987.

== Background ==
Arthur Lloyd Carter was born on December 24, 1931, in Manhattan, New York, to a Jewish family. His grandparents immigrated to the United States from Hungary. Carter was raised in Woodmere, New York, and graduated from Brown University in 1953 with a degree in French literature. He served in the U.S. Coast Guard as an officer from 1953 to 1956.

== Career ==
Carter worked for Lehman Brothers for a period of time, but after taking a break to study at Dartmouth's Tuck School of Business, he started Carter, Berlind, & Weill in 1960, which eventually grew into Shearson Loeb Rhoades, later merging with Lehman to form Shearson Lehman Brothers.

After ten years, he sold his stake in Carter Berlind and tried his hand at several other businesses through the holding company Utilities & Industries Corporation. Eventually, deciding that he wanted to run a newspaper, he started the Litchfield County Times, when no existing paper met his criteria. In December 1985, he was able to buy a controlling stake in The Nation. In 1987, he founded the weekly paper The New York Observer, which covered New York culture and politics. In 1995, he sold The Nation, in 2001, he sold the Litchfield County Times, and he sold The Observer in 2006.

In 2008, New York University renamed its journalism department the Arthur L. Carter Journalism Institute. Carter had previously taught at NYU as an adjunct professor of philosophy and journalism.

== Personal life and death ==
Carter had three children: Jon, Whendy, and Ellen from his first marriage to Linda Schweitzer, which lasted from 1957 until their divorce in 1965. In 1967, he married actress Dixie Carter, with whom he had two daughters, Ginna and Mary Dixie. They divorced 10 years later. In 1980, he married Dr. Linda Kessler. His stepdaughter is actress Ali Marsh, whose husband is actor Fred Weller. He had 12 grandchildren.

He was also a visual artist: his paintings and sculptures have been exhibited in Tennessee, Rhode Island, and Paris, among other places. Charles A. Riley ll who has authored two volumes on Carter's work has written of it ..."Arthur Carter's metal sculpture is a form of drawing in space, and so it is not surprising that analytical, exploratory drawing is the foundation of his practice as an artist".

Carter died at a hospital in Manhattan on December 7, 2025, at the age of 93.
