= Shearson (disambiguation) =

Shearson was a well-known brand in the financial services industry from 1901 through 1993, related to the following:

== Companies ==
- Shearson Hammill & Co., 1901–1974, an investment banking and brokerage firm founded by Edward Shearson
- Shearson Hayden Stone, 1974–1981, formed through the merger of Shearson, Hamill and Hayden, Stone & Co.
- Shearson/American Express, 1981–1984, formed through the acquisition of Shearson Hayden Stone by American Express
- Shearson Lehman/American Express, 1984–1988, formed through the acquisition of Lehman Brothers Kuhn Loeb
- Shearson Lehman Hutton, 1988–1990, formed through the acquisition of E.F. Hutton & Co.
- Shearson Lehman Brothers, 1990–1993
- Smith Barney Shearson, 1993–1994, formed through the acquisition of Shearson by Primerica in 1993 and merger with its Smith Barney unit, prior to the discontinuation of the Shearson name

== People ==
- Edward Shearson, founder of Shearson
