= Shearson =

Series of investment banking and retail brokerage firms

- Industry: Financial services
- Predecessor: Shearson Hammill & Co.
- Founded: 1902; 124 years ago
- Founder: Edward Shearson
- Fate: Following the spinout of Lehman Brothers, Shearson operations were sold to Primerica, later Citigroup
- Successor: Shearson / American Express; Shearson Lehman / American Express; Shearson Lehman Brothers; Shearson Lehman Hutton; Smith Barney Shearson
- Headquarters: New York, New York, United States
- Services: Investment banking

Shearson was the name of a series of investment banking and retail brokerage firms from 1902 until 1994, named for Edward Shearson and the firm he founded, Shearson Hammill & Co. Among Shearson's most notable incarnations were Shearson / American Express, Shearson Lehman / American Express, Shearson Lehman Brothers, Shearson Lehman Hutton and finally Smith Barney Shearson.

For its first eight decades, the firm operated independently and merged with several Wall Street securities firms including Hayden Stone & Co. and Loeb Rhoades & Co. In 1981, Shearson was acquired by American Express and operated as a subsidiary of the financial services company before being merged with Lehman Brothers Kuhn Loeb in 1984 and E.F. Hutton & Co. in 1988.

In 1993, Shearson was sold to Primerica, a predecessor of Citigroup, and merged with its retail brokerage business, Smith Barney, to create Smith Barney Shearson. The Shearson name was discontinued in 1994.

== History ==
Shearson Lehman Hutton was the result of the combination of several Wall Street firms over a 25-year period beginning in the early 1960s that included Lehman Brothers, Kuhn Loeb, E.F. Hutton, Hayden Stone & Co., Shearson, Hammill & Co., Loeb, Rhoades & Co., Hornblower & Company, and Cogan, Berlind, Weill & Levitt, which ultimately came together under the ownership of American Express.

=== Shearson Hammill & Co. (1902–1974) ===
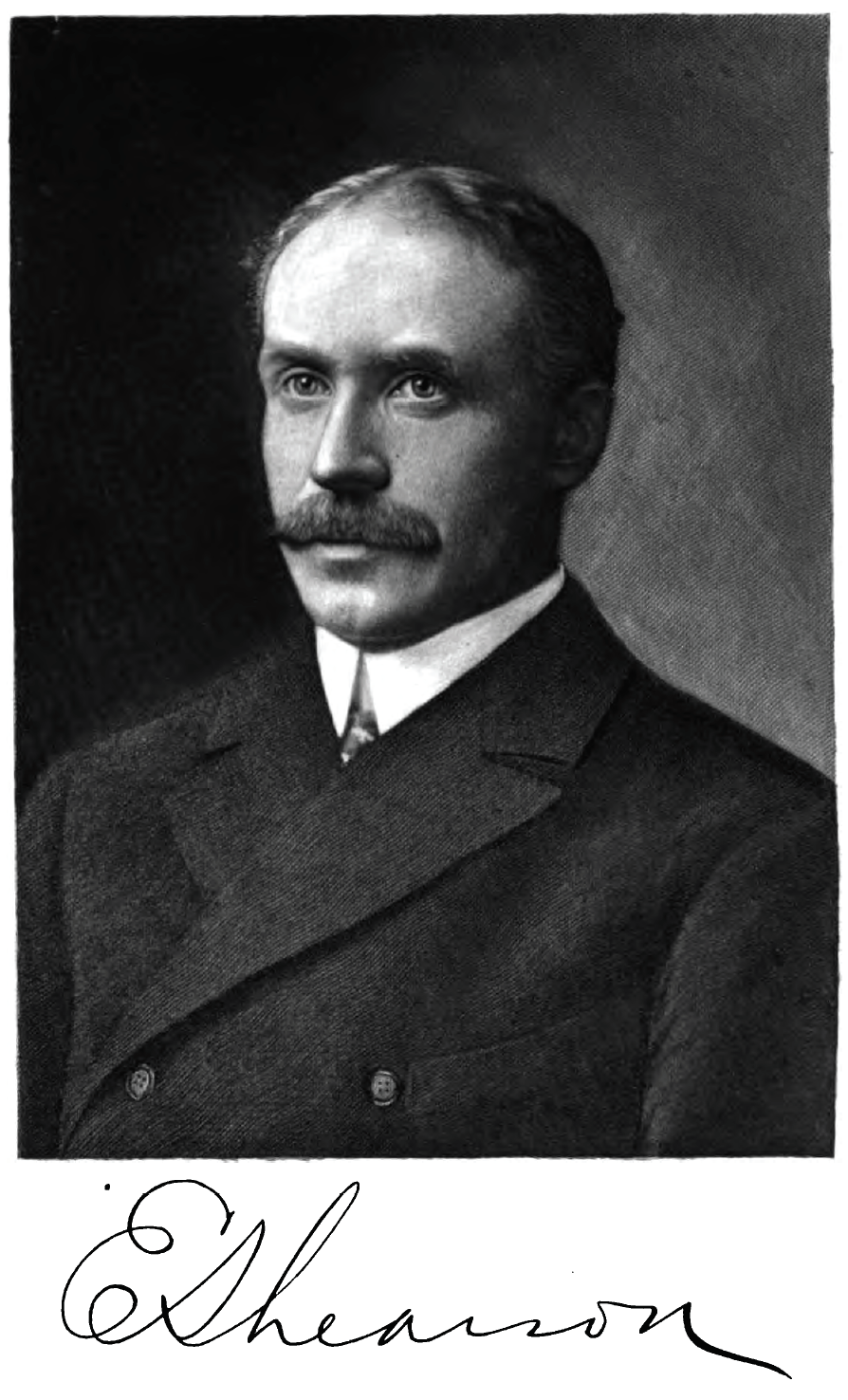
Edward Shearson (c. 1904), founder of Shearson, Hammill & Co.

The Shearson name traces its origins to the formation of Shearson, Hammill & Co., a Wall Street brokerage and investment banking firm founded in 1902 by Edward Shearson and Caleb Wild Hammill. The firm originally built its business as a stock broker, as well as a broker of various commodities, particularly grain and cotton. The firm was a member of the New York Stock Exchange, the Chicago Stock Exchange and the Chicago Mercantile Exchange.

Before forming the firm, Shearson had served as comptroller of U.S. Steel and of Federal Steel Company before that. Shearson, who was raised in Ontario, Canada began his career as an auditor for the Wisconsin Central Railroad before taking a position in the steel industry in 1898. Shearson was an active member of New York society. Hammill, who was raised in Albion, Michigan, moved first to Chicago and subsequently to New York in 1890.

Shearson, Hammill logo c. 1960

The firm was originally headquartered in the Empire Building at 71 Broadway in New York City and maintained another main office in Chicago. By the end of World War I, Shearson Hammill had six branch offices and seven correspondents.

In the 1960s, Shearson, Hammill became well known for its commercials that suggested "If You Want To Know What’s Going On On Wall Street, Ask Shearson Hammill". The firm had 63 offices in the US and internationally supported by a well-regarded securities research department.

=== Shearson Hayden Stone (1974–1979) ===
Shearson logo from 1978

In the early 1970s, Shearson faced financial difficulties as did many of the venerable Wall Street firms in the midst of the 1973–1974 stock market crash. In response to the crisis, Shearson laid off a large portion of its staff in 1973. Meanwhile, through the 1960s and 1970s, Sanford I. Weill, the chairman of the up-and-coming Cogan, Berlind, Weill & Levitt, had been acquiring many of Wall Streets oldest and most venerable investment banking and brokerage firms. By 1973, Weill's firm was known as Hayden Stone, Inc. following CBWL's acquisition of Hayden, Stone & Co. Despite its strong retail brokerage business, Shearson's capital reserves were diminished and, by 1974, it was clear that Shearson did not have sufficient capital to survive as an independent firm, opting to merge with Weill's better capitalized Hayden Stone, Inc. The combined firm was renamed Shearson Hayden Stone, as Weill retained the Shearson brand, which was widely recognized as a major underwriter and brokerage.

=== Shearson Loeb Rhoades (1979–1981) ===
Weill's next major target in 1979 was another prominent investment bank, Loeb, Rhoades, Hornblower & Co., which like Shearson had been suffering financial difficulties and was looking for a potential acquiror. During Mothers Day Weekend in 1979, Shearson and Loeb agreed to an $83 million ($368.2 million today) all-stock merger to form Shearson Loeb Rhoades, with Weill assuming the position of CEO of the combined firm. At the time of the merger, Shearson Loeb Rhoades, with $260 million of combined assets and approximately $550 million of revenue, was among the largest investment banking houses. By most measures, Shearson became the second largest brokerage firm in the U.S. trailing only Merrill Lynch. The merger with Loeb Rhoades was more notable for introducing a stronger investment banking business to Shearson.

=== Shearson/American Express ===
Shearson/American Express logo c. 1982

During the 1980s, American Express embarked on an effort to become a financial services supercompany. In mid-1981, it purchased Sanford I. Weill's Shearson Loeb Rhoades, the second largest securities firm in the United States to form Shearson/American Express. Shearson Loeb Rhoades, itself was the culmination of several mergers in the 1970s as Weill's Hayden Stone, Inc. merged with Shearson, Hammill & Co. in 1974 to form Shearson Hayden Stone. Shearson Hayden Stone then merged with Loeb, Rhoades, Hornblower & Co. (formerly Loeb, Rhoades & Co. and Hornblower & Weeks) to form Shearson Loeb Rhoades in 1979. With capital totalling $250 million at the time of its acquisition, Shearson Loeb Rhoades trailed only Merrill Lynch as the securities brokerage industry's largest firm. After its acquisition by American Express, the firm was renamed Shearson/American Express.

After selling Shearson to American Express, Weill was given the position of president of American Express in 1983. The following year, Weill was named chairman and CEO of American Express's insurance subsidiary, Fireman's Fund Insurance Company. Weill grew increasingly unhappy with responsibilities within American Express and his conflicts with American Express' CEO James D. Robinson III. Weill soon realized that he was not positioned to be named CEO and after the firm's merger with Lehman Brothers Kuhn Loeb, Weill chose to resign from American Express in August 1985. Weill would return to building a large financial services company of his own, which would become Citigroup and would go on to acquire the core Shearson brokerage business that he had built in the 1960s and 1970s.

=== Shearson Lehman Brothers ===
In 1984, American Express acquired the investment banking and trading firm, Lehman Brothers Kuhn Loeb, and added it to the Shearson family, creating Shearson Lehman/American Express.

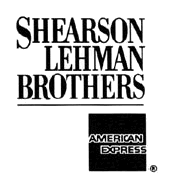
Shearson Lehman logo

Lehman Brothers Kuhn Loeb, which itself was the merger of Lehman Brothers and Kuhn Loeb in 1977 was led by Pete Peterson, a former United States Secretary of Commerce and future founder of the Blackstone Group. However, by the early 1980s, hostilities between the firm's investment bankers and traders, who were driving most of the firm's profits, prompted Peterson to promote Lewis Glucksman, the firm's President, COO and former trader, to be his co-CEO in May 1983. Glucksman introduced a number of changes that had the effect of increasing tensions. Coupled with Glucksman’s management style and a downturn in the markets, these tensions resulted in a power struggle that ousted Peterson and left Glucksman as the sole CEO. Upset bankers who had soured over the power struggle left the company. The company suffered under the disintegration, and Glucksman was pressured into selling the firm. After the merger, Peter A. Cohen was named Chairman and CEO of Shearson Lehman,

During this period, Shearson Lehman was aggressive in building its leveraged finance business in the model of rival Drexel Burnham Lambert. In 1989, Shearson backed F. Ross Johnson's management team in its attempted management buyout of RJR Nabisco but were ultimately outbid by private equity firm Kohlberg Kravis Roberts, who were backed by Drexel.

In 1984, Shearson/American Express purchased the 90-year-old Investors Diversified Services, bringing with it a fleet of financial advisors and investment products.

=== Shearson Lehman Hutton ===
In 1988, Shearson Lehman acquired E.F. Hutton & Co., a brokerage firm founded in 1904 by Edward Francis Hutton and his brother Franklyn Laws Hutton. Under the Hutton brothers and later Robert M. Fomon and the well-known Wall Street trader Gerald M. Loeb, E.F. Hutton became one of the largest brokerage firms in the U.S. Hutton was best known for its commercials in the 1970s and 1980s that used the phrase, "When E. F. Hutton talks, people listen".

Shearson Lehman Hutton logo

In the 1980s, Hutton was caught up in a number of difficulties that ultimately led the firm to seek a buyer. Hutton's most serious trouble came from a check kiting scandal that was uncovered in 1985. Hutton branches were writing checks against accounts at various regional banks and then funding those accounts with checks from yet other banks. This strategy, known as "chaining," gave Hutton the use of money in both accounts until the checks cleared. In effect, Hutton was giving itself a free loan that also did not carry any interest. In early 1987, an internal Hutton probe revealed that brokers at an office in Providence, Rhode Island, laundered money for the Patriarca crime family. Although Hutton reported the investigation to the SEC, it was not enough to stop prosecutors from all but announcing that Hutton would be indicted. This last scandal was uncovered only a week before the 1987 stock market crash. By the end of November 1987, Hutton had lost $76 million, largely due to massive trading losses and margin calls that its customers could not meet.

On December 3, 1987, Hutton agreed to a merger with Shearson Lehman in a $1 billion ($2,833,919,156 today) deal. The merger took effect in 1988, and the merged firm was named Shearson Lehman Hutton, Inc.

Following the merger, dozens of Hutton brokers left the firm to join competitors. At the same time, the combined firm suffered dwindling business from individual investors as its focus was shifted to large corporate transactions. The Hutton brand was used until 1990, when American Express abandoned the name and the business was renamed Shearson Lehman Brothers. Joe Plumeri became the President & Managing Partner of Shearson Lehman Brothers in 1990.

In 1992, Shearson sold the Boston Company, an asset management group, to Mellon Financial. In December 1988, the Boston Company, had disclosed that it had overreported its earnings by $30 million.

=== Sale and spinoff ===
When Harvey Golub became CEO of American Express in 1993, he negotiated the sale of Shearson's retail brokerage and asset management business to Primerica. Primerica's Sanford I. Weill had been the architect of what had become Shearson/American Express in the 1960s and 1970s building up his small firm Cogan, Berlind, Weill & Levitt into one of the largest brokerage firms in the US. The Shearson business was merged with Primerica's Smith Barney to create Smith Barney Shearson. Ultimately, the Shearson name was dropped in 1994.

In 1994, American Express spun off of the remaining investment banking and institutional businesses as Lehman Brothers. In 2008, the bankruptcy of Lehman Brothers ended that firm.

=== The Shearson name over time ===
- Shearson Hammill & Co., 1901–1974, an investment banking and brokerage firm founded by Edward Shearson
- Shearson Hayden Stone, 1974–1979, formed through the merger of Shearson, Hamill and Hayden, Stone & Co.
- Shearson Loeb Rhoades, 1979–1981, formed through the merger of Shearson Hayden Stone and Loeb Rhoades & Co.
- Shearson/American Express, 1981–1984, formed through the acquisition of Shearson Loeb Rhoades by American Express
- Shearson Lehman/American Express, 1984–1988, formed through the acquisition of Lehman Brothers Kuhn Loeb
- Shearson Lehman Hutton, 1988–1990, formed through the acquisition of E.F. Hutton & Co.
- Shearson Lehman Brothers, 1990–1993
- Smith Barney Shearson, 1993–1994, formed through the acquisition of Shearson by Primerica in 1993 and merger with its Smith Barney unit, prior to the discontinuation of the Shearson name

== Acquisition history ==
The following is an illustration of the company's major mergers and acquisitions and historical predecessors (this is not a comprehensive list):

- Smith Barney Shearson (1993, sold to Primerica. Later Smith Barney, today known as Morgan Stanley Smith Barney) Lehman Brothers (1994, spun off; 2008, bankrupt – see Bankruptcy of Lehman Brothers)
  - Shearson Lehman Hutton (merged 1988)
    - Shearson Lehman Brothers (merged 1984)
      - Shearson/American Express (merged 1981)
        - American Express
          (est. 1850)
        - Shearson Loeb Rhoades (acquired 1981)
          - Shearson Hayden Stone (merged 1973)
            - Hayden Stone, Inc. (formerly CBWL-Hayden Stone, merged 1970)
              - Cogan, Berlind, Weill & Levitt
                (formerly Carter, Berlind, Potoma & Weill, est. 1960)
              - Hayden, Stone & Co.
            - Shearson, Hammill & Co.
              (est. 1902)
          - Loeb, Rhoades, Hornblower & Co. (merged 1978)
            - Loeb, Rhoades & Co. (merged 1937)
              - Carl M. Loeb & Co.
                (est. 1931)
              - Rhoades & Company
                (est. 1905)
            - Hornblower, Weeks, Noyes & Trask (merged 1953–1977)
              - Hornblower & Weeks
                (est. 1888)
              - Hemphill, Noyes & Co.
                (est. 1919, acq. 1963)
              - Spencer Trask & Co.
                (est. 1866 as Trask & Brown)
              - Paul H. Davis & Co.
                (est. 1920, acq. 1953)
        - Robinson Humphrey Co. (acq. 1982)
        - Foster & Marshall (acq. 1982)
        - Balcor Co. (acq. 1982)
        - Chiles, Heider & Co. (acq. 1983)
        - Davis, Skaggs & Co. (acq. 1983)
        - Columbia Group (acq. 1984)
        - Financo (founded 1971, acq. 1985)
        - L. Messel & Co. (acq. 1986)
      - Lehman Brothers Kuhn Loeb (merged 1977)
        - Lehman Brothers
          (est. 1850)
        - Kuhn, Loeb & Co.
          (est. 1867)
        - Abraham & Co.
          (est. 1938, acq. 1975)
    - E. F. Hutton & Co.
      (est. 1904)

== Notable former employees ==
- Richard Donchian, commodities and futures trader
- Ray Dalio, Bridgewater founder
- Elaine Garzarelli, stock research analyst credited with predicting the Black Monday stock market crash of 1987
- Stacy Johnson, author and host of Money Talks
- Frederick H. Joseph, former CEO of Drexel Burnham Lambert, co-founder of Morgan Joseph
- Judith Kent (born 1956), business executive and philanthropist
- Joe Plumeri, Citigroup executive, Chairman & CEO of Willis Group Holdings, and owner of the Trenton Thunder
- Peter Schiff (born 1963), stock broker, financial analyst, and author
- Edward Shearson, founder
- Randolph L. Speight
- Sanford I. Weill, CEO of Citigroup who consolidated numerous investment banking firms under the Shearson brand before selling the company to American Express
- Ben Habib, CEO of First Property Group plc

== See also ==
- American Express
- Lehman Brothers
- E. F. Hutton & Co.
- Hayden Stone & Co.
- Shearson, Hammill & Co.
