= The Kudlow Report =

- Genre: Talk show
- Presented by: Lawrence Kudlow
- Country of origin: United States
- Original language: English

Production
- Running time: 60 minutes

Original release
- Network: CNBC
- Release: January 2, 2009 – March 28, 2014

Related
- Kudlow & Company

Kudlow & Company
- Genre: Talk show
- Presented by: Lawrence Kudlow
- Country of origin: United States
- Original language: English

Production
- Running time: 60 minutes

Original release
- Network: CNBC
- Release: February 14, 2005

Related
- The Kudlow Report

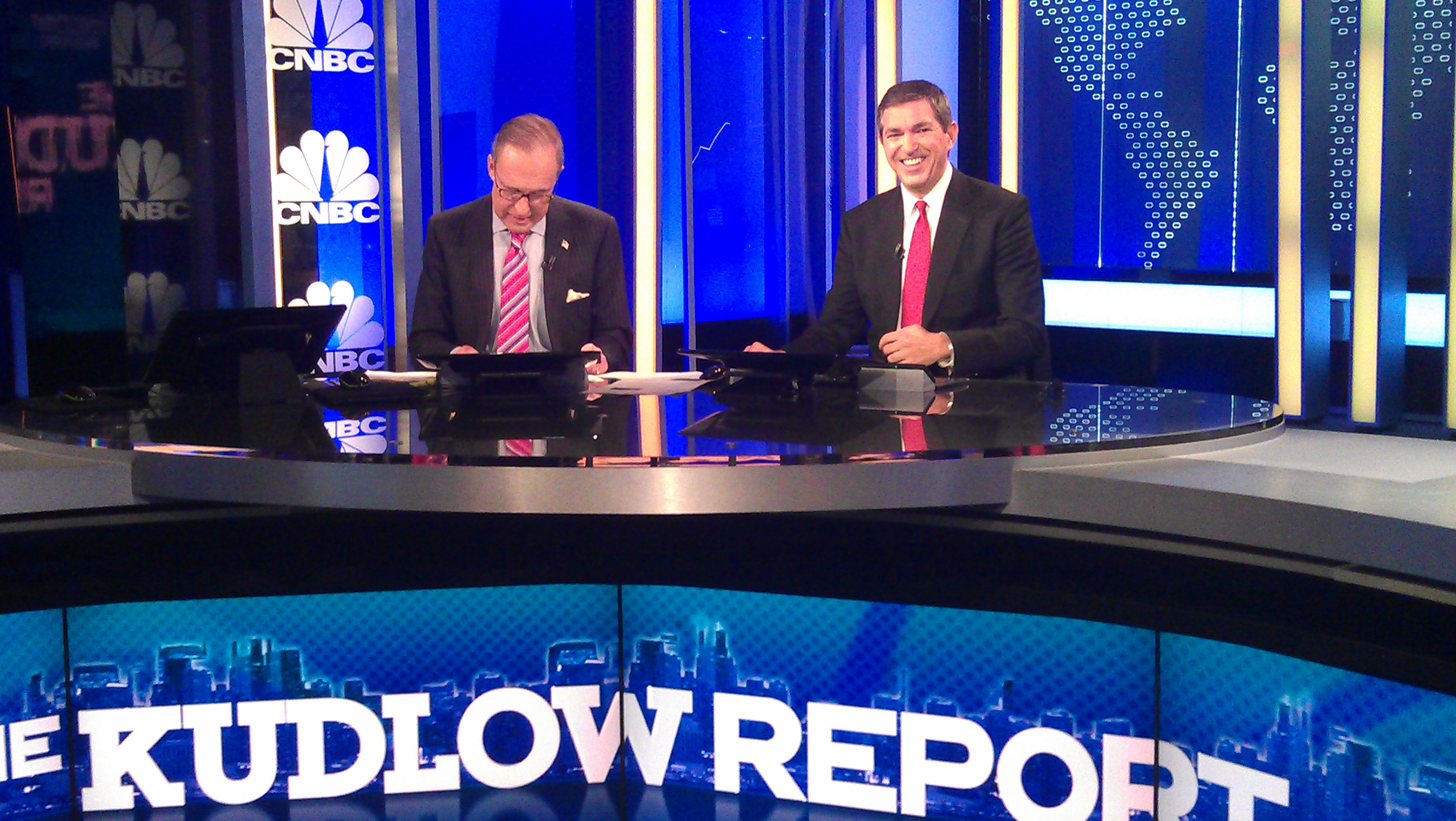
The Kudlow Report set featuring Stavros Lambrinidis

The Kudlow Report was a news television program about business and politics hosted by Larry Kudlow, that aired on the CNBC television channel at 7pm ET until March 28, 2014. The show began airing on January 26, 2009. It was a successor to Kudlow & Company, which aired from 2005 until October 2008. Kudlow & Company was a spinoff of the show Kudlow & Cramer which Kudlow co-hosted from 2002 to 2005. Kudlow & Cramer was called America Now from 2001 to 2002.

Transcripts of Kudlow's comments on the program are available on Kudlow's blog, Kudlow's Money Politic$.

On October 10, 2007, CNBC moved Kudlow & Company from the 5pm ET to the 7pm ET timeslot, being replaced by Fast Money.

During the show's opening, Kudlow recited the "Kudlow creed", summarizing the show's politico-economic inclination: "We believe that free market capitalism is the best path to prosperity!"

On March 7, 2014, CNBC announced that The Kudlow Report would end its run on the network at the end of March 2014. Kudlow then became a senior contributor on the network.

== Segments ==
- View from the Hill: Kudlow usually interviewed a prominent politician or politicians.
- Kudlow's Money Politic$ (same name as Kudlow's blog): Kudlow analyzed the relationship of Washington politics and the economy, especially the stock markets. The transcript of this segment was usually found on his blog.
- Money Makers: Kudlow interviewed a group of analysts, whom he usually introduced as, "[Our] money makers, our all-star know-it-alls. They're here to make you a bundle." A frequent guest was Mike Holland, chairman of Holland and Co., based in Stamford, Connecticut.
- Econ-o-Rama: The guest was usually a well-known economist.

== Notable guests ==
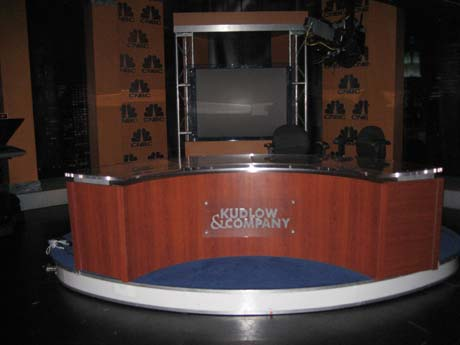
The former Kudlow & Company set

The following prominent guests appeared on the show:

- George W. Bush, President of the United States
- Dick Cheney, Vice President of the United States
- Barry Diller, chairman and CEO of IAC/Interactive and Chairman of Expedia, Inc.
- Chuck Hagel, U.S. Senator from Nebraska
- Henry Kissinger, Former Secretary of State under Presidents Richard Nixon and Gerald Ford
- Bill Richardson, Governor of New Mexico, Former Secretary of Energy
- Charles Schumer, U.S. Senator from New York

The show also featured many recurring guests, including:

- Robert Reich, Former Secretary of Labor under President Bill Clinton
- Ana Marie Cox, the blogger of Wonkette
- John Fund, The Wall Street Journal writer
- Frank Gaffney, Washington Times writer
- Elaine Garzarelli, technical analyst
- Ann Coulter, conservative political columnist/author
- Jagdish Bhagwati, Columbia University professor
- Jeremy Siegel, finance professor at the Wharton School of the University of Pennsylvania
- Ben Stein, Republican Party politician and former speechwriter under President Nixon
- Peter Schiff, investment analyst
- T. Boone Pickens, analyst of crude oil prices
- Arthur Laffer, creator of the Laffer Curve
- Roger G. Ibbotson, Yale School of Management professor

== See also ==
- Kudlow & Cramer
- America Now
