= William O'Neil =

American businessman (1933–2023)

- William O'Neil in 2018
- Born: March 25, 1933; Oklahoma City, Oklahoma, U.S.
- Died: May 28, 2023 (aged 90)
- Education: Southern Methodist University
- Occupations: Businessman; investor
- Years active: 1958–2023
- Known for: Founder of William O'Neil + Co. Incorporated; Founder and chairman of Investor's Business Daily; Founder of O'Neil Data Systems, Inc.

William Joseph O'Neil (March 25, 1933 – May 28, 2023) was an American businessman, stockbroker, and writer. He founded the stock brokerage firm William O'Neil & Co. Inc in 1963 and the financial newspaper Investor's Business Daily in 1984. O'Neil was the author of books like How to Make Money in Stocks, 24 Essential Lessons for Investment Success, and The Successful Investor, and created the CAN SLIM investment strategy.

== Early life and education ==
William Joseph O'Neil was born on March 25, 1933, in Oklahoma City. His parents divorced the next year and his mother took him to Muskogee, where she clerked at a JC Penneys. When he was 14, he moved to Dallas, where he later graduated from Woodrow Wilson High School. He studied business at Southern Methodist University, received a bachelor’s degree in 1955, and served in the United States Air Force.

== Career ==
=== Early career ===
In 1958, O'Neil started his career as a stockbroker at Hayden, Stone & Company, and developed an investment strategy which made early use of computers. In 1960, he was accepted to Harvard Business School's first Program for Management Development (PMD). From his research, O'Neil developed the CAN SLIM strategy and became the top-performing broker in his firm. He bought a seat on the NYSE at age 30 and became the youngest at that time ever to do so. In 1963, he founded William O'Neil + Co. Inc., a company which developed the first computerized daily securities database and sold its research to institutional investors and tracks over 70,000 companies worldwide.

Daily Graphs was launched by William O'Neil to produce Daily Graphs, a printed book of stock charts delivered weekly to subscribers in 1972. In 1998, O'Neil launched Daily Graphs Online as a comprehensive online equity research tool and an extension of the Daily Graphs business he launched in 1972. In 2010, Daily Graphs Inc. rebranded its service as MarketSmith.

In 1973, he founded "O'Neil Data Systems, Inc.", to provide high-speed printing and database-publishing facilities. The company now operates as O'Neil Digital Solutions and has operations in Los Angeles, Dallas and Monroe, North Carolina. The firm provides data-driven publishing and marketing communications.

He offered mutual funds twice in his career: O’Neil Fund in 1965, which saw significant outflows in the downturn at the end of the decade and the New USA fund in 1992, which he left after five years.

=== Investor's Business Daily ===
In 1984, O'Neil made research from his database available in print form with the launch of Investor's Daily, a national business newspaper aimed to compete with The Wall Street Journal. In 1991, the publication's name was changed from Investor's Daily to Investor's Business Daily.

As of 2015, the newspaper had a circulation of 113,000 and its website attracted 2.9 million visitors a month. In 2016, the newspaper changed its printing schedule to weekly, but continued to publish news daily on its website.

In 2021 News Corp. bought Investor’s for $275 million.

== Personal life ==
O'Neil married Fey Seifert in 1952 and had four children. He stated in a 2002 interview that one of the books which was an early influence on him was Gerald Loeb's The Battle for Investment Survival. According to O'Neil, this is the best book on the market. Other investors he studied were Bernard Baruch, Jesse Livermore, Jack Dreyfus, and Nicolas Darvas. He also admired Thomas Edison.

In 2007, O'Neil started donating to his alma mater, Southern Methodist University and funded a chair in business journalism at SMU's Meadows School of the Arts. He then endowed a professorship in markets and freedom and created the William J. O'Neil Center for Global Markets and Freedom at the university's Cox School of Business.

O'Neil died on May 28, 2023, at age 90. After his death, Investor’s Business Daily released a special tribute to O’Neil’s “inspirational life”.

== Bibliography ==
- The Model Book of Greatest Stock Market Winners (1971)
- 24 Essential Lessons for Investment Success, learn the most Important Investment Techniques from the Founder of Investor's Business Daily, McGraw-Hill (2000), ISBN 0-07-136033-6
- The Successful Investor: What 80 Million People Need to Know to Invest Profitably and Avoid Big Losses, 2003, McGraw-Hill, ISBN 0-07-142959-X
- Sports Leaders & Success : 55 Top Sports Leaders & How They Achieved Greatness by Investor's Business Daily (author), William J. O'Neil (introduction) (1st edition, June 1, 2004) ISBN 978-0071441018
- Military and Political Leaders & Success : 55 Top Military and Political Leaders & How They Achieved Greatness, by Investor's Business Daily (author), William J. O'Neil (Introduction) (1st edition, September 1, 2004) ISBN 978-0071440592
- How to Make Money Selling Stocks Short, co-author with Gil Morales, Wiley (December 24, 2004), ISBN 0-471-71049-0
- Business Leaders and Success, 55 Top Business Leaders and How They Achieved Greatness, 2004, McGraw-Hill ISBN 0-07-142680-9
- How to Make Money in Stocks: Desk Diary 2005, Wiley; Spiral edition (September 6, 2004), ISBN 978-0-471-68053-6
- Reminiscences of a Stock Operator (by Edwin Lefèvre), William J. O'Neil (Foreword), Wiley; Illustrate edition (September 2004), ISBN 0-471-67876-7
- How to Make Money in Stocks – A Winning System in Good Times Or Bad, McGraw-Hill, ISBN 978-0-07-161413-9 (4th ed., May 18, 2009)
- The How to Make Money in Stocks Complete Investing System: Your Ultimate Guide to Winning in Good Times and Bad by William J O'Neil (Paperback August 10, 2010) ISBN 978-0-07-176013-3

== See also ==
- Jesse Livermore
- Gerald M. Loeb
