= Plumeri =

Plumeri is a surname. Notable people with the surname include:

- Joe J. Plumeri (born 1943), American businessman
- Terry Plumeri (1944–2016), American musician
