= Charles Hayden =

Charles Hayden may refer to:

- Charles Hayden (banker) (1870–1937), American financier and philanthropist
- Charles T. Hayden (1825–1900), American judge and pioneer
- C. Hayden Coffin (1862–1935), English actor and singer
- J. Charles Haydon (1876–1943), American silent film director, actor and screenwriter
- Charles J. Hayden (mayor) (1816–1888), Mayor of Rochester, New York

== See also ==
- Charles Haden (disambiguation)
