= Nicolas Darvas =

Hungarian dancer, self-taught investor and author

Nicolas Darvas (1920–1977) was a Hungarian dancer, self-taught investor, and author, best known for his book, How I Made $2,000,000 in the Stock Market.

== Career ==
=== Dancer ===
Hungarian by birth, Darvas trained as an economist at the University of Budapest. Reluctant to remain in Hungary until either the Nazis or the Soviet Union took over, he fled in June 1943 at the age of 23 with a forged exit visa and fifty pounds sterling to Istanbul, Turkey. Sometime later, he met up with his half-sister Julia, who became his partner in a dancing team in Europe and the United States.

In April 1953, the two appeared with Judy Garland and Bob Hope. By 1956, they were touring.

=== Investor ===
During his off hours as a dancer, he had read some 200 books on the market and on speculators, sometimes reading up to eight hours a day. He began his studies by reading the following:

- ABC of Investing by R. C. Effinger
- The Stock Market by Dice and Eiteman
- The Securities Market: And How It Works by B. E. Schultz
- Your Investments by Leo Barnes
- Profits in the Stock Market by H. M. Gartley
- Consistent Profits in the Stock Market by Curtis Dahl
- You Can Make Money on the Stock Market by E. J. Mann

The two books which he read almost every week were The Battle for Investment Survival, by Gerald M. Loeb, published in 1935, and Tape Reading and Market Tactics, by Humphrey Bancroft Neill, published in 1931.

Darvas invested in a couple of stocks for which the share price had risen. The stocks continued to rise and he subsequently sold them at a profit. He subsequently came up with an approach and plan for trading stocks from which he received $2,450,000.00 in 18 months, during the 1957–58 bull market, seven years since his first trade.

From the week ending December 16, 1957, through the week ending July 27, 1959, the S&P 500 rose over 53%. Market moves of that size have only happened seven times since 1950, according to Yahoo Finance weekly S&P 500 prices.

His main source of stock selection was from Barron's. The magazine was usually a week-old edition, since he was traveling in his performing dance troupe. He would use cables and telegrams to send his buy and sell stop orders to his broker in New York City. From now on Darvas would select a stock when it made a good advance on strong volume, with favourable fundamental company research.

Darvas claimed his method often revealed signs of insider trading before a company released favorable news to the public.

His stock selection method was called "BOX theory". He considered a stock price wave as a series of boxes. When the stock price was confined in a box, he waited. He bought when the price rose out of the box. He simultaneously set a stop-loss just under this trade price.

At the age of 39, after accumulating his fortune and also being exposed in Time magazine, Darvas documented his actions in the book, How I Made 2,000,000 in the Stock Market. The book describes his "Box System", which he used to buy and sell stocks.

=== Author ===
Darvas is best known for his book, How I Made $2,000,000 in the Stock Market.

==== The Anatomy of Success ====
In his third book, he wrote "Later, I went on to explore and become successful in other fields, the fashion industry, theatrical producing, real estate are just a few". Here he claims "the formula for success remains essentially the same". In the book he set out what he called "the rules to be followed". "But one must know the correct route".

=== 1960 Criminal Investigation ===
Time subsequently reported that the New York Attorney General had "thrown the book" at Darvas, charging that his story was "unqualifiedly false" and that it could find ascertainable profits of only $216,000. The action was the first to be taken under a broadened state law that banned fraud or misrepresentation in giving investment advice.

In a follow up, dated January 13, 1961, Time reported that the probe was blocked by the court, which ruled that the investigation by Attorney General Louis J. Lefkowitz was an "unwarranted invasion of the free press". Time also reported that state investigators admitted that they had not been able to track down all of the dancer's brokerage accounts.

Darvas called the charges false, a "cynically irresponsible action, book burning by publicity". He stated, "I keep out in a bear market and leave such exceptional stocks to those who don't mind risking their money against the market trend".

Darvas claimed to have never sold short. He said in 1977, "I have never done it myself because psychologically I am not cut out for short selling. But I think markets have now changed their character so much that all experienced investors should seriously consider it. It is not for the proverbial widows and orphans, though."

== Death ==
Darvas died in Paris, France in 1977.

== Books ==
- How I Made $2,000,000 in the Stock Market. Published in 1960 (hardcover). Available in French (softcover)

Chapter 1 – Canadian Period. Chapter 2 – Entering Wall Street. Chapter 3 – My First Crisis. Chapter 4 – Developing the Box Theory. Chapter 5 – Cables Round the World. Chapter 6 – During the Baby-Bear Market. Chapter 7 – The Theory Starts to Work. Chapter 8 – My First Half-Million. Chapter 9 – My Second Crisis. Chapter 10 – Two Million Dollars. Appendix – Interview With Time Magazine

- Wall Street: The Other Las Vegas. Published in 1964 (hardcover).

Chapter 1 – The Casino Chapter. 2 – The Dealers. Chapter 3 – The Croupiers. Chapter 4 – The Touts. Chapter 5 – Personal Protection : Hedging My Bets. Chapter 6 – Playing in the Casino – My Buying Game. Chapter 7 – Playing in the Casino – My Selling Game. Chapter 8 – Figuring My Winnings Appendix – Index of Stocks.

- The Anatomy of Success. Published in 1965 (hardcover).
- The Darvas System for Over-The-Counter Profits. Published in 1971 (hardcover).
- You Can Still Make It in the Market. Published in 1977 (hardcover) Republished on August 20, 2008; ISBN 0-9820556-7-6, ISBN 978-0-9820556-7-0 In his last book, Darvas gives the rules for a method called "Dar-Card".

== Books referencing Darvas ==
- How To Make Money In Stocks: A Winning System In Good Times And Bad, by William J. O'Neil (1988)
- How I Made Money Using the Nicolas Darvas System, by Steve Burns (August 17, 2010)
- Lessons from the Greatest Stock Traders of All Time, by John Boik (May 21, 2004)
- How Legendary Traders Made Millions, by John Boik (March 23, 2006)
- Mastering the Trade by John F. Carter (December 7, 2005)
- New York City Vaudeville (NY) (Images of America), by Anthony Slide (July 26, 2006)
- How to Make the Stock Market Make Money for You, by Ted Warren (Dec 1994)
- The Best: TradingMarkets.com Conversations With Top Traders, by Kevin N Marder (September 15, 2000)
- The Transformation of Wall Street: A History of the Securities and Exchange Commission and Modern Corporate Finance, by Joel Seligman (June 26, 2003)
- Protecting Your Wealth in Good Times and Bad, by Richard A. Ferri (April 18, 2003)
- Sixties Going on Seventies (Perspectives on the Sixties), by Nora Sayre (May 1996)
- The Astute Investor (Second Edition), by Eric L. Prentis (March 27, 2006)
- The Perfect Speculator, by Brad Koteshwar (June 30, 2005)
- Swing Trading for Dummies, by Omar Bassal (2008)

== See also ==
- William J. O'Neil
- Jesse Livermore
