= John Reeve (businessman) =

- Known for: CEO of Willis Group Holdings (1995–2000)
- Predecessor: Roger Elliott
- Successor: Joe Plumeri

John Reeve is a former Executive Chairman and chief executive officer of Willis Group Holdings.

== Business career ==
Reeve worked for The British Aluminum Company plc., and then was a Group Finance Director of Mercantile House Holdings plc. He then joined Sun Life Corporation plc in 1988, and was a managing director there from April 1988 to October 1995.

Reeve joined Willis on 1 November 1995 as Executive Chairman-elect. He succeeded Roger Elliott as Executive Chairman on 1 December 1995.

During his tenure as Willis CEO, in the Fall of 1988 the company was purchased by Trinity Acquisition P.L.C., a consortium of investors (including five insurers) led by U.S. private equity firm Kohlberg Kravis Roberts. At that time, Willis was known as Willis Corroon Group Ltd.

In 2000, Reed retired at the end of his five-year employment contract. He was succeeded at Willis by Joe Plumeri.

In December 2004 it was announced that the insurer AMP was to be renamed Pearl, and that Reeve would chair the new company.
