= Hayden, Stone & Co. =

New York securities firm founded in 1892

- Company type: Acquired
- Industry: Financial services
- Founded: 1892
- Founder: Charles Hayden; Galen L. Stone
- Defunct: 1979
- Fate: Acquired in 1979 by Loeb, Rhoades, Hornblower & Co.
- Successor: Shearson Hayden Stone, Shearson/American Express
- Headquarters: New York City, United States
- Products: Investment banking, Brokerage

Hayden, Stone & Co. was a major American securities firm founded in 1892 by Charles Hayden and Galen L. Stone. The firm was acquired by Cogan, Berlind, Weill & Levitt in 1972 and, after its name disappeared in 1979, was part of what would become Shearson/American Express in 1981.

== History ==
In 1892, Clark, Ward, & Co. clerks Charles Hayden (later the benefactor of the Hayden Planetarium) and Galen L. Stone opened a new brokerage house, Hayden, Stone & Co. While Stone was known for remaining silent, Hayden gained a reputation for quick decisions and mastery of the brokerage business. Foreseeing the needs of electrification, Hayden made his fortune by investing in copper mining. The new investment firm prospered, expanding from its Boston base to open a New York City branch in 1906.

CBWL logo

In 1970, the prestigious Hayden, Stone found itself in financial trouble along with many other large securities firms. Hayden, Stone was acquired by Cogan, Berlind, Weill & Levitt (often jokingly referred to as Corned Beef With Lettuce), whose partners included Sandy Weill and Arthur Levitt, and renamed itself CBWL-Hayden, Stone, dropping the CBWL from the name just two years later, allowing Weill to rid himself of the Corned Beef With Lettuce moniker.

The new Hayden Stone, Inc. then completed possibly its most significant acquisition to that point, merging with Shearson, Hammill & Co. Once again, Weill chose to adopt the target's branding to become Shearson Hayden Stone. The Hayden Stone name was finally abandoned in 1979, following the acquisition of Loeb, Rhoades, Hornblower & Co. to form Shearson Loeb Rhoades. Just two years later, in 1981, Weill sold the combined company to American Express to form Shearson/American Express.

At one point, the firm was considered to be the third largest "wire-house" in the country behind only Merrill Lynch and Bache & Co.

== Acquisition history ==
The following is an illustration of the company's major mergers and acquisitions and historical predecessors (this is not a comprehensive list):

- Shearson Lehman Hutton (merged 1988)
  - Shearson Lehman Brothers (merged 1984)
    - Shearson/American Express (merged 1981)
      - American Express
        (est. 1850)
      - Shearson Loeb Rhoades (acquired 1981)
        - Shearson Hayden Stone (merged 1973)
          - Hayden Stone, Inc. (formerly CBWL-Hayden Stone, merged 1970)
            - Cogan, Berlind, Weill & Levitt
              (formerly Carter, Berlind, Potoma & Weill, est. 1960)
            - Hayden, Stone & Co.
          - Shearson, Hammill & Co.
            (est. 1902)
        - Loeb, Rhoades, Hornblower & Co. (merged 1978)
          - Loeb, Rhoades & Co. (merged 1937)
            - Carl M. Loeb & Co.
              (est. 1931)
            - Rhoades & Company
              (est. 1905)
          - Hornblower, Weeks, Noyes & Trask (merged 1953-1977)
            - Hornblower & Weeks
              (est. 1888)
            - Hemphill, Noyes & Co.
              (est. 1919, acq. 1963)
            - Spencer Trask & Co.
              (est. 1866 as Trask & Brown)
            - Paul H. Davis & Co.
              (est. 1920, acq. 1953)
    - Lehman Brothers Kuhn Loeb (merged 1977)
      - Lehman Brothers
        (est. 1850)
      - Kuhn, Loeb & Co.
        (est. 1867)
      - Abraham & Co.
        (est. 1938, acq. 1975)
  - E. F. Hutton & Co.
    (est. 1904)

== Notable alumni ==
- Peter A. Cohen, former CEO of Shearson Lehman Hutton and current CEO of the Cowen Group
- Richard Donchian, commodities and futures trader, and pioneer in the field of managed futures
- Charles Hayden, founder
- Amos Hostetter Sr., noted trader and co-founder of Commodities Corporation
- Joseph P. Kennedy Sr., businessman and political figure, patriarch of the Kennedy family
- William O'Neil, American entrepreneur, stockbroker and writer, who founded the business newspaper Investor's Business Daily
- Joe Plumeri, Citigroup executive and CEO of the Willis Group
- Arthur Rock, venture capitalist
- Samuel Howard Sloan
- Galen L. Stone, founder
- Lou Stone, broker, father of Oliver Stone, director of Wall Street, among others
- Frank G. Zarb, former energy czar under Gerald Ford and former chairman of NASDAQ

== See also ==
- Wilko v. Swan
