= Charles Haden =

Charles Haden may refer to:

- Charlie Haden (1937–2014), American jazz musician
- Charles Harold Haden II (1937–2004), United States federal judge
- Charles Thomas Haden, father of Sir Francis Seymour Haden
- Charles Haden, fictional character portrayed by Jack Huston in Miss Austen Regrets
- Charles-Haden Savage, fictional character portrayed by Steve Martin in Only Murders in the Building

== See also ==
- Charles Hayden (disambiguation)
