= Investor's Business Daily =

Financial research newspaper in Los Angeles, California

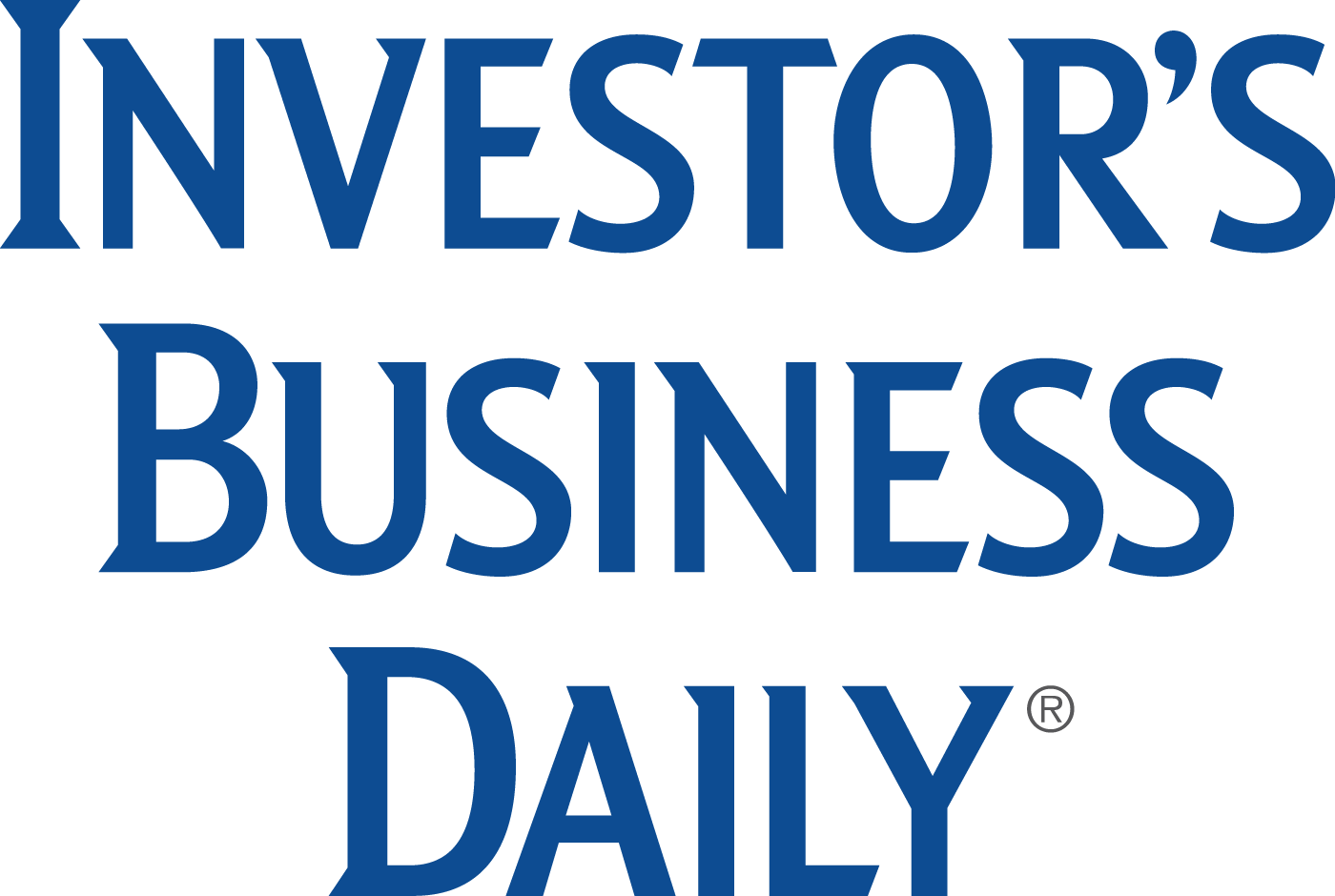
- Type: Financial research
- Owner: News Corp via Dow Jones & Company
- Founder: William O'Neil
- President: Dan Shar
- Founded: 1984; 42 years ago (as Investor's Daily)
- Headquarters: Los Angeles, California
- ISSN: 1061-2890
- Website: investors.com

Investor's Business Daily (IBD) is an American newspaper and website covering the stock market, international business, finance, and economics. Founded in 1984 by William O'Neil as a print newspaper, it is owned by News Corp and headquartered in Los Angeles, California. Holding a right-leaning editorial stance, IBD provides news and analysis on stocks, mutual funds, exchange-traded funds, commodities, and other financial instruments aimed at individual investors and financial professionals. It also provides tools for financial literacy. The publication focuses on “The IBD Methodology,” an investment strategy developed by O'Neil.

Every Monday in its weekly edition, the publication publishes the components of The IBD 50 Index, a list of 50 growth stocks that are most attractive based on earnings, stock price performance, and other criteria used in The IBD Methodology. It is the basis for an exchange-traded fund (ETF) called the Innovator IBD 50 ETF (Ticker: FFTY), which is also rebalanced weekly.

IBD Live includes a virtual stock market discussion featuring professional stock traders.

== History ==
Entrepreneur and stockbroker William O'Neil founded the newspaper in 1984 due to frustration with the lack of data about stocks in newspapers.

In September 1991, the publication's name was changed from Investor's Daily to Investor's Business Daily.

In 1994, ten years after its founding, IBD was ranked among the fastest-growing newspapers in the country.

In 2001, after the September 11 attacks, revenue fell 20%-30%. At that time, paid circulation was approximately 313,000.

In 2005, political cartoonist Michael Ramirez joined IBD. In 2008, Ramirez won his second Pulitzer Prize for editorial cartooning while at the company.

In March 2016, the print newspaper became a weekly publication and the publication shifted its focus to daily digital operations, cutting 20 jobs. At that time, the website had 4 million visitors.

During the 2016 United States presidential election, IBD conducted one of two polls that correctly predicted a victory by Donald Trump. Before the election, the poll had been dismissed as being an "outlying survey," but it was rated as one of the closest to the final result.

In March 2019, the publication ended its opinion section.

In May 2021, News Corp acquired the publication for $275 million, adding it to its Dow Jones & Company division. At that time it had 100,000 digital subscribers.

== IBD/TIPP polls ==
TechnoMetrica Institute of Policy and Politics (TIPP), the polling arm of TechnoMetrica Market Intelligence, is IBD's exclusive polling partner delivering poll data via the IBD/TIPP collaboration between Investor's Business Daily and TechnoMetrica Institute of Policy and Politics. TIPP polls have mixed reviews, some claiming that it is most accurate and some claiming that it has a right wing bias.

== Controversies ==
=== Lawsuit claiming inadequate wages to telemarketers ===
In March 2002, telemarketers who were compensated on the basis of a point system which rewarded them for selling longer subscriptions, winning daily contests, and meeting weekly sales goals sued the company for violations of the Fair Labor Standards Act of 1938.

=== July 2009 error in editorial ===
In July 2009, an editorial in the publication claimed that physicist Stephen Hawking "wouldn't have a chance in the U.K., where the [British] National Health Service (NHS) would say the life of this brilliant man, because of his physical handicaps, is essentially worthless." Hawking was British, lived in the United Kingdom nearly all of his life, and received his medical care from the NHS. IBD later removed the editorial's reference to Hawking in its online version and appended an "Editor's Note" which said, "This version corrects the original editorial which implied that physicist Stephen Hawking, a professor at the University of Cambridge, did not live in the UK." Hawking himself responded, "I wouldn't be here today if it were not for the NHS. I have received a large amount of high-quality treatment without which I would not have survived."
