= Galen L. Stone =

American financier

- Born: November 21, 1862; Leominster, Massachusetts, U.S.
- Died: December 26, 1926 (aged 64); Brookline, Massachusetts, U.S.
- Occupations: Financier and philanthropist
- Spouse: Carrie Morton Gregg (m. 1889)

Galen Luther Stone (November 21, 1862 – December 26, 1926) was an American financier and philanthropist.

== Early life ==
Stone was born in Leominster, Massachusetts. In his teens, he worked as an office clerk in Boston, Massachusetts.

== Career ==
He became financial editor of the Boston Advertiser in his 20s. Together with Charles Hayden, he founded the stock brokerage firms of Hayden, Stone & Co. and Haystone Securities Corporation of Boston and New York City. In 1919, his firm hired fellow Bostonian Joseph P. Kennedy.

Stone held financial interests in numerous companies and was president of the Atlantic Gulf and West Indies Steamship Company, and in 1900 he and his associates formed the Eastern Steamship Lines He was chairman of the Pond Creek Coal Company, and the Pike County, Kentucky, mining town of Stone was named in his honor.

== Personal life ==
In 1889, he married Carrie Morton Gregg (1866–1945) of Boston, and the couple eventually made their home in Brookline, Massachusetts. An avid yachtsman, in his later years, Stone owned the 188-foot (57.3 m) yacht Arcadia.

== Later life and recognition ==
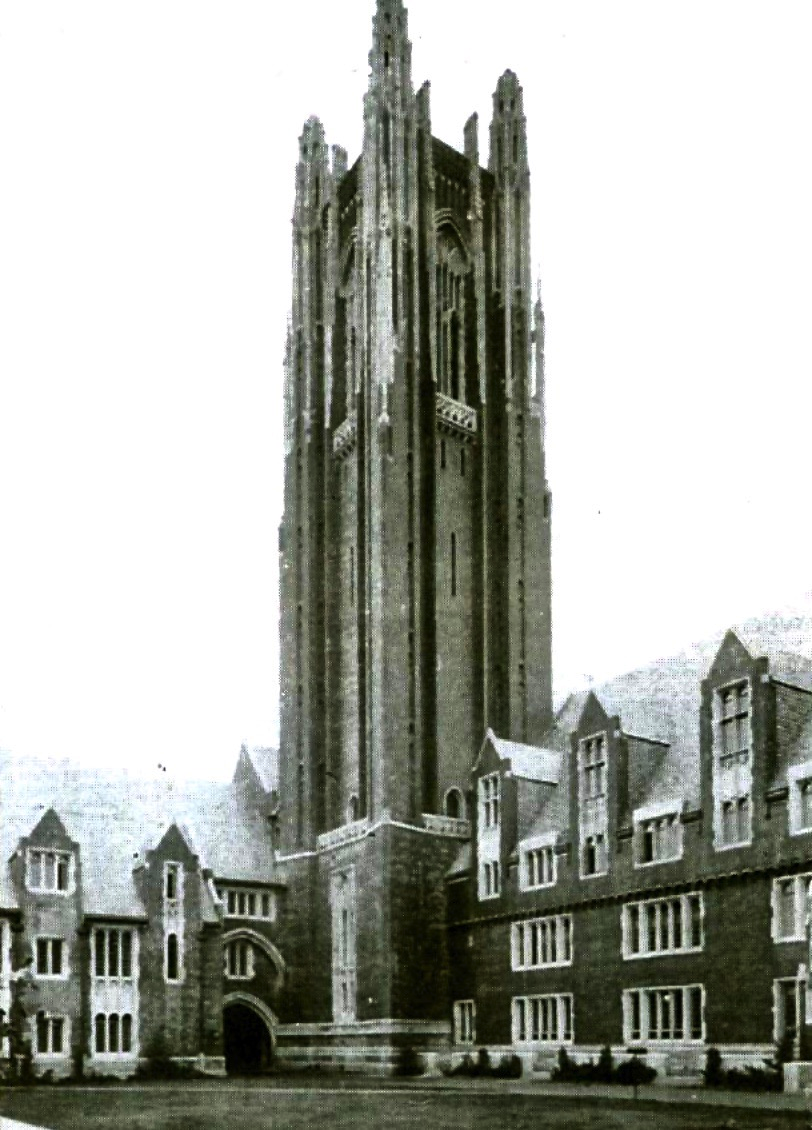
Galen Stone Tower

Stone used his fortune for a number of charitable causes, many of which centered on the arts and education. In 1915, through the fundraising efforts of the educator Charlotte Hawkins Brown, he became aware of Palmer Memorial Institute, an African-American preparatory school in Sedalia, North Carolina. Stone became the institute's largest benefactor. Also, his philanthropic work was recognized with the creation of the Galen Stone Professor of International Trade chair at the Harvard University Institute for International Development. A trustee of Wellesley College from 1915 to 1925, he donated the funds to build the Galen Stone Tower at Green Hall. The 182-foot (55.5 m) high tower is a focal point on the campus and houses the 32-bell carillon which is actively played by a student guild of carillonneurs for major College events as well as between and after classes. He was once vice-president of the trustees of the Boston Symphony Orchestra.

Stone was honored for his philanthropy by initiation as an honorary member of the Phi Mu Alpha Sinfonia fraternity in 1917 at the New England Conservatory of Music in Boston. The fraternity's mission reflects Stone's values by developing young men to share their talents to create harmony in the world.

Galen Stone died of heart failure at his home in Brookline in 1926.

A World War II Liberty ship, SS Galen L. Stone, was named in Stone's honor.

Stone's grandson, also Galen Luther Stone, served as United States Ambassador to Cyprus.
