= Carole Brookins =

American executive director (1943–2020)

Carole Brookins (August 16, 1943 – March 23, 2020) was an American executive director of the World Bank and an expert on the global political economy.

Brookins attended the University of Oklahoma, graduating in 1965, and entered Wall Street in the early 1970s after being hired by EF Hutton, then one of the United States' largest stock brokerages. In 1980, she founded a company named World Perspectives, which focused on agricultural market analysis. Beginning in 1984, Brookins was given several roles in government. The first was as the chairman of the US Department of State's Advisory Committee on Food, Hunger & Agriculture in Developing Countries. Six years later, George H. W. Bush nominated her for the President's Export Council. Finally, George W. Bush appointed her as an executive director of and a US representative in the World Bank. Brookins held this role from 2001 to 2005. Brookins was also a member of the Council on Foreign Relations for life.

Brookins died on March 23, 2020, in Palm Beach, Florida, of COVID-19 during the COVID-19 pandemic in Florida. She was 76 years old.
