= Edward Shearson =

American banker

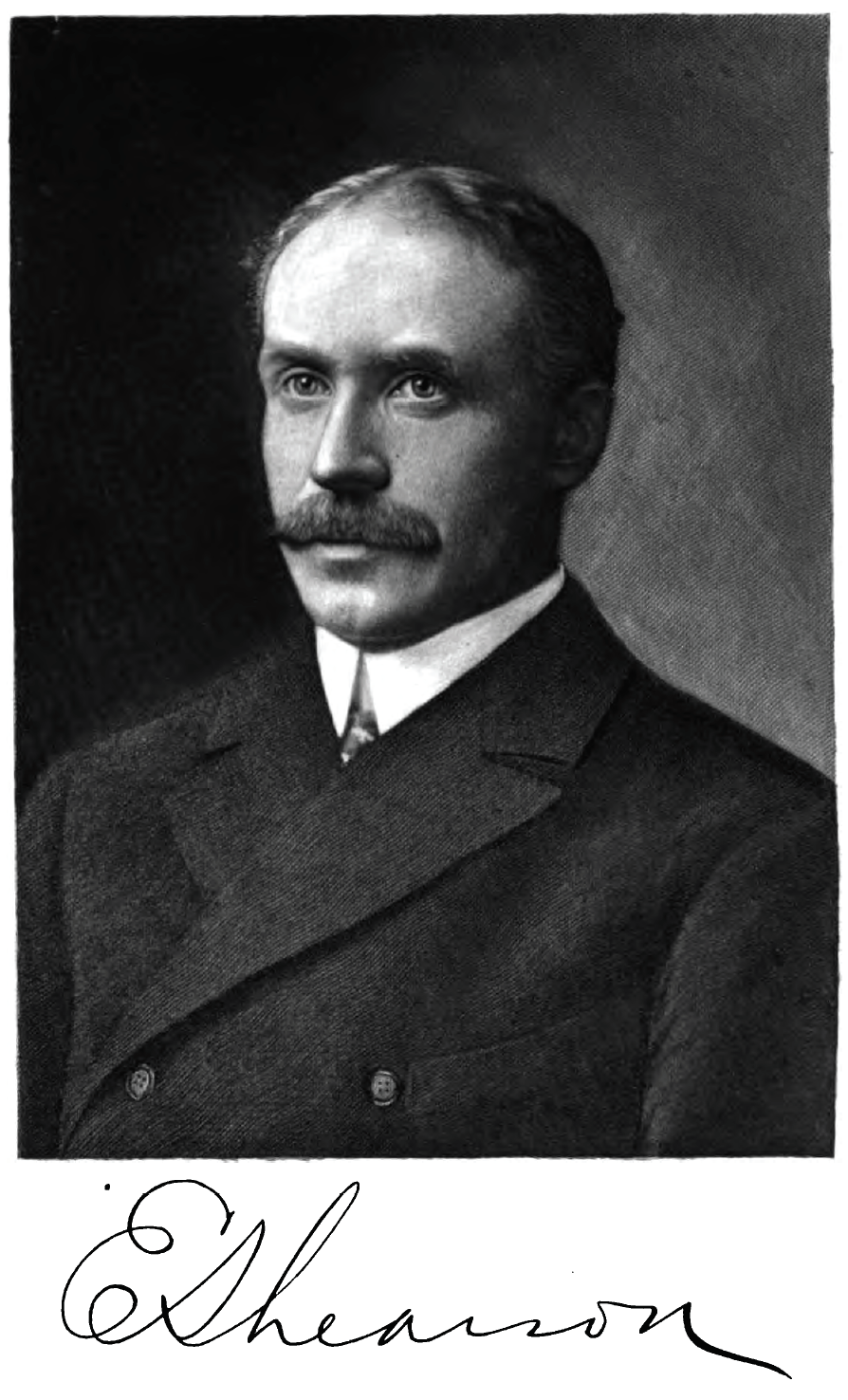
- Edward Shearson (c. 1904), founder of Shearson, Hammill & Co.
- Born: August 3, 1864; Galt, Canada
- Died: October 30, 1950 (aged 86)
- Occupations: Banker, accountant and stockbroker
- Known for: Founder of Shearson, Hammill & Co.
- Spouse: Flora Josephine Shea (m. 1903)

Edward Shearson (August 3, 1864 - October 30, 1950) was an American banker and millionaire who was the founder of Shearson, Hammill & Co., which was among the largest brokerage and investment banking firms in the United States during his lifetime.

== Early years ==
Shearson was born in Galt, in Canada West on August 3, 1864 to William A. and Marion W. Shearson. At the age of 17, he left school to pursue work. Shearson traveled West and took up farming and stock-raising for a brief time.

== Career ==
At 19, he was an office boy for the Accounting Department of the Chicago and Northwestern Railroad. Shearson advanced through the company, occupying several positions, until he relocated to Milwaukee in 1887. There, he served as chief clerk of the Accounts Department of the Wisconsin Central Railroad. After a year, he was promoted to Auditor of Disbursements. In 1890, Shearson returned to Chicago, where he eventually retired from railroad service and entered the steel industry in 1898. Before forming Shearson, Hammill & Co. with Caleb Wild Hammill in 1902, Shearson had served as comptroller of U.S. Steel and of Federal Steel Company. Shearson was also an active member of New York society.

Shearson, Hammill merged with Hayden, Stone & Co. in 1974 and the combined firm was named Shearson Hayden Stone, retaining Shearson's name, which was widely recognized as a major underwriter and brokerage.

The Shearson name was finally abandoned in 1994 following Primerica's acquisition of Shearson from American Express. Although initially Primerica had intended to brand its retail brokerage business as Smith Barney Shearson, the Shearson name was dropped.

== Personal life ==
Shearson married Flora Josephine Shea on November 14, 1903. The couple resided on the Upper East Side of Manhattan and kept a house in Greenwich, Connecticut.

He died on October 30, 1950.

== See also ==
- Shearson, Hammill & Co.
- Shearson Lehman Hutton
