= Gstock =

GStock
- Company type: Private
- Industry: Finance
- Founded: 2006
- Defunct: Dec 2014
- Website: www.gstock.com

GStock was a distributed computing project formed in 2006 for stock market analysis. It was enabled by users that volunteered to download and run a software client and donate some idle capacity of their computer processing unit (CPU). The gathered computing power was used to search for an investment strategy that historically worked best for each individual stock.

== Information ==
GStock applied technical analysis models in its calculations. The investment strategies found to work best for each stock produced periodic BUY and SELL trading signals. These signals were publicly available on the GStock.com website along with past statistics and charts with the BUY and SELL signals plotted on them for visual comparison by users.

GStock scanned over 1 billion investments strategies on over 4,000 US publicly traded stocks.

== See also ==
- Parallel computing
- Grid computing
