= Randolph L. Speight =

American jurist and director of the Pioneer Fund

Randolph L. Speight (August 31, 1919 – February `9, 1999) was an American jurist and director of the Pioneer Fund.

He was a partner at Shearson, Hammill & Co. He also worked at Brown, Harris, Stevens. A resident of Smith's Parish, Bermuda after retirement, he died suddenly in Mexico.
