= CAN SLIM =

Stock investment strategy

CAN SLIM is an acronym developed by the American investor William O'Neil, intended to represent the seven characteristics that top-performing stocks often share before making their biggest price gains.

The method was named the top-performing investment strategy from 1998-2009 by the American Association of Individual Investors. In 2015, Innovator IBD 50 exchange-traded fund was launched focusing on the companies listed on the IBD 50, a computer-generated list published by Investors Business Daily that highlights stocks based on the CAN SLIM investment criteria.

== Acronym ==
The seven parts of the acronym are as follows:

- C stands for current quarterly earnings. Per share, current earnings should be up at least 25% in the most recent financial quarter, compared to the same quarter the previous year. Additionally, if earnings are accelerating in recent quarters, this is a positive prognostic sign.
- A stands for annual earnings growth, which should be up 25% or more over the last three years. Annual returns on equity should be 17% or more
- N stands for new product or service, which refers to the idea that a company should have continuing development and innovation. This is what allows the stock to emerge from a proper chart pattern and achieve a new price.
- S stands for supply and demand. A gauge of a stock's demand can be seen in the trading volume of the stock, particularly during price increases.
- L stands for leader or laggard? O'Neil suggests buying "the leading stock in a leading industry." This somewhat qualitative measurement can be more objectively measured by the relative price strength rating of the stock, designed to measure the price performance of a stock over the past 12 months in comparison to the rest of the market based on the S&P 500 (or the S&P/TSX Composite Index for Canadian stock listings) over a set period of time.
- I stands for institutional sponsorship, which refers to the ownership of the stock by mutual funds, banks and other large institutions, particularly in recent quarters. A quantitative measure here is the accumulation/distribution rating, which is a gauge of institutional activity in a particular stock.
- M stands for market direction, which is categorized into three - market in confirmed uptrend, market uptrend under pressure, and market in correction. The S&P 500 and NASDAQ are studied to determine the market direction. During the time of investment, O'Neil prefers investing during times of definite uptrends of these indexes, as three out of four stocks tend to follow the general market direction.

== Investing mechanism and process ==
CAN SLIM is a growth stock investing strategy formulated from a study of stock market winners dating back to 1953 in the book How to Make Money in Stocks: A Winning System In Good Times or Bad. This strategy involves implementation of both technical analysis and fundamental analysis.

The objective of the strategy is to discover leading stocks before they make major price advances. These pre-advance periods are "buy points" for stocks as they emerge from price consolidation areas (or "bases"), most often in the form of a "cup-with-handle" chart pattern, of at least 7 weeks on weekly price charts.

The strategy is one that strongly encourages cutting all losses at no more than 7% or 8% below the buy point, with no exceptions, to minimize losses and to preserve gains. It is stated in the book, that buying stocks of solid companies should generally lessen chances of having to cut losses, since a strong company (good current quarterly earnings-per-share growth, annual growth rate, and other strong fundamentals) will usually shoot up—in bull markets—rather than descend. Some investors have criticized the strategy when they didn't use the stop-loss criterion; O'Neil has replied that you have to use the whole strategy and not just the parts you like.

O'Neil has stated that the CANSLIM strategy is not momentum investing, but that the system identifies companies with strong fundamentals—big sales and earnings increases which is a result of unique new products or services—and encourages buying their stock when they emerge from price consolidation periods (or "bases") and before they advance dramatically in price. O'Neil's two forays into mutual funds ended quickly and with lackluster returns.

== See also ==
- Dow Jones Industrial Average
- Growth stock
- Investment strategy
- New York Stock Exchange
- Stock market
- Value investing
