= Stone, Kentucky =

Unincorporated community in Kentucky, United States

Stone
- Unincorporated community
- Location within the state of Kentucky Stone (the United States)
- Coordinates: 37°35′9″N 82°16′16″W
- Country: United States
- State: Kentucky
- County: Pike
- Elevation: 784 ft (239 m)
- Time zone: UTC-6 (Central (CST))
  - Summer (DST): UTC-5 (CST)
- ZIP code: 41567
- Area code: 606
- GNIS feature ID: 504444

Stone is an unincorporated community and coal town in Pike County, Kentucky, United States. It was established in 1912. Stone was a mining community named for Galen Stone, head of the Pond Creek Coal Company which was based in Stone. In 1922 the Pond Creek Coal Company was sold to Fordson Coal Company, which was a subsidiary of Ford Motor Company. In 1936 Fordson sold the mine at Stone to Eastern Coal Company.

Stone is located just across the Tug Fork from Williamson, West Virginia, upstream from Belfry, Kentucky, on Pond Creek.
