= Shearson, Hammill & Co. =

- Company type: Private partnership
- Industry: Financial services
- Founded: 1902
- Founder: Edward Shearson
- Defunct: 1974
- Fate: Acquired in 1974 by Hayden, Stone & Co.
- Successor: Shearson Hayden Stone, Shearson/American Express (1981)
- Headquarters: New York, New York, United States
- Products: Investment banking, Brokerage

Shearson, Hammill & Co. was a Wall Street brokerage and investment banking firm founded in 1902 by Edward Shearson and Caleb Wild Hammill. The firm originally built its business as a stock broker as well as a broker of various commodities, particularly grain and cotton. The firm was a member of the New York Stock Exchange, the Chicago Stock Exchange and the Chicago Mercantile Exchange.

The firm was originally headquartered in the Empire Building at 71 Broadway in New York City and maintained another main office in Chicago.

Shearson was acquired in 1974 by Hayden Stone & Co. to form Shearson Hayden Stone.

== History ==
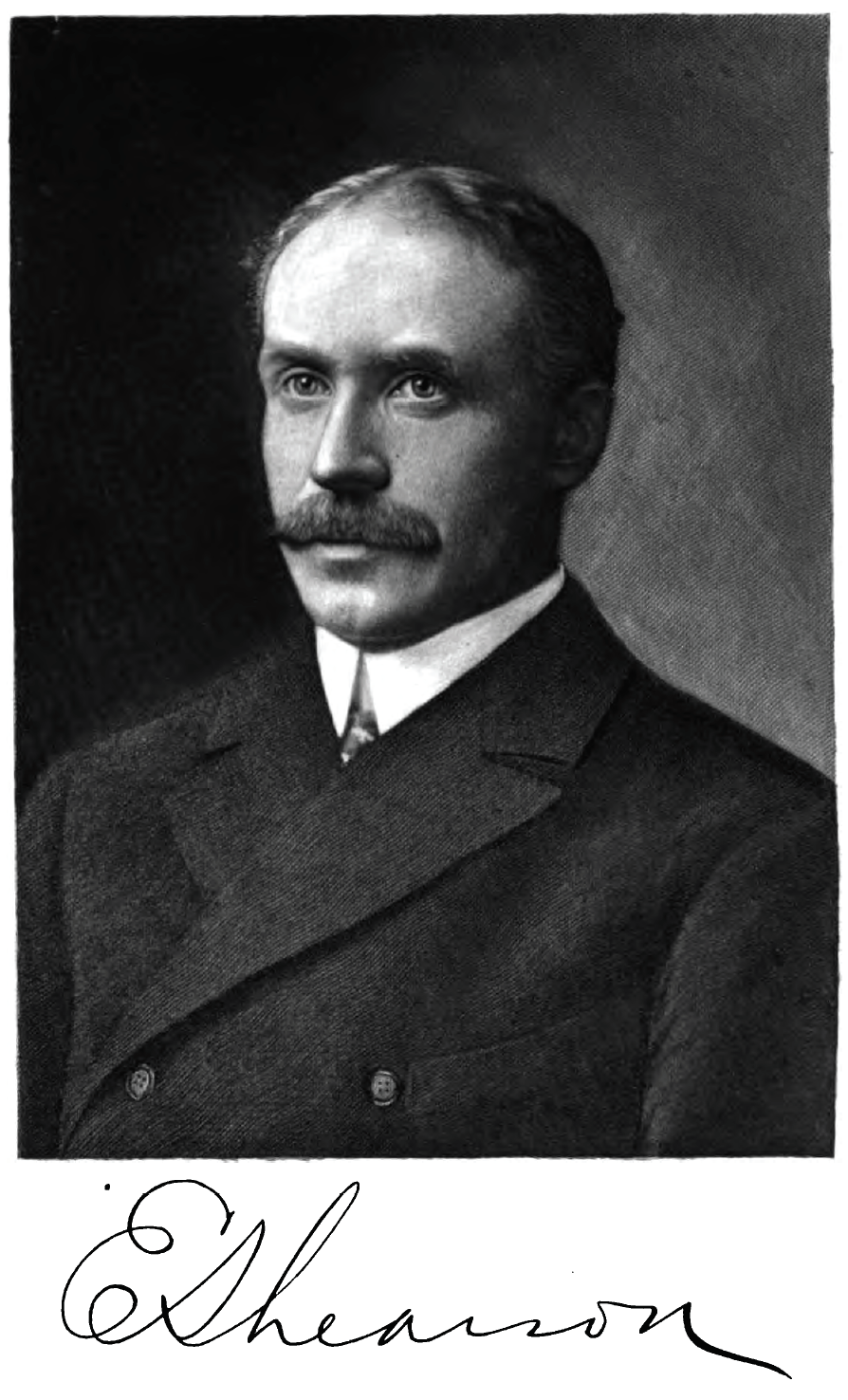
Edward Shearson (c. 1904), founder of Shearson, Hammill & Co.

Shearson, Hammill & Co. was founded by Edward Shearson and Caleb Wild Hammill in 1902. Before forming the firm, Shearson had served as comptroller of U.S. Steel and of Federal Steel Company before that. Shearson, who was raised in Ontario, Canada began his career as an auditor for the Wisconsin Central Railroad before taking a position in the steel industry in 1898. Shearson was an active member of New York society. Hammill, who was raised in Albion, Michigan, moved first to Chicago and subsequently to New York in 1890.

By the end of World War I, Shearson Hammill had six branch offices and seven correspondents.

In the 1960s Shearson, Hammill became well known for its commercials that suggested "If You Want To Know What’s Going On On Wall Street, Ask Shearson Hammill." The firm had 63 offices in the US and internationally supported by a well-regarded securities research department.

Shearson logo from 1978

In the early 1970s, Shearson faced financial difficulties as did many of the venerable Wall Street firms in the midst of the 1973–1974 stock market crash. In response to the crisis, Shearson laid off a large portion of its staff in 1973. Meanwhile, through the 1960s and 1970s, Sanford I. Weill, the chairman of the up-and-coming Cogan, Berlind, Weill & Levitt, had been acquiring many of Wall Streets oldest and most venerable investment banking and brokerage firms. By 1973, Weill's firm was known as Hayden Stone, Inc. following the acquisition of Hayden, Stone & Co. Despite its strong retail brokerage business, Shearson's capital reserves were diminished and by 1974, it was clear that Shearson did not have sufficient capital to survive as an independent firm, opting to merge with Weill's better capitalized Hayden Stone, Inc. The combined firm was renamed Shearson Hayden Stone, as Weill retained the Shearson brand, which was widely recognized as a major underwriter and brokerage.

Weill's next major target in 1979 was another prominent investment bank, Loeb, Rhoades, Hornblower & Co., which like Shearson had been suffering financial difficulties and was looking for a potential acquiror. During Mothers Day Weekend 1979, Shearson and Loeb agreed to an $83 million all-stock merger to form Shearson Loeb Rhoades, with Weill assuming the position of CEO of the combined firm. At the time of the merger, Shearson Loeb Rhoades, with $260 million of combined assets and approximately $550 million of revenue, was among the largest investment banking houses. By most measures, Shearson became the second largest brokerage firm in the U.S. after Merrill Lynch. The merger with Loeb Rhoades was notable for introducing a stronger investment banking business to Shearson.

In 1981, Weill sold the combined Shearson Loeb Rhoades to American Express to form Shearson/American Express. In 1984, American Express would acquire the investment banking and trading firm, Lehman Brothers Kuhn Loeb, and added it to the Shearson family, creating Shearson Lehman/American Express.

The Shearson name was finally abandoned in 1994 following Primerica's acquisition of Shearson from American Express. Although initially Primerica had intended to brand its retail brokerage business as Smith Barney Shearson, the Shearson name was dropped.

== Acquisition history ==
The following is an illustration of the company's major mergers and acquisitions and historical predecessors (this is not a comprehensive list):

- Shearson Lehman Hutton (merged 1988)
  - Shearson Lehman Brothers (merged 1984)
    - Shearson/American Express (merged 1981)
      - American Express
        (est. 1850)
      - Shearson Loeb Rhoades (acquired 1981)
        - Shearson Hayden Stone (merged 1973)
          - Hayden Stone, Inc. (formerly CBWL-Hayden Stone, merged 1970)
            - Cogan, Berlind, Weill & Levitt
              (formerly Carter, Berlind, Potoma & Weill, est. 1960)
            - Hayden, Stone & Co.
          - Shearson, Hammill & Co.
            (est. 1902)
        - Loeb, Rhoades, Hornblower & Co. (merged 1978)
          - Loeb, Rhoades & Co. (merged 1937)
            - Carl M. Loeb & Co.
              (est. 1931)
            - Rhoades & Company
              (est. 1905)
          - Hornblower, Weeks, Noyes & Trask (merged 1953-1977)
            - Hornblower & Weeks
              (est. 1888)
            - Hemphill, Noyes & Co.
              (est. 1919, acq. 1963)
            - Spencer Trask & Co.
              (est. 1866 as Trask & Brown)
            - Paul H. Davis & Co.
              (est. 1920, acq. 1953)
    - Lehman Brothers Kuhn Loeb (merged 1977)
      - Lehman Brothers
        (est. 1850)
      - Kuhn, Loeb & Co.
        (est. 1867)
      - Abraham & Co.
        (est. 1938, acq. 1975)
  - E. F. Hutton & Co.
    (est. 1904)

== See also ==
- Shearson Lehman Hutton
- Hayden, Stone & Co.
- Edward Shearson
