= Charles Hayden (banker) =

American banker, businessman, financier and philanthropist

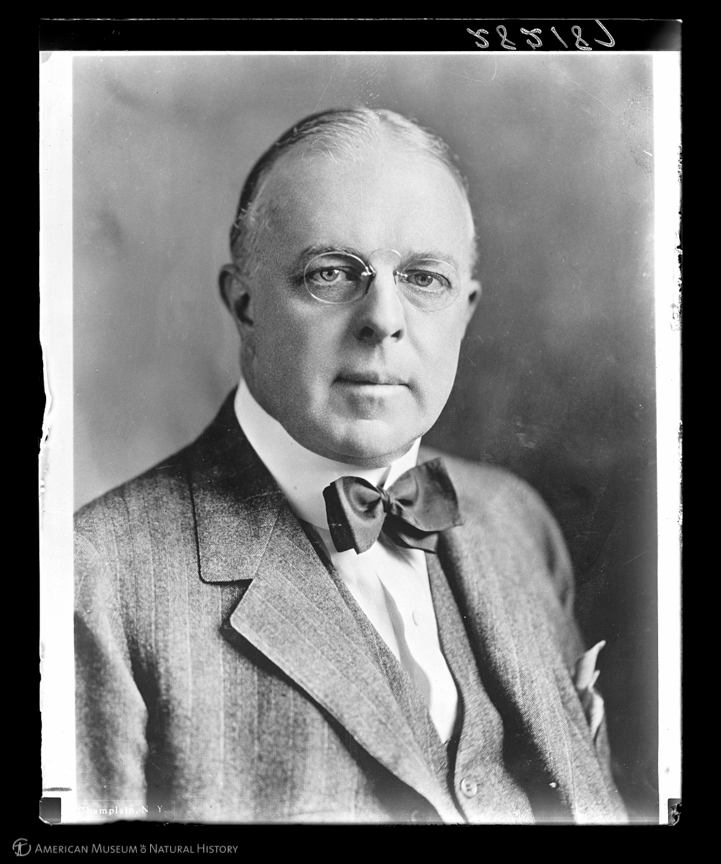
- Photo of Hayden in 1934
- Born: July 8, 1870; Boston, Massachusetts, U.S.
- Died: January 8, 1937 (aged 66); New York City, U.S.
- Education: Massachusetts Institute of Technology
- Known for: Copper mining investment and brokerage

Charles Hayden (July 8, 1870 – January 8, 1937) was an American banker, businessman, financier and philanthropist. He was the senior partner of Hayden, Stone & Co. and his influence was such that James W. Gerard listed him among those "who are too busy to hold political office, but determine who shall." Instrumental in the financing of Arizona copper mines and smelters, the smelting community of Hayden, Arizona, was named for him.

== Background ==
Hayden was born in Boston, Massachusetts, to Josiah Willard Hayden and Emma A. (Tirrill) Hayden. His father was a shoe and leather merchant and he was educated in the public schools before enrolling at the Massachusetts Institute of Technology. Hayden studied mining investment and graduated in 1890. Following graduation, he traveled for a year before taking a position as clerk with the Boston bank of Clark, Ward, & Co.

Hayden was a bachelor his entire life and lived at the Savoy-Plaza Hotel in Manhattan. His hobbies included steeplechase and bridge.

== Career ==
In 1892, Hayden joined with fellow Clark, Ward, & Co. clerk Galen L. Stone to open Hayden, Stone & Co. Hayden gained a reputation for quick decisions and mastery of the brokerage business. Foreseeing the needs of electrification, Hayden made his fortune by investing in copper mining. The new investment firm prospered, expanding from its Boston base to open a New York City branch in 1906.

In addition to his brokerage firm, Hayden was involved in other business operations. During his lifetime he was appointed director to 89 companies, and held 58 directorships at the time of his death. He developed the Utah, Chino, Ray, and Nevada Consolidated copper companies, and was instrumental in their later merger into the Kennecott Copper Company. He was chairman of the International Nickel Company and the Hotel Waldorf-Astoria Corporation, amongst others.

== Philanthropy ==
Hayden was involved with philanthropy most of his life. During the First World War, he donated US$100,000 per year to the American Red Cross. He later became interested in helping youth and in 1926 was revealed to have anonymously donated US$100,000 to establish an uptown New York City branch of the Boys Club. This was followed in 1933 when, at the request of President Franklin D. Roosevelt, Hayden chaired the Boy Scout Maintenance Fund for the Boy Scouts of America.

In addition to youth, Hayden routinely donated to aid the poor. In 1934, he donated US$150,000 to New York's American Museum of Natural History for creation of a planetarium which was named after him. This was followed the next year when he headed a committee which raised $9,440,000 to save New York's charitable hospitals. He was also a member of the corporation of the Massachusetts Institute of Technology.

Noted contributions bearing his name include the Hayden Planetarium in New York, the Charles Hayden Planetarium at Boston's Museum of Science, and the Charles Hayden Foundation.

=== Charles Hayden Foundation ===
Hayden's largest philanthropic effort came following his death on January 8, 1937, when his will directed roughly US$50,000,000 ($1.12 billion in today's dollars) from his estate be used to create a foundation to advance the education and "moral, mental, and physical well-being" of boys and young men. The Charles Hayden Foundation makes grants of between US$10,000,000 and US$20,000,000 annually to support programs for children in the Boston and New York metropolitan areas. The Foundation has also funded the construction of the Charles Hayden Library of humanities and science at Hayden's alma mater MIT, and dormitories named Hayden Hall at Stevens Institute of Technology in Hoboken, New Jersey, and the New York University School of Law in New York City.
