= Caleb Wild Hammill =

American businessman

Caleb Wild Hammill (1863–1921) was one of the founders of the stockbrokerage and banking investment firm of Shearson, Hammill & Co., founded in 1902 by Hammill and Edward Shearson. It was in existence from 1902 to 1974 under that original name.

Hammill was born in Chicago, Illinois, and raised in Albion, Michigan, the ancestral town of his grandmother and great-grandparents. His parents were Caleb Wild & Elizabeth (Pine) Hammill. Hammill married Maude Echols of Fort Smith, Arkansas, in 1903.

Hammill died in Paris, France, on July 19, 1921. He is interred in Woodland Cemetery in the Bronx, New York.
