= Elaine Garzarelli =

American financial analyst

Elaine M. Garzarelli (born 1950 or 1951) is an American financial analyst.

== Biography ==
Garzarelli was born in Pennsylvania, United States, North America.

Garzarelli received her undergraduate degree from the Drexel Institute of Technology in 1969. She went on to receive her doctorate from the same institution, now known as Drexel University, in 1977.

=== Black Monday call ===
While working as a stock analyst at Shearson Lehman, she became known for predicting Black Monday, the stock market crash of 1987. As indicated in the Wall Street Journal article on October 28, 1987, “Ms. Garzarelli, a research analyst and money manager for Shearson Lehman Brothers, Inc., turned bearish on Sept. 9. By Oct. 12, when she appeared on Cable News Network’s “Money Line” program, she was fiercely bearish, predicting an imminent collapse in the stock market. She gave USA Today a similarly dire forecast the next day.”

Despite her success, she expressed discomfort with being put on a pedestal as a seer with a crystal ball:

"I felt awkward because I got so much attention. A few weeks after that I made a negative comment, and the market dropped 120 points that day. The Wall Street Journal wrote that I had moved the stock market, and I was very uncomfortable. My career was going very nicely until then, and it was too much attention. It was a lot of pressure."

Garzarelli's fund, Smith Barney Shearson Sector Analysis, was established just before the crash. Thanks to all the free publicity she got from being interviewed as a prognosticator, investors soon poured $700 million into this fund. In 1988, Garzarelli's fund was the worst-performing fund among growth stock funds. From 1988 to 1990, Garzarelli's fund underperformed the S&P 500 average by about 43 percent. Even the few investors who were in her fund before the crash in 1987 (when Garzarelli's fund outperformed the S&P 500 by about 26 percent) still lost. What she saved her investors by avoiding the crash she lost back (and then some) in the years that followed.

Since then, her record has been mixed. For instance, on July 23, 1996, she told clients that U.S. stocks could fall 15% to 20% from peaks reached earlier in the summer. The Dow Jones Industrial Average closed that day at 5,346.55--and had risen 45% by Nov 1997.

=== Garzarelli Research ===
Garzarelli was a partner and managing director at several major brokerage firms until 1995 when she founded her own business, Garzarelli Research, Inc.. For eleven years she had been ranked as Wall Street's top Quantitative Analyst in Institutional Investor magazine's poll.

In the spring of 2003, shortly before the inflation adjusted S&P 500 fell, she predicted "a stock market stuck in a holding pattern for years".
