= EF Hutton =

American stock brokerage firm

- Industry: Financial services
- Founded: 1904; 122 years ago (original firm); 1988 (acquired by Shearson Lehman Brothers to form Shearson Lehman Hutton); 2012 (revived as EF Hutton America, Inc.); 2021 (revived as EF Hutton, rebranding for Kingswood Capital Markets)
- Founder: Edward Francis Hutton
- Fate: 2012 (revived); 2019; 7 years ago (suspended operations); 2021 (revived as new name for Kingswood Capital Markets)
- Headquarters: New York, New York
- Key people: Gerald M. Loeb (former chairman), Peter V. Ueberroth (former director); Robert M. Fomon (former chairman & CEO), Christopher Daniels (former president and CEO); Joseph Rallo (CEO); Duncan Swanston (president)
- Website: efhuttongroup.com

EF Hutton was an American stock brokerage firm founded in 1904 by Edward Francis Hutton and his brother, Franklyn Laws Hutton. Later, it was led by well-known Wall Street trader Gerald M. Loeb. Under their leadership, EF Hutton became the second largest brokerage firm in the United States.

== History ==
=== Founding through the 1970s ===
E.F. Hutton & Co. was founded in San Francisco in 1904 by eponym Edward Francis Hutton and his brother, Franklyn Laws Hutton. EF Hutton was one of the first brokerages to open offices in California. In 1906, two years after the firm was founded, its offices were destroyed in the San Francisco earthquake of 1906. In 1924, famed Wall Street trader Gerald M. Loeb joined the firm, ultimately rising to chairman. The firm developed a nationwide retail brokerage network to market its debt and equity securities. It also operated seasonal offices in Palm Beach, Florida (winter) and Saratoga Springs, New York (summer) to cater to its customers. Morrie Cohen opened Hutton's first one-man office on Maui in December 1969.

Edward F. Hutton, an entrepreneur who later also became chairman of the General Foods Corporation and for years wrote a newspaper column that appeared in The New York Herald Tribune and approximately 60 other newspapers, led the firm until his death in 1962. In 1970, Robert M. Fomon was appointed Hutton's Chief Executive Officer. In the early 1970's the firm hired Carole Brookins, making her one of the few women stockbrokers on the Chicago futures exchange floors at the time. Despite the failure or takeover of many of its peers in the 1960s and 1970s, Hutton retained its independence under Fomon's leadership. By the early 1980s, the original E.F. Hutton & Co. had become the principal component of what grew into a group of companies owned by E.F. Hutton Group Inc., listed on the New York Stock Exchange. Other subsidiaries of that Delaware-chartered holding company were E.F. Hutton Trust Company (now "Smith Barney Corporate Trust Company" and owned by Citigroup), E.F. Hutton Life Insurance Company, and E.F. Hutton Bank. The Hutton companies also managed many mutual funds and other investment vehicles, some of which were separately incorporated and/or registered, and participated actively in corporate mergers and public offerings of securities. In 1976, Western Union partnered with E. F. Hutton & Co.

=== 1980s check scandal ===
In 1980, several Hutton branches began writing checks which were greater than the cash they had on hand at the bank, then making a deposit in another bank equal to the amount it wrote at the first bank. This strategy, known as "chaining," is a form of check kiting. "Chaining" gave Hutton the use of money in both accounts until the checks cleared. In effect, Hutton was giving itself an illegal "free loan" that also did not carry any interest. Thomas Morley, who was in charge of getting the firm to better manage its cash, wrote a memo to Hutton's president, George Ball, saying that this practice netted one branch an extra $30,000 per month. Ball sent the memo out across Hutton's network of regional sales managers, with the note, "A point well remembered—and acted on." Over the years, Hutton shuffled money in this manner between 400 banks (mostly small rural banks), gaining the use of an estimated $250 million a day without paying a penny in interest. Whenever something was amiss, Hutton questioned the bank's procedures.

The scheme worked for almost three years until officials at the Genesee County Bank in Leroy, New York, discovered that the large deposits made by Hutton's four-person office there were far more than the office's banking requirements. They also discovered that the checks Hutton was using to make the deposits were drawn on two Pennsylvania banks. When Genesee officials learned that Hutton did not have enough money in the Pennsylvania bank accounts to cover the checks, they stopped honoring Hutton checks. One of the banks involved, United Penn Bank (now part of Citizens Financial Group), asked the Federal Deposit Insurance Corporation to investigate. In 1984, the matter was forwarded to the United States Attorney for the Middle District of Pennsylvania, who opened a federal criminal probe.

The United States Postal Inspection Service's Harrisburg, Pennsylvania office in 1982 also began investigating. Hutton retained Tom Curnin, a respected defense attorney who was inclined to fight the government. However, in February 1985, Curnin discovered a memo from a Hutton regional vice president for the Washington, D.C., area which stated that his offices drew on "bogus deposits". The memo—tantamount to a smoking gun—led Curnin to change tactics and begin negotiations for a plea agreement. In the spring of 1985, Curnin told Hutton's board that it faced two choices: plead guilty to a massive list of felonies or face a trial that would likely see three senior Hutton executives convicted and drive Hutton out of business. Curnin advised settling with the government to avoid years of bad publicity.

On May 2, Hutton agreed to plead guilty to 2,000 counts of mail and wire fraud, as well as pay a $2 million fine plus $750,000 for the cost of the investigation. This is equivalent to approximately $5.1 million and $1.9 million, respectively, in 2025. Hutton also agreed to pay $8 million in restitution—the estimated extra income earned from the fraud. This is equivalent to approximately $20.3 million in 2025. In return, Curnin wrung two major concessions. First, no Hutton executives would be prosecuted (even though the government determined that 25 senior officers masterminded the scheme). Second, the Securities and Exchange Commission allowed Hutton to stay in business; offenses of this magnitude usually result in an individual or firm being permanently barred from the securities industry.

An internal review conducted by former Attorney General Griffin Bell concluded that the scam occurred due to inadequate internal controls. For example, no one admitted to being Morley's immediate supervisor. However, a wide perception that Hutton had not been punished enough (for example, The New York Times' William Safire claimed that the $2.75 million fine amounted to "putting a parking ticket on the Brink's getaway car"), led several customers to pull their accounts with Hutton, and many of the firm's star performers fled to other firms. Several public agencies also took their business elsewhere. Although Fomon was not implicated in the scandal, the board fired him in 1987.

=== 1987 market crash and 1990s mergers ===
In early 1987, an internal probe revealed that brokers at an office in Providence, Rhode Island, laundered money for the Patriarca crime family. Although Hutton reported the investigation to the SEC, it was not enough to stop prosecutors from all but announcing that Hutton would be indicted.

In a case of especially bad timing, this came only a week before the 1987 stock market crash. By the end of November, Hutton had lost $76 million, largely due to massive trading losses and margin calls that its customers could not meet. It also had its commercial paper rating cut from A-2 to A-3, effectively losing $1.3 million in financing. Hutton was now weeks—perhaps days, according to some board members—from collapse. On December 3, Hutton agreed to a merger with Shearson Lehman/American Express. The merger took effect in 1988 and the merged firm was named Shearson Lehman Hutton, Inc.

It later emerged that Hutton had faced massive cash shortages as early as 1985, and the firm's management had tried to put it up for sale as early as 1986.

Following the merger, dozens of Hutton brokers left the firm to join competitors. At the same time, the combined firm suffered dwindling business from individual investors as its focus was shifted to large corporate transactions. The Hutton brand was used until 1990, when American Express abandoned the name and the business was renamed Shearson Lehman Brothers. Joe Plumeri became the President & Managing Partner of Shearson Lehman Brothers in 1990.

In 1992, Shearson sold The Boston Company, an asset management group, to Mellon Financial. In December 1988, the Boston Company had disclosed that it had overreported its earnings by $30 million.

In 1993, American Express sold its brokerage and asset management business—the Shearson and Hutton parts of Shearson Lehman Hutton—to Primerica for $1 billion. Primerica merged them with Smith Barney (which it had bought in 1987) to form Smith Barney Shearson, later shortened back to simply Smith Barney. As a result of several mergers throughout the 1990s, the remains of the original E.F. Hutton became part of Citigroup, and Morgan Stanley Wealth Management in 2007, a joint venture between Morgan Stanley and Citigroup.

=== Revival as EFH Group ===
As a result of the Subprime mortgage crisis, Citigroup was forced to sell assets. A group of E.F. Hutton alumni reportedly bought the E.F. Hutton brand for an undisclosed amount. In 2012, a group of EF Hutton alumni led by Frank Campanale announced plans to launch a new financial advisory firm under the name E.F. Hutton & Company, but Campanale left in October 2013 to become chairman and chief executive of Lebenthal Wealth Advisors LLC and the effort was abandoned.

In 2014, a new group, led by Christopher Daniels, who had started his career at EF Hutton's investment bank, re-launched as EFH Group Inc. Daniels had been president of Ascend, a structured finance firm, and before that, he had worked for Raymond James in capital markets. EFH Group changed the brand’s stylization from E.F. Hutton to EF Hutton.

Stanley Hutton Rumbough, grandson of Edward Francis Hutton the founder of EF Hutton, served as non-executive Chairman of the Board. EFH Group went public In November 2014, via a reverse merger with OTC-traded Twentyfour/seven Ventures, Inc. and was renamed EF Hutton America, Inc. trading under the stock symbol HUTN. In 2016 the company headquarters were relocated to One Main Street in Springfield, Ohio, and in October 2017 the firm name was changed to HUTN, Inc.

HUTN aimed to apply the power of social media platforms and technology to deliver an improved, customer-centric approach to financial services. It embarked on an ambitious software and platform development program but was under-capitalized. By late 2018 it had accumulated $14 million in debt and had pledged its office building and the rights to the EF Hutton brand as collateral.

CEO Christopher Daniels, who was also the majority shareholder with over 92% of the voting rights, resigned in April 2019 after several attempted debt restructurings were unsuccessful due to the magnitude of the company's debts and the over-leveraged position of its assets. HUTN "ceased normal operations" and the board agreed to accept a loan from its chairman Stanley Hutton Rumbough to provide interim funding to the company as it began the process of dissolution and wind-down.

=== 2021 revival ===
The EF Hutton name was once again revived in 2021 as EF Hutton Group, the rebranding for Kingswood Capital Markets, an affiliate of Kingswood Holdings Ltd. and Benchmark Investments LLC. The investment bank acquired the EF Hutton name because of the “incredible legacy of this powerhouse firm that was once synonymous with Wall Street,” said Chief Executive Officer Joseph T. Rallo.

Unlike the Campanale and Daniels start-up efforts, the new EF Hutton Group is already a successful firm. Since its founding in May 2020, the former Kingswood Capital Markets has experienced significant growth, raising over $2 billion in capital for its clients in the first 8 months of 2021, and over $3 billion in the last twelve months.

The EF Hutton Group management team also plans to launch a series of SPACs under the EF Hutton brand. The first EF Hutton SPAC, led by CEO Ben Piggott and co-presidents Rallo and Boral, is set to raise about $150 million and will target the U.S. consumer technology sector. Stanley Hutton Rumbough, grandson of Edward Francis Hutton, has the option to invest in and join the board of the firm’s first four special purpose acquisition companies, according to people with knowledge of the matter. EF Hutton’s blank-check companies are yet to publicly file paperwork with the Securities and Exchange Commission.
