= Gerald M. Loeb =

American stock trader (1899–1974)

- Born: Gerald Martin Loeb; July 24, 1899; San Francisco
- Died: April 13, 1974 (aged 74)
- Occupations: Stockbroker, Investment banker
- Years active: 1921–1974
- Employer: E.F. Hutton & Co.
- Known for: Wall Street Trader, author

Gerald Martin Loeb (July 24, 1899 – April 13, 1974) was a founding partner of E.F. Hutton & Co., a renowned Wall Street trading and brokerage firm. He was the author of the books The Battle For Investment Survival and The Battle For Stock Market Profits. Loeb promoted a view of the market as too risky to hold stocks for the long term, in contrast to well-known value investors. He also created the Gerald Loeb Award, given annually for excellence in various categories of financial journalism.

== Early life ==
Loeb was born to Dahlia H. Levy and Solomon E. Loeb on July 24, 1899, in San Francisco, California. His brother, Sydney, was born on December 14, 1903. Solomon was a wealthy wine merchant from New Orleans. Dahlia was the daughter of Herman M. Levy, a wealthy merchant who made his fortune selling goods to miners during the California gold rush and the Comstock Lode silver rush in Nevada.

Two family tragedies struck Loeb when he was eight years old. First, his maternal grandfather died on June 25, 1908. Then, a week later on the 4th of July, his father was killed in a train collision in downtown Oakland while returning from a day trip to Santa Cruz to make arrangements for an upcoming family vacation there. A local train struck the smoking car of a Southern Pacific Railroad (SPR) train after the SPR train's engineer ignored the stop signal at the intersection of two tracks, killing several people in the car. SPR paid Dahlia and her children an $8,000 settlement (equivalent to $280,000 in 2024) split evenly among the three. The deaths of Loeb's father and grandfather made his mother very wealthy.

Loeb was afflicted with polio around the time of his father's death. The disease interfered with his schooling and derailed his ambitions to become an architect.

Loeb graduated from Lowell High School in San Francisco.

== Career and writing ==
Loeb began his career in 1921, working in the bond department of a securities firm in San Francisco. He moved to New York in 1924 after joining E. F. Hutton & Co., and became vice-chairman of the board when the company incorporated in 1962.

Although he had largely avoided personal losses, the Wall Street crash of 1929 greatly affected Loeb's investing style, making him skeptical of holding stocks for the long term. Loeb offered a contrarian investing viewpoint, in books and columns in Barron's, The Wall Street Journal, and Investor Magazine. Forbes magazine called Loeb "the most quoted man on Wall Street."

Loeb's first book, The Battle for Investment Survival (1935), sold over 200,000 copies during the Great Depression. Loeb updated the book in 1957 and 1965, as it attained the status of a classic financial text. In 1971, Loeb published The Battle for Stock Market Profits as a follow-up to his original book where he depicted the market as a battlefield. Loeb's books are still widely read today and hailed by many as a staple for investment professionals.

== Personal life ==
Loeb married Rose Lobree Benjamin on April 11, 1947, in San Francisco. Rose, the widow of Shanghai real estate developer Maurice Benjamin, was born in 1900 or 1901 in Brentwood, California, to Mr. and Mrs. A. E. Lobree.

== See also ==
- Gerald Loeb Award
