= Joe J. Plumeri =

American businessman (born 1943)

Joe Plumeri
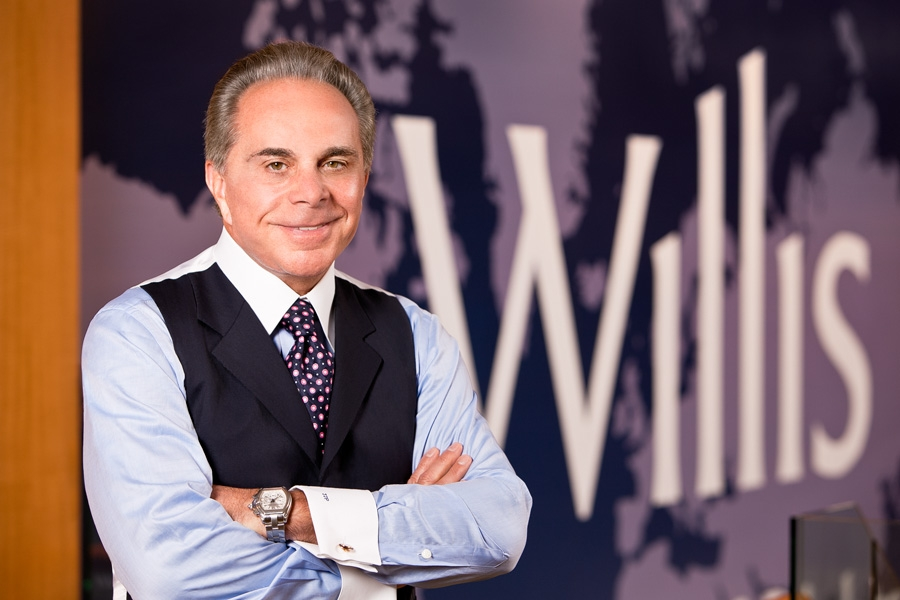

Personal details
- Born: July 7, 1943 (age 83) Trenton, New Jersey, United States
- Party: Republican
- Education: College of William & Mary (BA); New York Law School

Joseph J. Plumeri II (born July 7, 1943) is vice chairman of the First Data Board of Directors. He was the chairman and CEO of Willis Group Holdings (Willis), a New York Stock Exchange-listed insurance broker, until July 2013. The company has 17,000 employees in 400 offices, located in 120 countries. As of June 2010, Willis had the third-highest insurance brokerage revenues in the world.

Plumeri worked for Citigroup from 1968 to 2000. During that time he held the roles of president and managing partner of Shearson Lehman Brothers, president of Smith Barney, vice chairman of Travelers, chairman and CEO of Primerica, and CEO of Citibank, North America. He was appointed chairman and CEO of Willis in 2000.

Plumeri is also the co-owner of the Trenton Thunder. The team plays in Samuel J. Plumeri Sr., Field, named after his father. In addition, he funded the construction of Plumeri Park, the stadium of the William & Mary Tribe baseball team. A philanthropist, he has made multimillion-dollar gifts to The College of William & Mary and the Make-a-Wish Foundation.

== Early life ==
Plumeri is the son of Samuel J. Plumeri Sr. (a Trenton city commissioner and local businessman, who died in 1998) and Josephine Plumeri (who died in 2012). His grandparents immigrated to the United States from Villalba, Sicily. He was raised in North Trenton, New Jersey, in a working-class family. Speaking of his father, he said: "He never quit, and he always saw the good in everything. He was a dreamer, and because of my father ... I have an affection for people who are passionate."

Plumeri attended Trenton Catholic High School and Bordentown Military Institute (1962). He then studied at The College of William & Mary, graduating in 1966 with a B.A. in History and Education. While an undergraduate, he played on the William & Mary Tribe football team (on scholarship as a halfback for Lou Holtz) and baseball team (as a second baseman and outfielder). He was also a member of Pi Kappa Alpha.

Upon graduation, he first taught History for two years at Langhorne's Neshaminy High School in Bucks County, in Pennsylvania. There, he also coached football and two other sports.

In 1968, he was in the Army Reserve for six months at Fort Jackson, South Carolina. After he was released, he enrolled in New York Law School in 1968, but did not finish before leaving although he was given an Honorary Doctorate of Law from the school in 2015.

== Business career ==
Plumeri worked at Citigroup Inc. and its predecessors companies from 1968 until 2000, when he was appointed as chairman and CEO of Willis.

=== Carter, Berlind & Weill/Shearson Lehman Brothers (1968–93) ===
While in law school, one afternoon in 1968 he decided to look for part-time employment, and began knocking on doors in the Wall Street area. Entering 55 Broad Street, he looked at the lobby directory and noticed the name Carter, Berlind & Weill. Assuming (incorrectly) that if a firm had three names or more than it must be a law firm, he applied for a job. He decided to take a position with the firm even after he discovered it was not a law firm but a brokerage house.

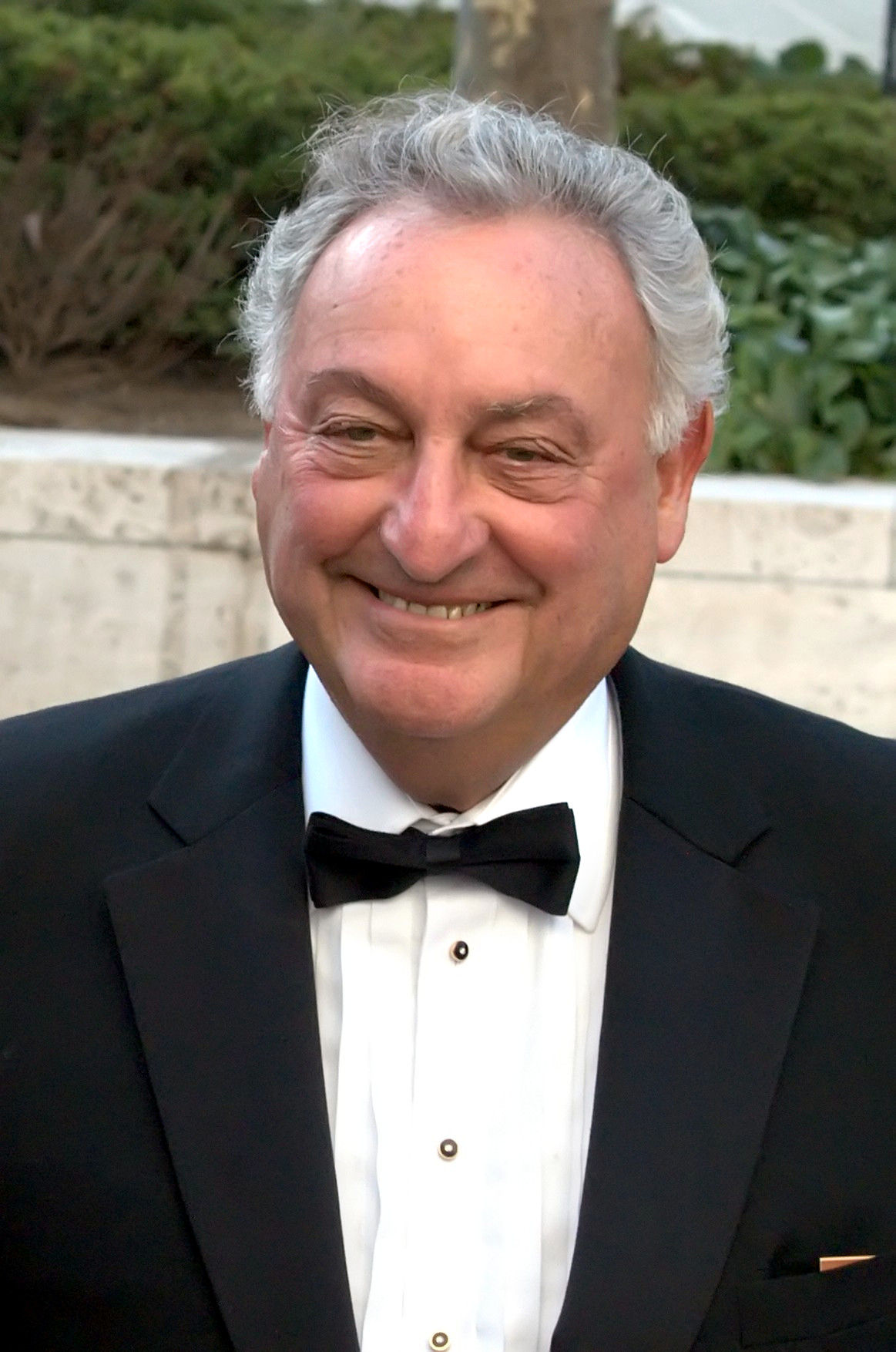
Sandy Weill

The man he interviewed with was Sandy Weill, a founding partner of Carter, Berlind & Weill who later served as CEO of Citigroup, Inc. Weill hired the 24-year-old Plumeri as a part-time clerk, arranged for a closet to be converted into a tiny office, and mentored him. The two were co-workers for many years, with Plumeri as one of Weill's top lieutenants. Plumeri said: "Sandy has been my role model. He's the shrewdest, smartest businessman I've ever seen, and he's also the sweetest."

Soon after starting to work at the brokerage firm, Plumeri dropped out of law school. The small brokerage ultimately became Shearson, and Weill sold it to American Express in 1981 for stock valued at $930 million ($3,293,000,000 today). By 1985, Plumeri was a senior executive vice president and director of national sales and marketing.

Plumeri became the president & managing partner of Shearson Lehman Brothers in 1990.

=== Smith Barney (1993–94) ===
In 1993, Weill bought Shearson back from American Express. He paid $1 billion ($2,229,000,000 today), and merged it into its fellow stockbroker Smith Barney.

Weill then offered Plumeri the presidency of Smith Barney. "That was the most satisfying moment of my life", recalled Plumeri. "I cried—as usual—and I remember that Sandy shed a tear, too." That year Plumeri became the president of the merged company, and managed the merger.

Weill abruptly dismissed Plumeri in August 1994. Plumeri noted: "I was so intent on getting the job done, that I eliminated the input of other people. If I'd done better at nurturing relationships, who knows how it would have turned out?" Weill made Plumeri a vice chairman of Travelers Group Inc. almost immediately thereafter.

=== Primerica Financial Services (1995–99) ===
Plumeri was then made Chairman & CEO of Travelers Group's Primerica Financial Services division (Primerica), a position he held from 1995 to 1999.

In 1997, Plumeri earned at least $3 million ($6,020,000 today) in compensation. In 1998, Primerica had net income of $398 million (on net sales of $1.65 billion), nearly double its 1994 $209 million net income (on net sales of $1.28 billion). Speaking of his approach in business, Plumeri said:

I am an emotional person with a lot of drive, and that has caused some problems in my career. But I come from the view that you've got to be yourself, for better or worse. And what got me where I am today was my emotion.

=== Citigroup (1999–2000) ===
Plumeri worked on the amalgamation of Travelers Group and Citicorp after the $70 billion ($135,287,655,000 today) 1999 merger of the two to form Citigroup Inc.

Following the integration, he was appointed CEO of Citibank, North America by Citigroup co-Chairmen Weill and John Reed. J. Paul Newsome, an analyst with CIBC Oppenheimer, said: "He's not the spit-and-polish executive many people expected. He's rough on the edges. But Citibank knows the bank as an institution is in trouble—it can't get away anymore with passive selling—and Plumeri has all the passion to throw a glass of cold water on the bank." At this point, Weill and Reed stepped down. As CEO of Citibank N.A., he navigated the unit's earnings from $108 million to $415 million in one year, an increase of nearly 400%. In January 2000, somewhat unexpectedly, Plumeri retired from Citibank.

=== Willis (2000–2013) ===
==== The early years ====
While vacationing in Paris, the Plumeris by chance met Henry Kravis whose leveraged buyout firm, Kohlberg Kravis Roberts (KKR), had purchased the Willis Group in 1998 for $1.4 billion. When Kravis asked what he was doing, Plumeri's wife jokingly said: "Find him a job". Kravis called him two weeks later, and suggested that Plumeri run Willis.

Initially, Plumeri had no interest in the position. He said: "I really didn't want the job. I didn't know anything about insurance. I certainly didn't know anything about London. And I didn't know if my act would fly in London, to be honest with you." But the more he examined it the more appealing it became, and Weill advised him that he should definitely take the position.

Plumeri assumed the post of chairman & chief executive officer at Willis on October 15, 2000. He replaced John Reeve, who retired, and became the company's first non-British CEO and first non-insurance industry CEO.

The staid, nearly 200-year-old, tradition-laden British-based company (established in 1828) had just incurred a loss in 1999 of $104 million ($201,000,000 today).

"This is exactly the kind of leadership opportunity I've been looking for to focus the next stage of my career", Plumeri decided. His five-year contract provided for an annual base salary of $1 million, guaranteed bonuses of $1 million annually, further incentive bonuses, and stock options for 5.2 million Willis shares at approximately $2.80 per share. Plumeri pledged to his employees that as long as he was CEO, he would not sell any of his Willis stock. He said: "Maybe I'd give it to charity, but selling the stock for my own benefit, I think is wrong. I'm supposed to be the chief cheerleader of the company, not only to investors but to my employees, and to exhort them to buy my stock, while I'm selling it, is wrong."

He began his Willis career without much background in insurance brokering. Plumeri admitted, "I don't know what I don't know, so I've asked a lot of questions", but noted that "When you are in virgin territory without any baggage, sometimes that is better because you don't have a sense of what you can't do."

==== Changes ====
On arrival, Plumeri tried to unify the staff and create a sense of teamwork by providing each employee with a lapel pin and requiring them to wear it. The Sunday Times reported that once when Plumeri had a breakfast meeting with two of his executives at a New York hotel, he noticed that one was not wearing his Willis lapel pin. The paper described it as "probably a sacking offense". Thinking quickly, the executive responded: "I'm sorry, sir. I must have left it on my pyjamas."

To bolster enhanced communication and cooperation, he ordered that all office doors remain open (or had them removed, including the door to his own office). He lowered the height of the partitions between cubicles. He himself flew about 400,000 miles (640,000 km) a year to meet with people, to help build the company. The CEO of the company's global markets division, Grahame J. Millwater, said: "The sheer dynamism of the individual took us a little bit by surprise. We had a very different management style before."

Plumeri observed:

Many companies do not articulate to their employees why they are there. You’ve got to figure out what the home run is. What we are doing here is creating a company whose value grows, and that value is measured by the price of our stock. That's the scoreboard.... Once people understand and buy into the vision, it's amazing what one can do.... If you don’t give people a vision, they don’t enjoy the trip because they don’t know where they are going.

To avoid having to reduce the number of staff members that he had inherited, Plumeri chose to move some of them to what he viewed as better-suited roles.

At Willis, he has been an outspoken supporter of banning contingent commissions.

In June 2001, he brought the company back to public ownership in an IPO, and had it listed on the New York Stock Exchange. At the time, its stock price was $13.50. Within two years, by May 2, 2003, it was $31.27, an increase of 132%. On February 27, 2004, it was at $38.35.

For 2002, the company's net income was $210 million. In 2003, it rose to $414 million.

By February 2007, he had grown the company at an annual rate of 12% per year. In 2008, Plumeri headed Willis' $2.1 billion acquisition of U.S. rival Hilb, Rogal & Hobbs Co. (HRH). By August 2008, Willis was worth $4.5 billion. In his first eight years at Willis, the company's net worth doubled, its margins rose from 7% to 32%, and its stock price rose from $3-per-share to $32-per-share.

In 2008, he directed the sale of Willis's London headquarters at 10 Trinity Square, relocating to 51 Lime Street, the fourth-tallest building in the City of London. Locals referred to the new headquarters as "Plumeri's Palace". The building incorporates Plumeri's "no-doors" policy, a policy which extends to his own office.

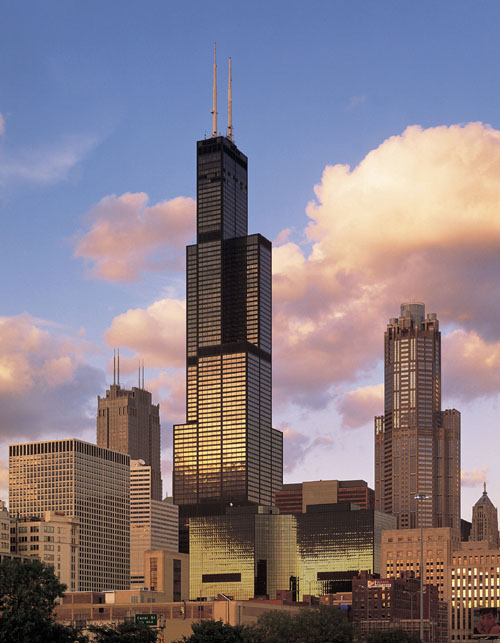
Willis Tower, Chicago

In 2009, he struck a deal that led to the 110-story Sears Tower in Chicago, the tallest building in North America, being renamed the Willis Tower, as the company rented 140,000 square feet (13,000 m^{2}) of its office space. He and Mayor Richard Daley unveiled a sign with the new name in a ceremony in July. Plumeri said: "You can call it anything you want... you can call it the 'Big Willie' for all I care. As a matter of fact, I wish you would."

Plumeri received compensation of $8.1 million in 2007, $19.9 million in 2008, and $10.9 million in 2009 (consisting of a salary of $1 million, bonus of $1.7 million, restricted stock awards of $7.3 million, and other compensation of $.9 million). Willis extended his contract in January 2010 until July 7, 2013. As of March 2010, Plumeri owned 3.8 million shares of the company, representing 2.3%.

By 2010, Willis had 17,000 employees in 400 offices located in 120 countries.

With regards to his philosophy of life, Plumeri said: "I’m from the school of anything's possible. I’m from the group that says it doesn’t matter where you are from, but that it does matter how big you dream."

=== Post-Willis (2013–present) ===
On August 19, 2013, Kohlberg Kravis Roberts & Co. LP announced Plumeri's appointment as senior advisor.

==== Boards ====
Plumeri's concurrent board responsibilities outside of Willis have included the boards of Telex Communications (from 2000), Commerce Bancorp (from 2003), the Council on Foreign Relations, and the American Institute for Chartered Property Casualty Underwriters. Now he serves on the boards of The National Center on Addiction and Substance Abuse at Columbia University, Mount Sinai Medical Center, Intrepid Sea, Air & Space Museum, Jackie Robinson Foundation, Carnegie Hall, and the Churchill Centre and Museum at the Cabinet War Rooms in London.

== Sports interests ==
Samuel J. Plumeri Sr. Field

Plumeri co-owns the Trenton Thunder. The team plays at Samuel J. Plumeri Sr. Field, the 6,341-seat stadium he named after his father in 1999.

In 2001, he became the co-owner of another New Jersey minor league baseball team, the Jersey Shore BlueClaws, the High-A affiliate of the Philadelphia Phillies. It is located in Lakewood in Ocean County, on the Jersey Shore.

He also invested £100,000 towards a minority interest in the Plymouth Argyle Football Club in the United Kingdom, giving him an indirect ownership interest in the club of less than 1%. He was introduced to the team by its chairman Sir Roy Gardner, who is also on the Willis board.

Plumeri was commissioner of the New Jersey Sports and Exposition Authority from 1997 to 2004.

== Restaurant ==
In December 2001, he opened a family restaurant named "Plumeri" in TriBeCa with his son Jay. In 2010 his son opened a restaurant named "Race Lane" in East Hampton, New York.

== Philanthropy ==
Plumeri Park is the 1,000-seat baseball facility of the William & Mary Tribe baseball team since 1999, constructed in large part on the basis of a donation by Plumeri in the autumn of 1996. He had it named in honor of his father.

In 2008, he provided $2 million to create the Plumeri Awards for Faculty Excellence at William & Mary. He also funded the Joseph J. Plumeri Business Scholarship, the Joseph J. Plumeri Endowment Fund for baseball scholarships for the school, and the W&M/Plumeri Pro-Am Golf Tournament.

He donated $2 million to the construction of the "Samuel & Josephine Plumeri Wishing Place", the headquarters of the New Jersey Chapter of the Make-A-Wish Foundation (named in honor of his parents). It was the largest gift ever to the Foundation, nationwide.

He also contributed $1 million to the College of St. Rose in Albany, New York, for the development of the school's new Christian Plumeri Sports Complex. It was named in honor of his deceased son.

Plumeri is a board member of The National Center on Addiction and Substance Abuse (CASA) at Columbia University (since 1998), Mount Sinai Medical Center, the Intrepid Sea-Air-Space Museum, and Churchill Museum in London. He is a member of William & Mary's governing Board of Visitors, Business School Advisory Board, and Sir Robert Boyle Society, as well as a lifetime member of the President's Council and a trustee emeritus of the William & Mary Endowment Association.

Plumeri was also the commencement speaker at the College of Saint Rose in 2006, Richard Bland College of the College of William and Mary in 2008, and the College of William and Mary in 2011.

In November 2015, Plumeri and his wife Susan donated $5 million to New York Law School to support the creation of the Joe Plumeri Center for Social Justice and Economic Opportunity.

== Awards ==
- 1991 Italian-American Hall of Fame (inducted)
- 2004 Good Scout Award (Boy Scouts of America)
- 2004 Award for Special Achievement in Business (the National Italian American Foundation)
- 2006 Insurance Leader of the Year (St. John's University School of Risk Management)
- 2006 Humanitarian of the Year (Make-a-Wish Foundation of New Jersey)
- 2007 Salute Award, in recognition of business achievements and philanthropic activities (the Intrepid Foundation)
- 2008 National Education & Leadership Award (The Sons of Italy Foundation)
- 2009 & 2010 Lists of "100 Most Influential People in Finance" (Treasury & Risk magazine)
- 2010 Business Achievement Award (Beta Gamma Sigma)
- 2010 Achievement in Industry Award (The Jackie Robinson Foundation)
- 2011 Honorary Doctor of Public Service from The College of William and Mary
- 2011 Grand marshal, New York City Columbus Day Parade, Columbus Citizens Foundation
- 2015 Honorary Doctor of Law, New York Law School
- 2016 Distinguished Achievement Award, Pi Kappa Alpha fraternity

== Family ==
With then-wife Nancy (née Walton) Plumeri, he raised three children. He currently lives in New York City.

Speaking of his son Christian, who died in November 2008 at age 39 from drug addiction, he said: "You deal with it, but it's so difficult. I think about it all the time; think about it every day. You always think about what you could have done differently."

His brother Paul Plumeri Sr., is a blues guitarist. His brother Samuel J. Plumeri Jr., is vice chairman of the New Jersey State Parole Board and chairman the Capital Health Board of Directors. He also served as a Trenton police officer, Mercer County (New Jersey) sheriff, and for a decade was superintendent of Police/Director of Public Safety for the Port Authority of New York and New Jersey.

His mother, Josephine Plumeri, died on January 20, 2012, at the age of 97.
