= Arcade (village), New York =

Arcade, New York
- Village
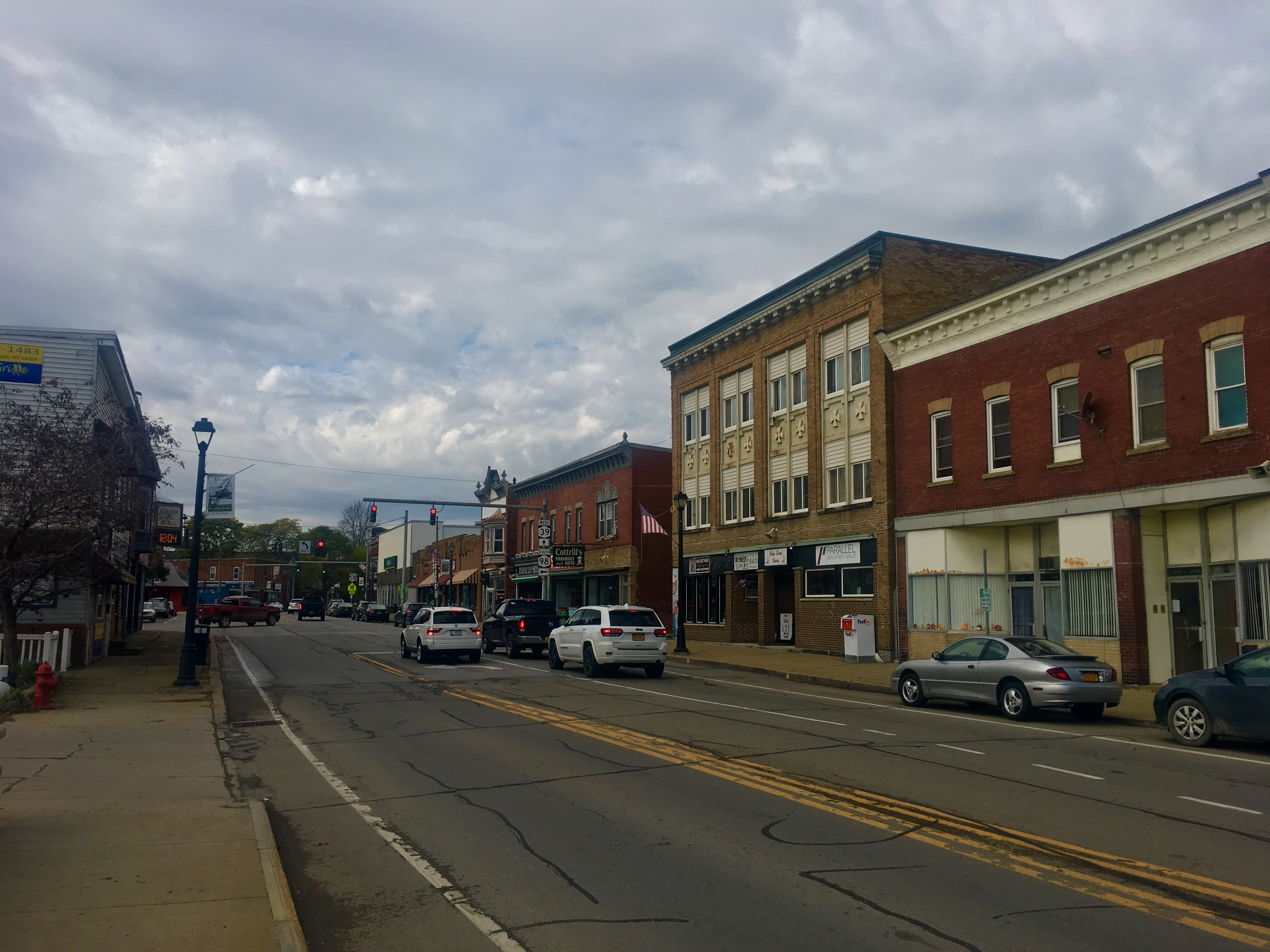
- Main Street

- Location within the state of New York
- Coordinates: 42°32′0″N 78°25′44″W
- Country: United States
- State: New York
- County: Wyoming
- Incorporated: July 12, 1871
- Named for: Arcade (architecture)

Area
  - Total: 2.65 sq mi (6.87 km^{2})
  - Land: 2.65 sq mi (6.86 km^{2})
  - Water: 0.0039 sq mi (0.01 km^{2})
- Elevation: 1,480 ft (450 m)

Population (2020)
  - Total: 1,908
  - Density: 720.2/sq mi (278.06/km^{2})
- Time zone: UTC-5 (Eastern (EST))
  - Summer (DST): UTC-4 (EDT)
- ZIP code: 14009
- Area codes: 716, 585
- FIPS code: 36-02407
- GNIS feature ID: 0942534
- Website: villageofarcadeny.gov

Arcade is a village in Wyoming County, New York. The population was 2,071 at the 2010 census.

The Village of Arcade in located in the southwest part of the Town of Arcade. The village is the location of the principal station of the Arcade and Attica Railroad and is located at the junction of NYS 39 and NYS 98.

A branch of Genesee Community College is located in Arcade.

The Prestolite Electric Leece-Neville division at 400 Main Street in the former Motorola plant serves as a primary employer in the village. Other large employers include: Tops Friendly Markets, Pioneer Credit Recovery and Koike Aronson.

== History ==
The village was incorporated in 1871.

== Geography ==
Arcade is located at 42°31′59″N 78°25′44″W (42.533257, -78.428894).

According to the United States Census Bureau, the village has a total area of 2.5 square miles (6.5 km^{2}), all land.

Clear Creek joins Cattaraugus Creek in the village.

New York State Route 39 and 98 converge on the village.

== Demographics ==
Historical population
Census	Pop.	Note	%±
1840	300		—
1850	300		0.0%
1860	637		112.3%
1870	573		−10.0%
1880	762		33.0%
1900	887		—
1910	1,294		45.9%
1920	1,609		24.3%
1930	1,643		2.1%
1940	1,683		2.4%
1950	1,818		8.0%
1960	1,930		6.2%
1970	1,972		2.2%
1980	2,052		4.1%
1990	2,081		1.4%
2000	2,026		−2.6%
2010	2,071		2.2%
2020	1,908		−7.9%
U.S. Decennial Census

As of the census of 2000, there were 2,026 people, 819 households, and 520 families residing in the village. The population density was 810.0 inhabitants per square mile (312.7/km^{2}). There were 876 housing units at an average density of 350.2 per square mile (135.2/km^{2}). The racial makeup of the village was 98.82% White, 0.35% Black or African American, 0.15% Native American, 0.25% Asian, 0.10% from other races, and 0.35% from two or more races. Hispanic or Latino of any race were 1.33% of the population.

There were 819 households, out of which 35.9% had children under the age of 18 living with them, 46.8% were married couples living together, 12.7% had a female householder with no husband present, and 36.4% were non-families. 32.6% of all households were made up of individuals, and 15.1% had someone living alone who was 65 years of age or older. The average household size was 2.47 and the average family size was 3.15.

In the village, the population was spread out, with 29.6% under the age of 18, 8.1% from 18 to 24, 28.4% from 25 to 44, 21.3% from 45 to 64, and 12.6% who were 65 years of age or older. The median age was 36 years. For every 100 females, there were 89.9 males. For every 100 females age 18 and over, there were 85.0 males.

The median income for a household in the village was $33,724, and the median income for a family was $42,688. Males had a median income of $33,646 versus $25,441 for females. The per capita income for the village was $16,577. About 4.9% of families and 8.8% of the population were below the poverty line, including 11.7% of those under age 18 and 8.5% of those age 65 or over.

== Education ==
It is in the Yorkshire-Pioneer Central School District.
