= Globe Wernicke =

American furniture company

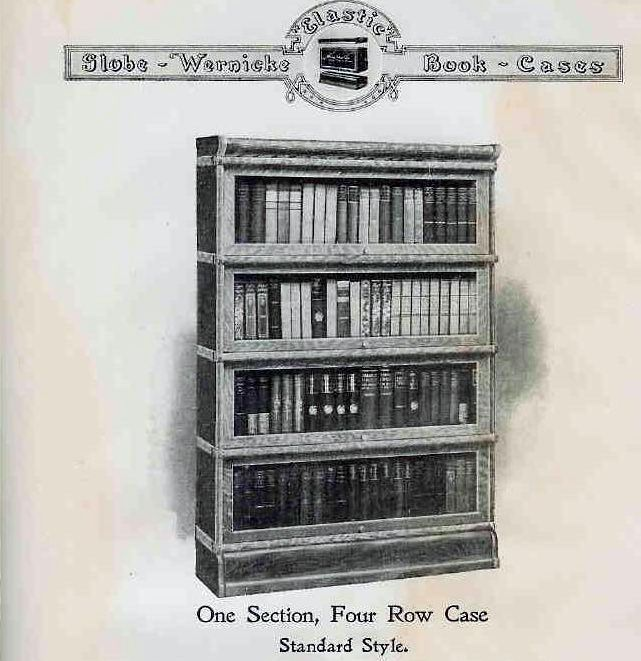
- Type: Private
- Industry: offices furniture
- Predecessor: The Globe Files Company
- Founded: 1899; 127 years ago
- Defunct: 1955
- Fate: Acquired
- Successor: City Auto Stamping Company
- Products: Desks, Bookcases, Shelves

The Globe-Wernicke Co Ltd was an American furniture company based in Cincinnati, Ohio, United States. The company was founded in 1893, and specialized in the design and manufacture of office furniture and bookcases.

== History ==
Globe-Wernicke was formed as a result of the Cincinnati based Globe Files Company (est. in 1882) purchasing the Minneapolis based Wernicke Company, founded in 1893 by Otto Wernicke, in 1899. The company is best known for their high-end bookcases, desks, and other office furniture. Globe-Wernicke established factories in the United States, Canada, United Kingdom, France and Germany.

The company patented the "elastic bookcases" also known as a modular bookcase or barrister's bookcase. These were high-quality stacking book shelves, with a standard width of 34 inches, in oak, walnut and mahogany, capable of being adapted to fit together to form a bookcase which could either be all of the same measurements or which could be rearranged by the insertion of units of different depths and heights. These glass-fronted shelves are today collectible antiques highly desired by collectors. With regularity, these bookcases appear in auctions and internet sites and, what originally cost $75 or so will now be sold for $900 or more.

During World War II 90% of the company's business in the US was converted to produce military equipment.

=== Mergers and acquisitions ===
- In September 1955, the company was purchased by the City Auto Stamping Company of Toledo, Ohio.
- In 1963 Globe-Wernicke acquired the Weis Manufacturing Company, and changed the company name to Globe-Weis Systems Company.
- In 1987 American Trading and Production Company purchased Globe-Weis, and operated them under new name - ATAPCO Office Products Group.
- In 2000 Cardinal Brands Inc. of Lawrence, Kansas formed, merging Globe-Weis and four other brands.
