= Sheller-Globe Corporation =

- Type: Private
- Industry: Automotive
- Predecessor: City Auto Stamping Company
- Founded: 1966; 60 years ago
- Defunct: 1989
- Fate: Acquired
- Successor: United Technologies Corporation
- Headquarters: Toledo, Ohio, United States
- Divisions: North America

Sheller-Globe Corporation was a U.S. auto parts manufacturer and industrial conglomerate based in Toledo, Ohio. Formed in 1966 on a heritage of much older companies, Sheller-Globe grew through the acquisition (and divestiture) of many other businesses before it was acquired by United Technologies Corporation in 1989.

== History ==
Sheller-Globe Corporation was established in 1966, with the combination of two much older companies, the earlier having been formed in the 19th century.

=== 1882: Globe Files Company ===
Cincinnati, Ohio-based Globe Files Company was formed in Cincinnati in 1882. The original purpose of the Globe Files Company was to manufacture file cabinets and office equipment. Two years after the company was formed, its first catalogue was released. As business expanded into diverse areas, the company's name was changed to the Globe Company. In 1890, the Michigan-based office supply company Wernicke Company was acquired. The company became Globe Wernicke.

In the 1950s Globe-Wernicke was acquired by the Toledo-based City Auto Stamping Company, a maker of automotive body parts dies and other large stampings, which made grilles, light fixtures, consoles, and arm rests for large automobile manufacturers. The combined company was renamed Globe-Wernicke Industries, Inc., and it subsequently acquired the Aluminum Seating Corporation of Akron, Ohio.

=== 1916: Sheller Manufacturing Corporation ===
In the mid-1960s, as a new emphasis was placed on automotive safety features, Globe-Wernicke took a close look at the Detroit-based Sheller Manufacturing Corporation.

Sheller began in 1916 as a wood rim steering wheel manufacturer in Portland, Indiana. In 1958, Sheller had produced the first recessed safety steering wheel and padded dash safety package offered by Ford Motor Company.

=== 1966: Sheller-Globe created, growth ===
In 1966, the Dana Corporation was attempting a take-over of the Sheller Corporation, and the then President and CEO of Sheller, Januarius Arthur Mullen organized the leveraged merger with Globe which resulted in a private Sheller-Globe Corporation. The merger of the two companies took place on December 30, 1966. Headquarters of the new industrial conglomerate focused on auto parts were in Toledo, Ohio.

In 1969, Sheller-Globe acquired the Superior Coach Company, a long time school bus and professional car manufacturer based in Lima in Allen County, Ohio, as a subsidiary.

In 1974, Cleveland-based VLN Corporation was merged into Sheller-Globe. VLN's Leece-Neville divisions supplied heavy-duty alternators and related equipment to the automotive industry, and fractional horsepower motors for automotive and industrial customers. Its Paramount Fabricating division in Detroit made automotive stampings and assemblies, The Accurate Parts line of starter motor components served automotive aftermarkets. Another part of VLN, Victoreen Instrument Company was a leader in developing and producing electronic components and equipment.

In 1981 Sheller-Globe acquired Radiation-Medical Products Corporation, a manufacturer of radiation medical instruments and x-ray measuring instrumentation. The acquisition of this particular company had little to do with the automobile industry, and the decision to become involved in an unrelated area reflected a new disposition to capitalize on any market that looked extremely productive. Radiation Medical's operations were therefore merged into Victoreen.

In 1982 Sheller-Globe acquired the automotive business of Detroit-based Olsonite Corporation, a company which made steering wheels and injection-molded plastic parts and components. In 1984, Sheller-Globe acquired Northern Fibre Products Company, manufacturer of insulation and sound deadening materials and products for vehicle interiors.

Sheller-Globe's plastics manufacturing capabilities were also expanded in 1984 with the addition of the Engineered Polymers Company, a custom molder of structural foam cabinets for computers, word processors, work station components, communications devices, networking systems and other business machines.

=== Downsizing ===
Beginning in 1980, Sheller-Globe disposed of some additional units which were not as profitable as desired. Following a downturn in North American school bus purchase volumes as the children of the Baby Boom completed school, industry over-capacity among school bus manufacturers and a downturn in sales of funeral coaches, the company discontinued bus and professional car manufacturing at Superior Coach in Lima in late 1980, and portions of its assets were sold. Mid Bus, a small business based in Lima, resumed production of the smallest Superior school buses, beginning with a workforce of 7 persons. The small business grew successfully, and after a move to a much larger facility at Bluffton, Ohio, was acquired by Collins Industries in 1998. In 1981, the funeral car business of Superior was sold to Tom Earnhart, and as of 2007, continues to operate as a portion of Accubuilt, Inc., using the Superior Coach Company trade name. In 1987, the Leece-Neville division was sold to Prestolite Electric. That same year the Globe-Weis company was sold to the American Trading and Production Company.

In the mid-1980s, Sheller-Globe began fine-tuning its operations, largely abandoning automotive replacement parts (aftermarket) sales. Instead, it focused more on original equipment interior automotive products for the automotive manufacturers. Sheller-Globe's automotive related divisions supplied a wide range of original equipment parts, components and assemblies to the vehicle manufacturers. Products included thermoplastic, urethane and leather-wrapped steering wheels, instrument panel pads, padded consoles, arm rests and other padded components, tail lamp assemblies and a larger number of other products for vehicles.

=== Carrollton Bus Disaster ===
Many years after Sheller-Globe exited the school bus manufacturing business, a disastrous accident occurred with one of Superior bus bodies it had built. It was the worst school bus accident in U.S. history as of January 2007.

On May 14, 1988, shortly before 11:00 PM, a 1977 model school bus with a Ford B-700 chassis and a 66 passenger Superior body in use as a church bus was involved in the Carrollton bus disaster near Carrollton, Kentucky. 27 persons died and many more were injured after their bus was involved in a head-on collision with a drunk driver traveling the wrong way on Interstate 71. Although none of the bus occupants suffered mortal injuries in the impact, the victims were unable to evacuate quickly immediately after the impact as the gasoline tank of the bus ruptured and a fire broke out.

The bus had been built only 9 days before the 1977 FMVSS standards would have required additional collision protection of the Ford fuel tank. Improved access to emergency exits in the bus body would also have been required. The National Transportation Safety Board (NTSB) investigation and report was also critical of the flammability of the bus seats which had exacerbated the inability of the bus occupants to exit their burning bus.

The accident and the legal battle afterward were recounted in a 1994 book by James S. Kunen. Reckless Disregard: Corporate Greed, Government Indifference, and the Kentucky School Bus Crash was published by Simon & Schuster of New York City. (ISBN 0-671-70533-4)

Although no legal determination of product liability was ever made, Sheller-Globe and Ford Motor Company each contributed substantially to the settlement funds for those injured and the families of those who were killed.

== United Technologies Corporation ==
In the late 1980s, Sheller-Globe Corporation was acquired by United Technologies Corporation, and became known as the United Technologies Automotive Engineered Systems Division. In 1999, Lear Corporation purchased United Technologies Automotive from United Technologies Corporation.
