= Superior Coach Company =

United States bus manufacturer

- Type: Body manufacturer (defunct)
- Predecessor: Garford Motor Truck Company
- Founded: 1909; 117 years ago in Elyria, Ohio
- Defunct: 1980; 46 years ago
- Fate: Liquidated
- Successor: Accubuilt, Inc. (professional cars subsidiary, 2000−present); Mid Bus (school bus manufacturer, 1981–2008)
- Headquarters: Lima, Ohio, United States
- Area served: North America
- Products: Professional cars School buses
- Owner: Sheller-Globe Corporation (1969−1980)
- Website: http://www.superiorcoaches.com/ (for existing company)

Garford advertisement (1907)

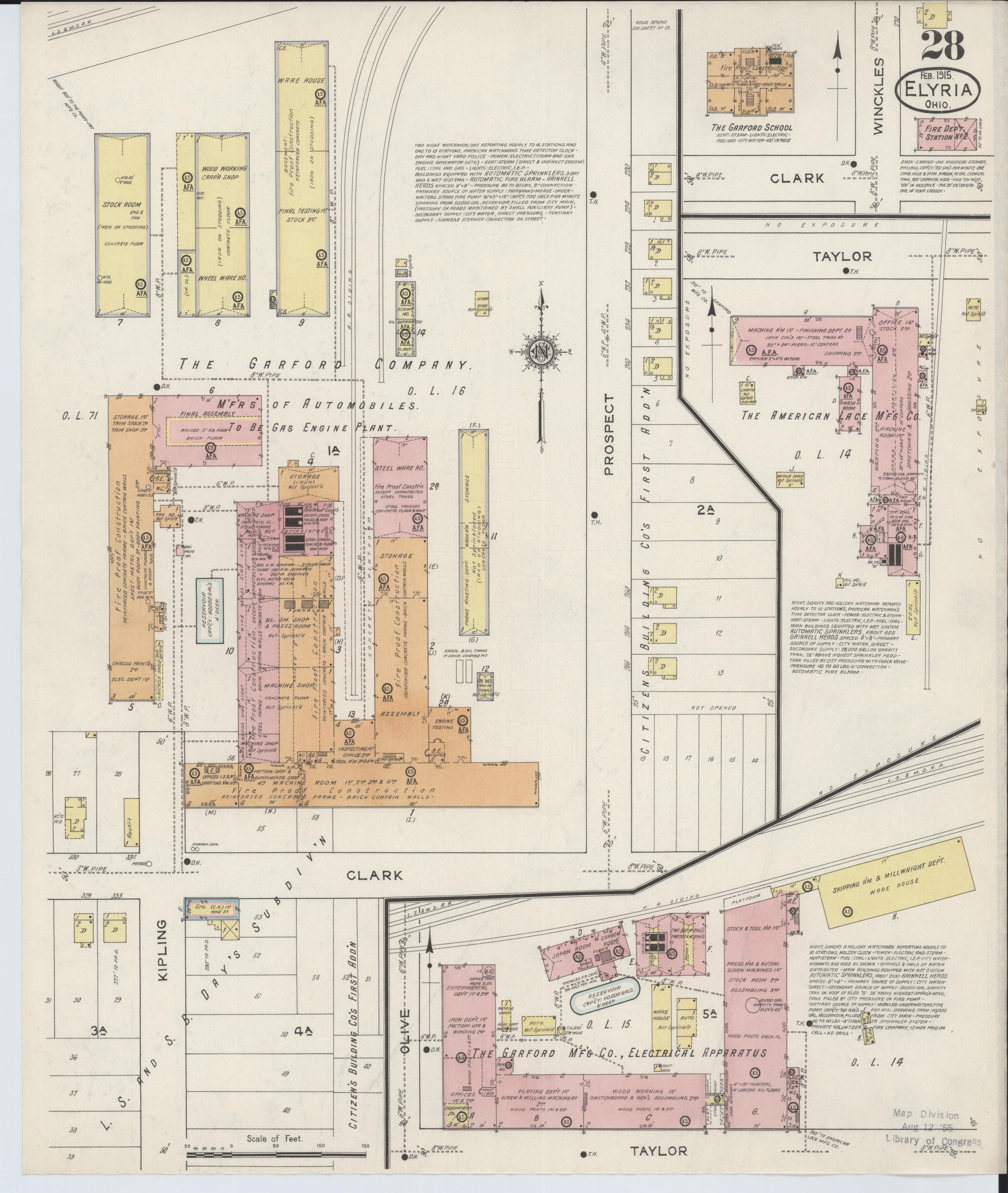
Garford Plant (1915)

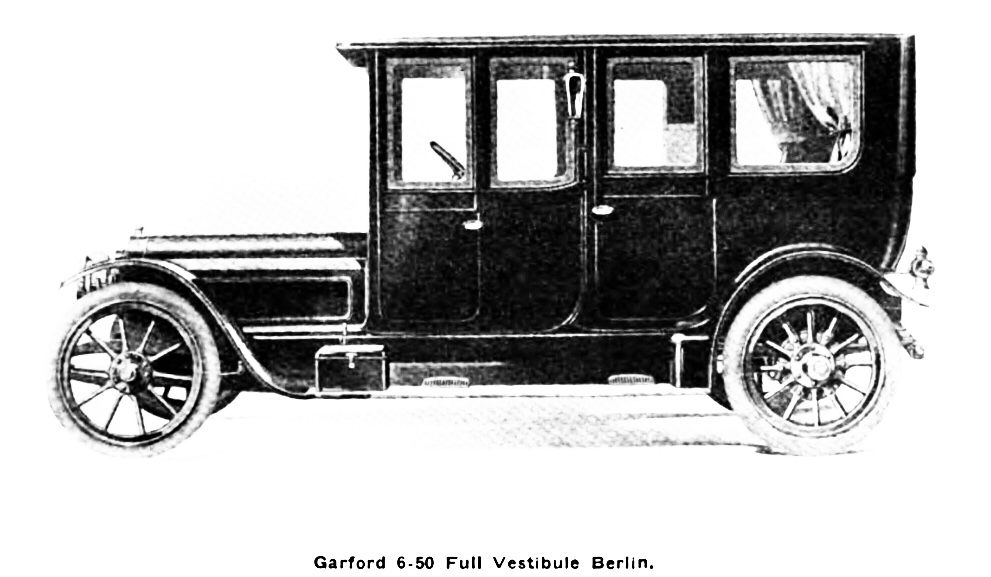
Garford Model G-12 (1912-1913)

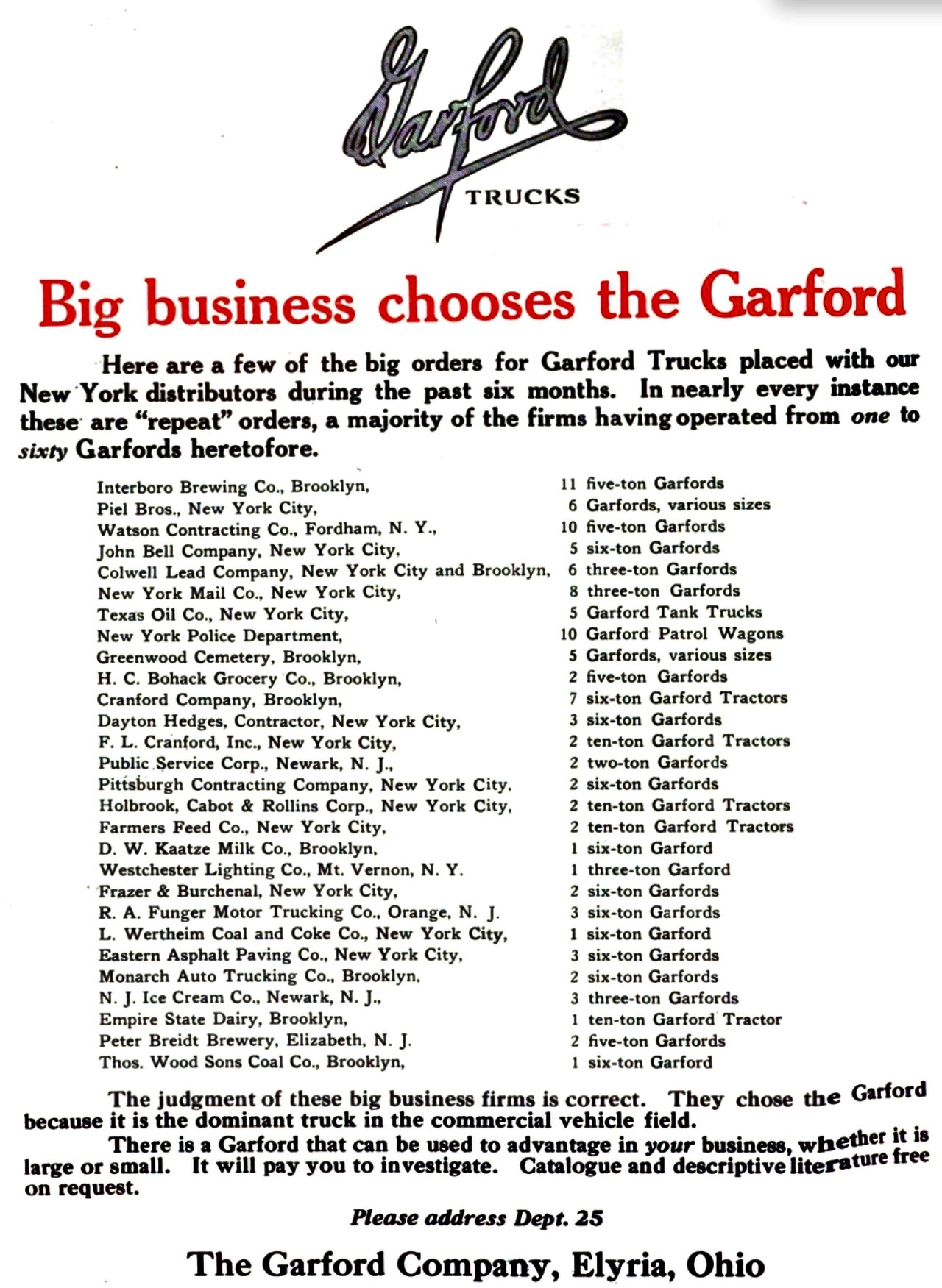
Garford order list 1913

Superior Coach was a coachbuilder in the American automotive industry. Founded in 1909 as the Garford Motor Truck Company, Superior is best known for constructing bodies for professional cars (hearses) and school buses. Following major downturns in both segments in the late 1970s, Superior was liquidated by its parent company in 1980. From 1925 to 1980, the company was based in Lima, Ohio.

After its 1980 closure, the Superior name would live on through several other companies. The manufacturing of school buses would play a part of the formation of Mid Bus (acquired by Collins Industries in 2008) and the professional car operations would remain in Lima as part of Accubuilt.

== Garford Motor Truck Company (1909–1925) ==
In 1909, the Garford Motor Truck Company was established in Elyria, Ohio, a small town 30 miles outside Cleveland.

By June 1912, the company was awarded a lucrative contract with the United States Post Office. The first order called for 11 trucks, the following for 20 trucks, for a total of 31 trucks. "This is very significant of the practical efficiency of this most advanced commercial car." The post office had experimented for two years "with practically every truck made." They tried not only all the leading American trucks, but the foreign trucks, as well. The test resulted in the Garford being awarded first honors. The Garford proved to be the most practical truck under all conditions.

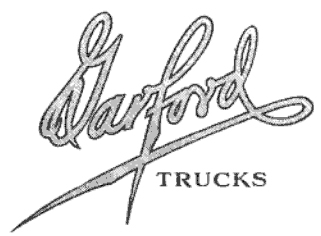
1912 Garford Motor Truck logo

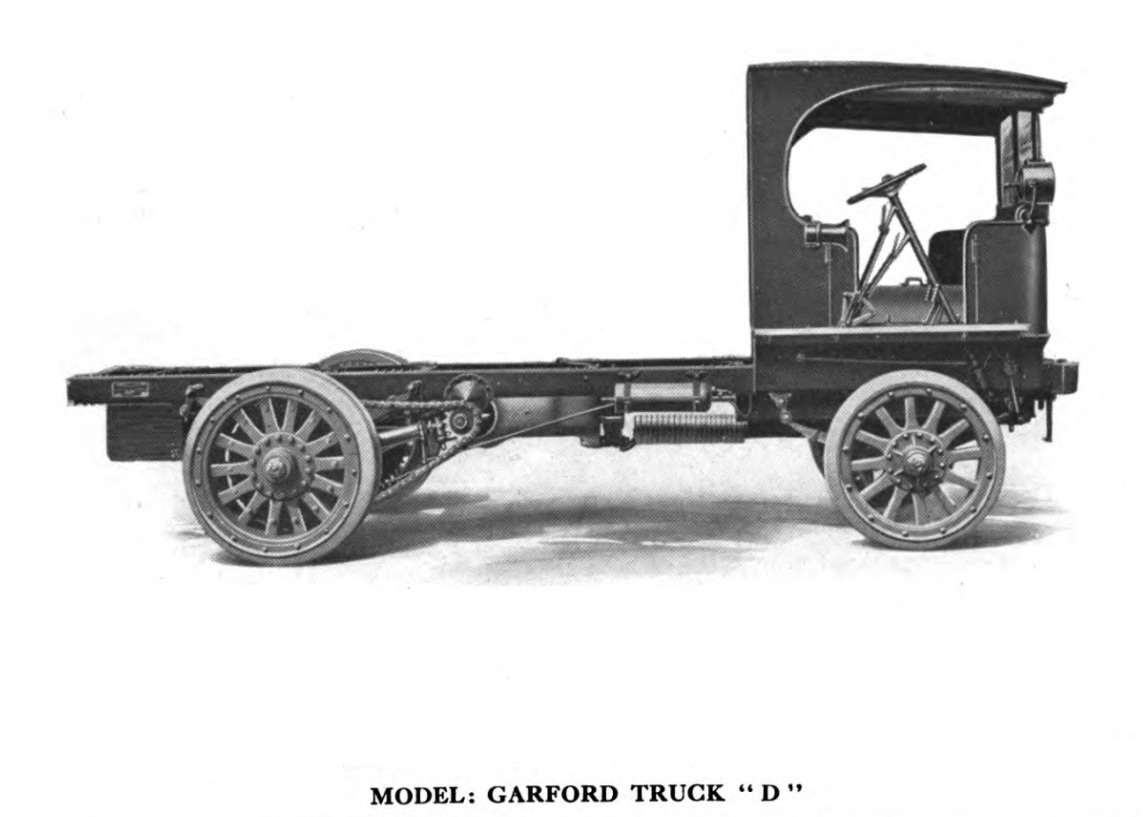
Garford Model D 4,5 t (1909-1919)

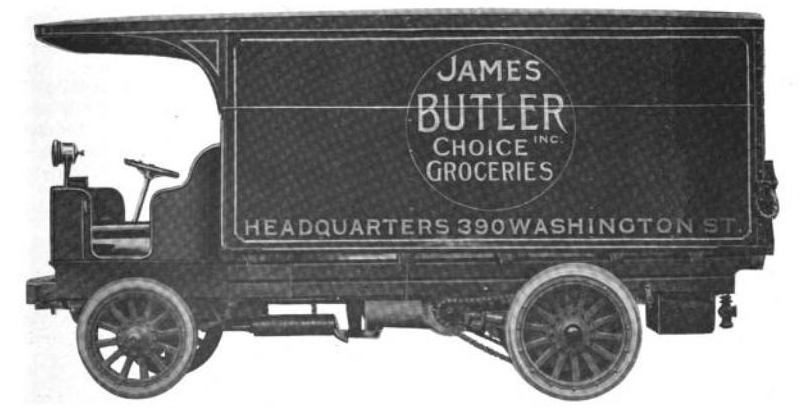
1912 Garford COE truck

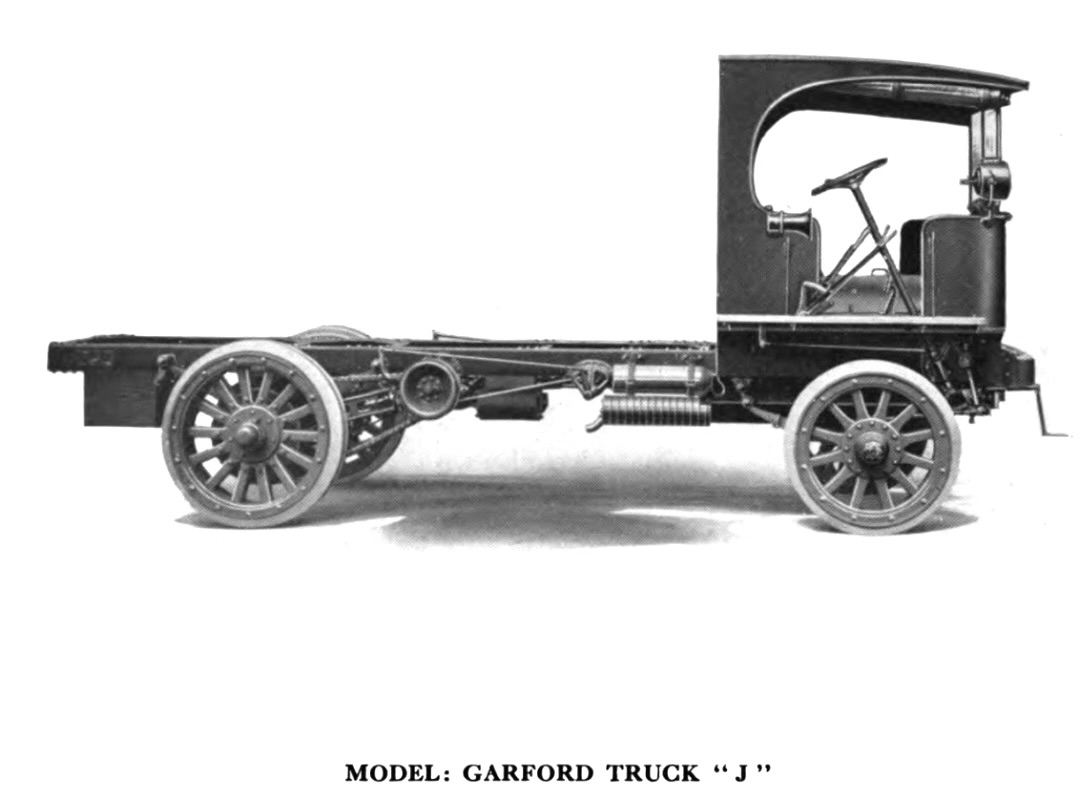
Garford Model J (1914)

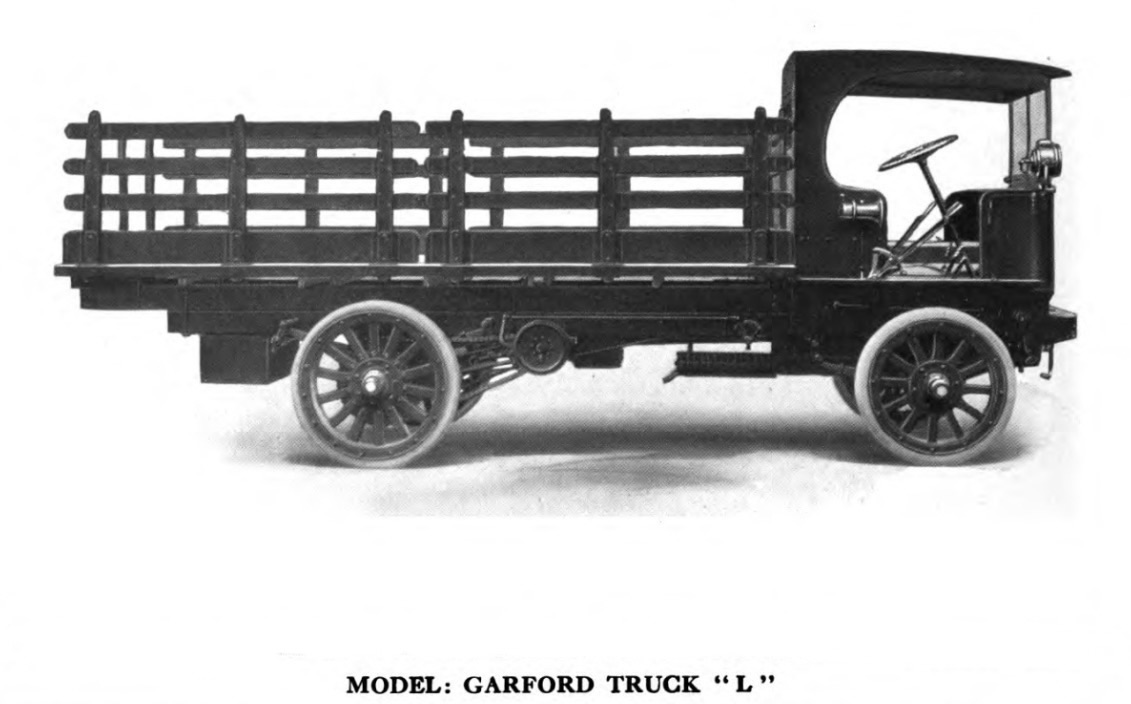
Garford Model L (1914)

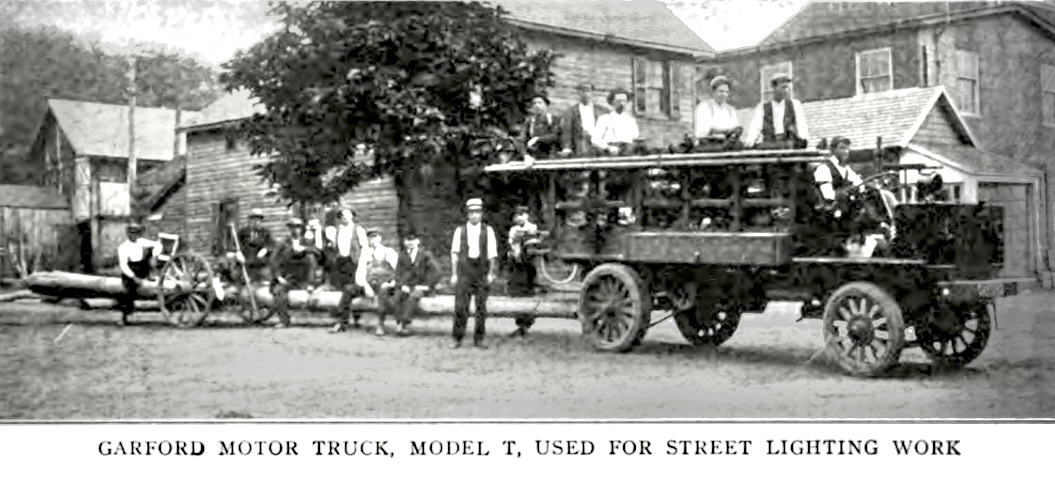
Garford Model T (1913)

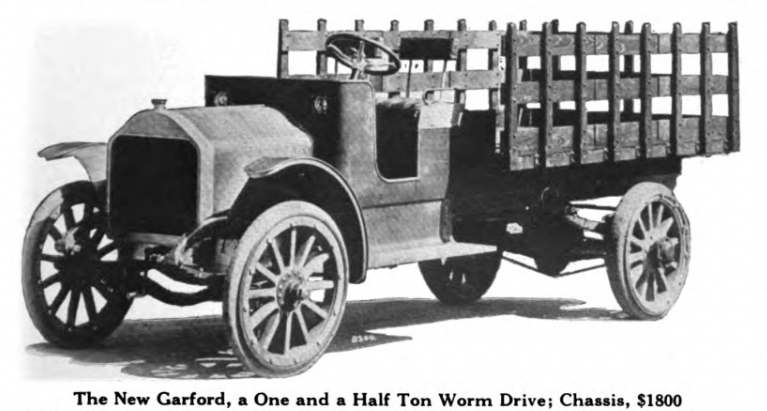
Garford Model 66 (1915) 1,5t

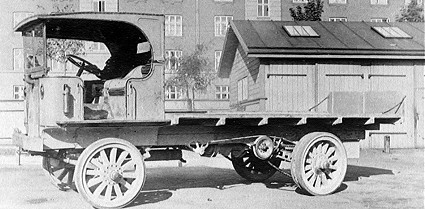
1916 Garford Model 68 5-ton truck

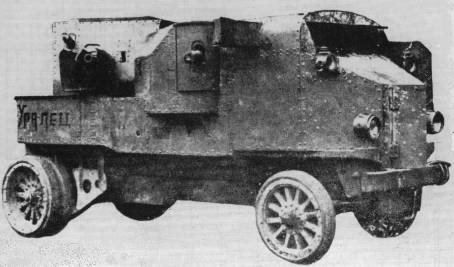
Russian Garford-Putilov armored car used in WWI (derived from Garford truck)

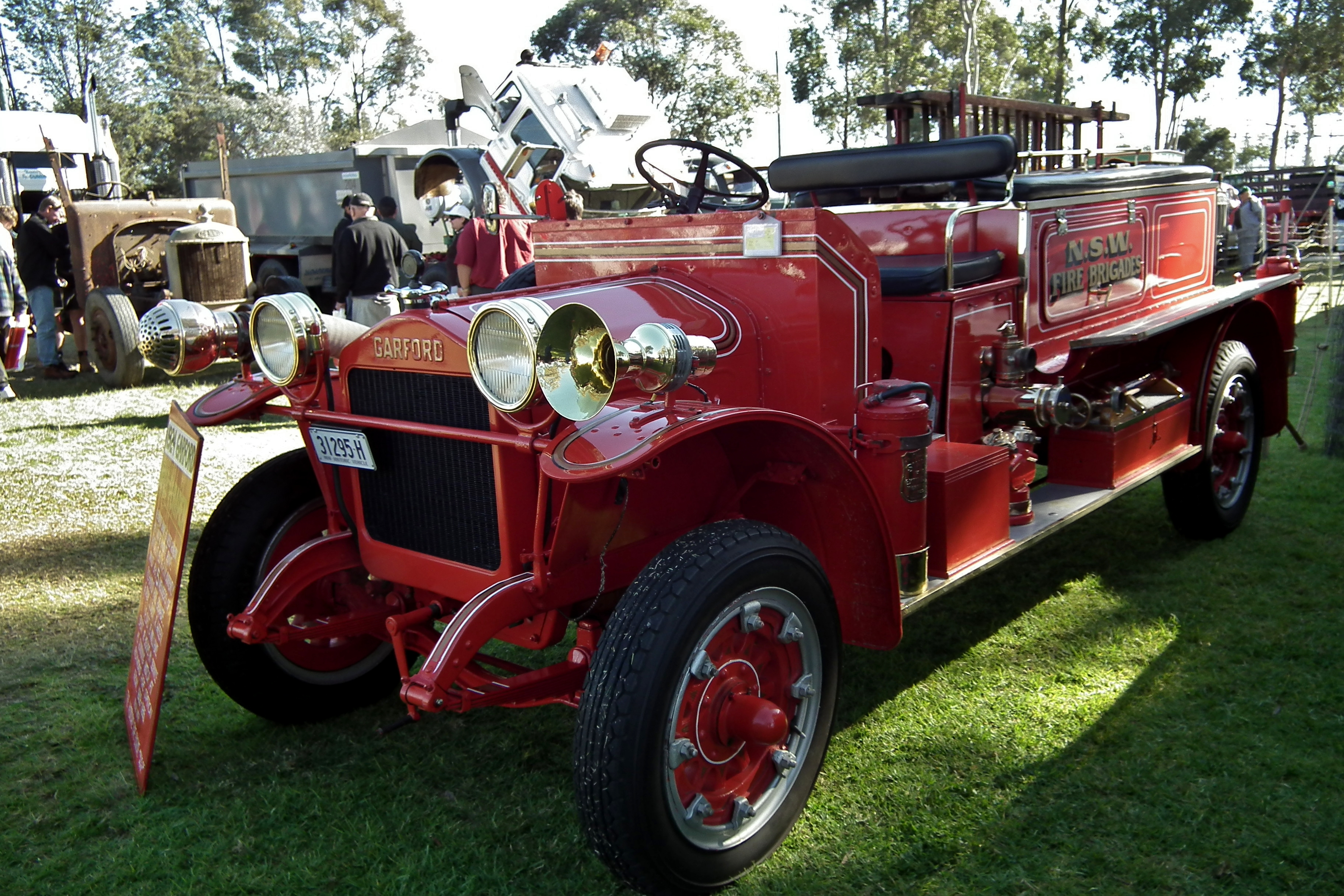
1924 Garford fire truck

== Production models Garford ==
The pre-assigned serial numbers only indicate the maximum possible production quantity.

Year	Production figures	Model	Load capacity	Serial number
1915	417	75	1 to	75051 to 75467
	458	66	1,5 to	66161 to 66619
	467	70	2 to	70051 to 70517
	279	77	3 to	77551 to 77829
	46	68	5 to	680501 to 680546
	36	69	6 to	690501 to 690536
Sum	1,703			
1916	272	75	1 to	75468 to 75739
	340	66	1,5 to	66620 to 66959
	264	70 B	2 to	70B518 to 70B781
	135	77	3 to	77830 to 77964
	67	68	5 to	680547 to 680613
	85	69	6 to	690537 to 690621
Sum	1,163			
1917	364	75 B	1 to	75740 to 751103
	163	66	1,5 to	66960 to 661122
	375	70 B	2 to	70B782 to 70B1156
	52	77B	3,5 to	77B965 to 77B1006
	77	68	5 to	680613 to 680689
	84	69	6 to	690622 to 690705
Sum	1,115			
1918	460	75 C	1 to	751104 to 751563
	285	66 B	1,5 to	661123 to 661407
	747	70 B	2 to	70B1157 to 70B1903
	329	77 B	3,5 to	77B1007 to 77B1335
	163	68	5 to	680690 to 680852
	120	69	6 to	690706 to 690825
Sum	2,104			
1919	207	75 C	1 to	751564 to 751770
	659	25	1,25 to	25053 to 25711
	105	66 B	1,5 to	66B1499 to 66B1603
	484	70 B	2 to	70B1904 to 70B2387
	33	70 H	2 to	70H052 to 70H084
	273	77 C	3,5 to	77C1336 to 77C1608
	60	77 D	3,5 to	77D052 to 77D111
	31	68	5 to	680853 to 680883
	16	69	6 to	690826 to 690841
Sum	1,868			
1920	891	25 B	1,25 to	25B1550 to 25B2440
		25	1,25 to	25712 to
	1,173	70 H	2 to	70H085 to 70H1258
	33	68 D	5 to	68D050 to 68D082
		77D	3,5 to	77D112 to
		77 C	3,5 to	77C1609 to
Sum	> 2,100			
1921	45	25 B	1,25 to	25B2241 to 25B2285
	353	15	0,75 to	15050 to 15402
	47	70 H	2 to	70H1259 to 70H1305
	35	68 D	5 to	68D083 to 68D117
	19	150 A	7,5 to	150A051 to 150A069
		77D	3,5 to	77D112 to
Sum	> 500			
1922		15	0,75 to	
		25 B	1,25 to	
		70 H	2 to	
		68 D	5 to	
		150 A	7,5 to	
		51 D	25 Passenger bus	
		77 D	3,5 to	
Sum				
1923		15	0,75 to	
		70 H	2,5 to	
		80	4 to	
		68 D	5 to	
		150 A	7,5 to	
		51 D	25 Passenger bus	
		25 B	1,5 to	
Sum				
1924		15	1 to	
		25 B	1,5 to	
		70 H	2,5 to	
		80	4 to	
		51 D	29 Passenger bus	
		68 D	5 to	
		151 A	5 to	
		30	1,5 to	
		50	2,5 to	
Sum				
1925		15	1 to	
		30	1,5 to	
		50	2,5 to	
		80	4 to	
		68 D	5 to	
		151 A	5 to	
		51 D	29 Passenger bus	
		51 D	30 Passenger bus Chassis	
		KB	17 Passenger bus Chassis	
		CB	30 Passenger bus Chassis	
		51 D	29 Passenger bus Chassis	
Sum				

== Superior Body Company (1925–1940) ==
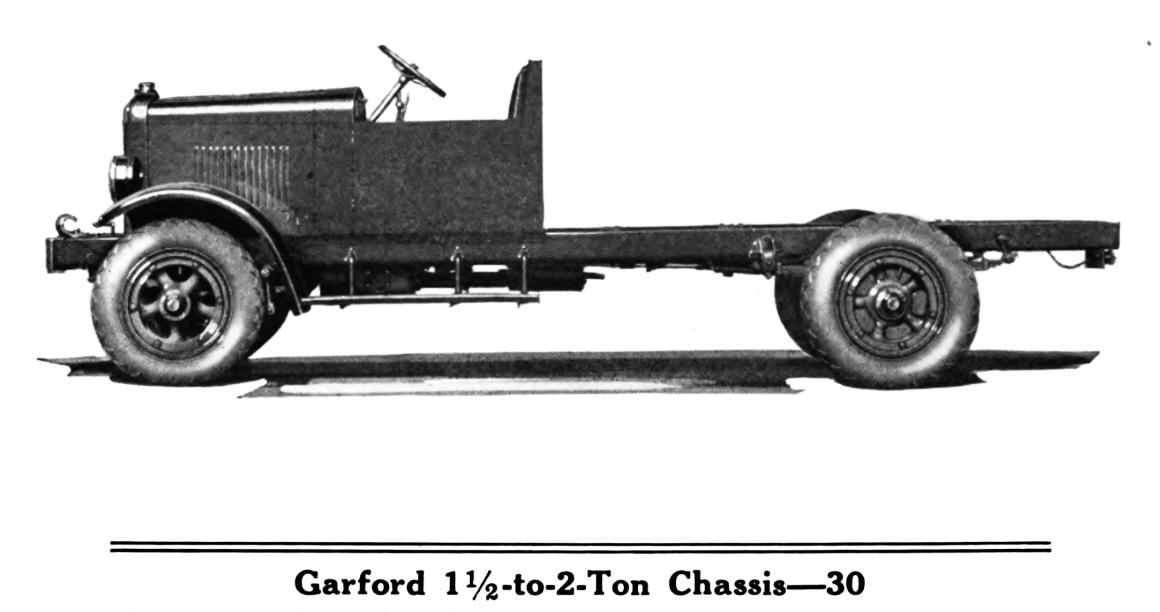
Garford 30 (1928)

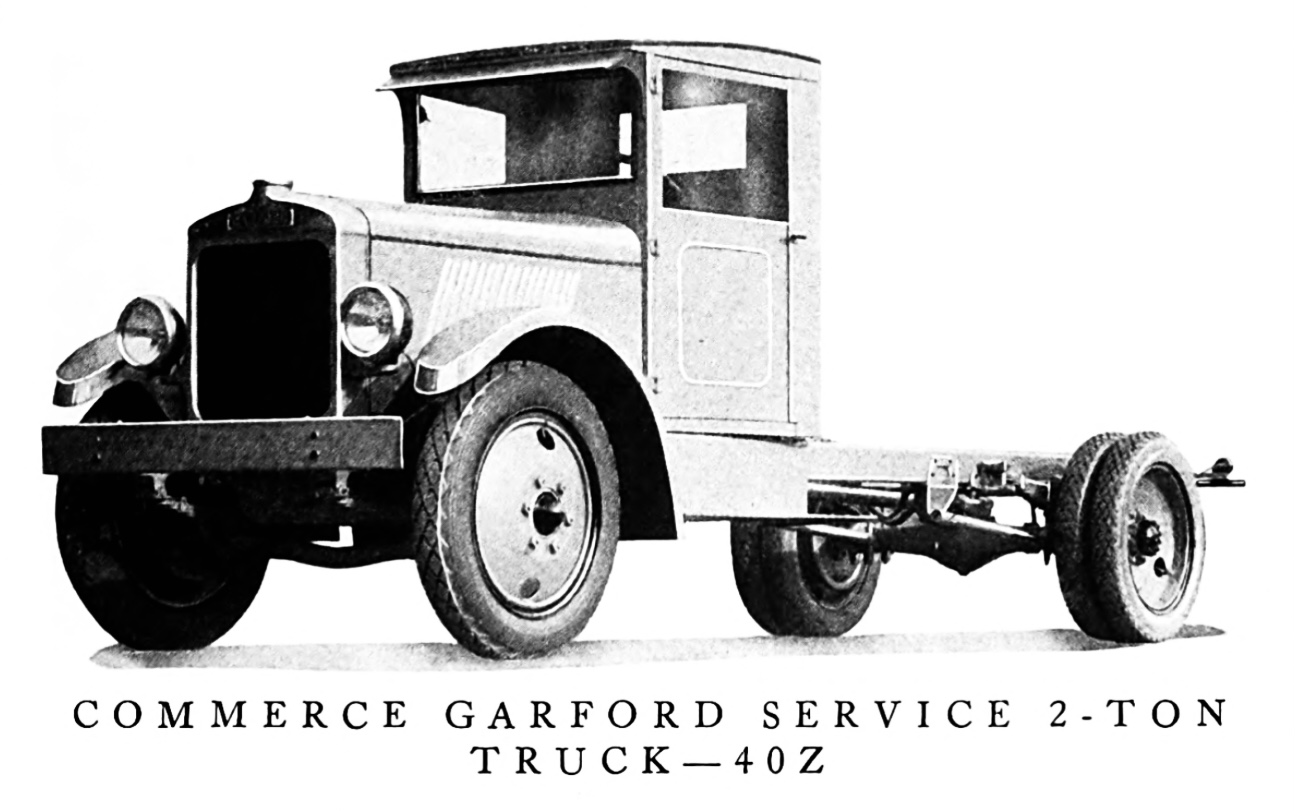
Garford 40 Z (1929-1930)

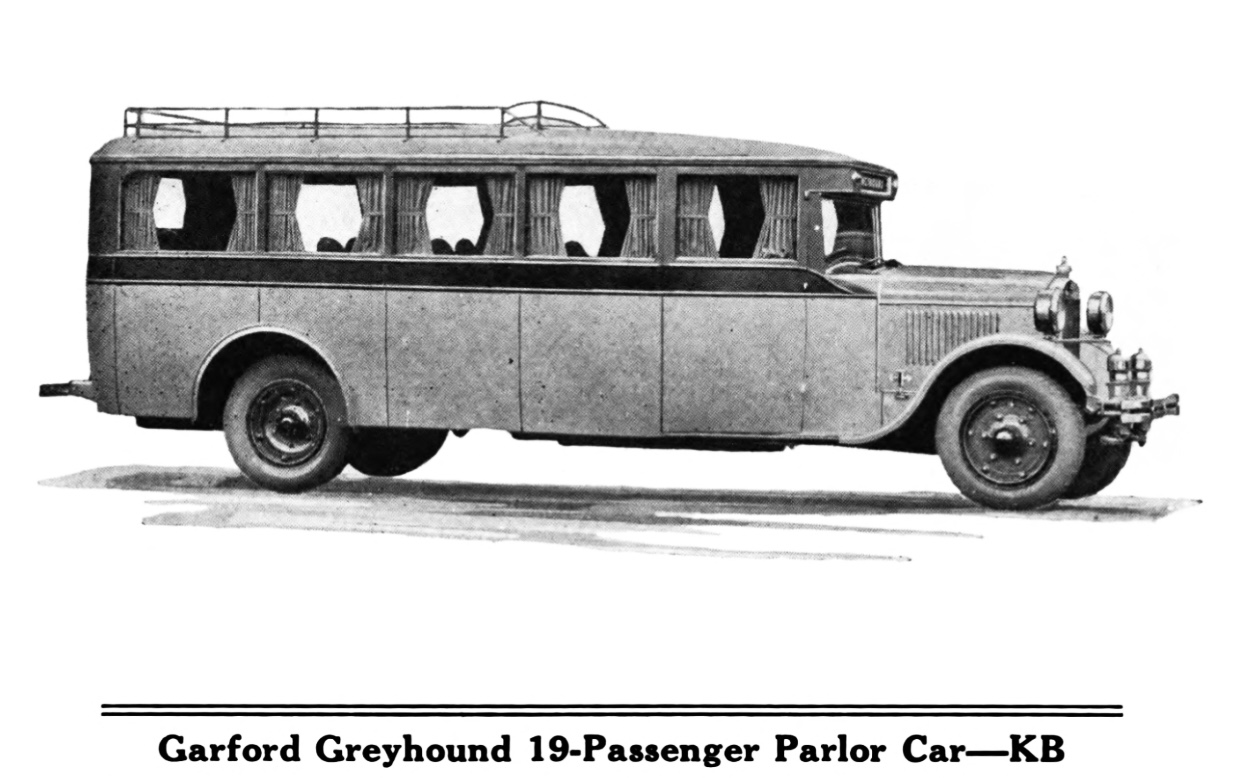
Garford KB (1928-1930)

During the early 1920s, Garford moved its operations to Lima, Ohio. In 1925, Garford Motor Truck changed its name to the Superior Body Company and opened a new plant housing a large manufacturing facility and administrative offices. The company diversified, introducing a line of hearse and ambulance bodies (known as professional cars) and becoming a major producer of school bus bodies for the U.S. and Canada, as well as export markets.

For its professional-car platforms, Superior signed an agreement with Studebaker, thus gaining instant access to some 3000 dealers and Studebaker's chassis engineering. The company had continuing success for several years, and on the strength of this arrangement, rose to a prominent position in the professional-car business. By 1930, Superior and Studebaker had the only complete line of professional cars in the North American market.

In 1938, having achieved success and having established a dealer network of its own, Superior left the partnership with Studebaker and began building bodies on General Motors platforms.

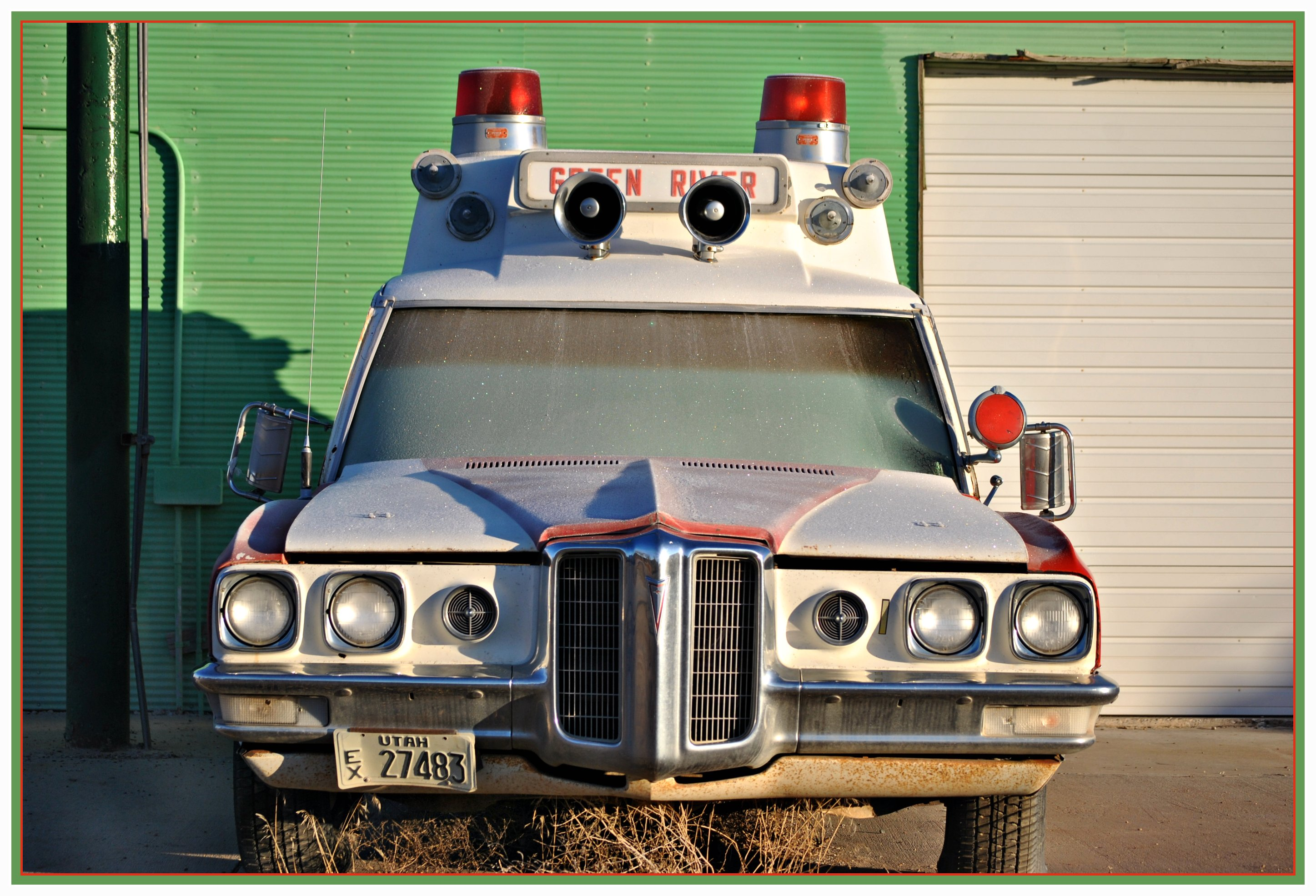
Superior Coach Company ambulance body on 1970 Pontiac Bonneville commercial chassis

== Superior Coach Company (1940–1980) ==
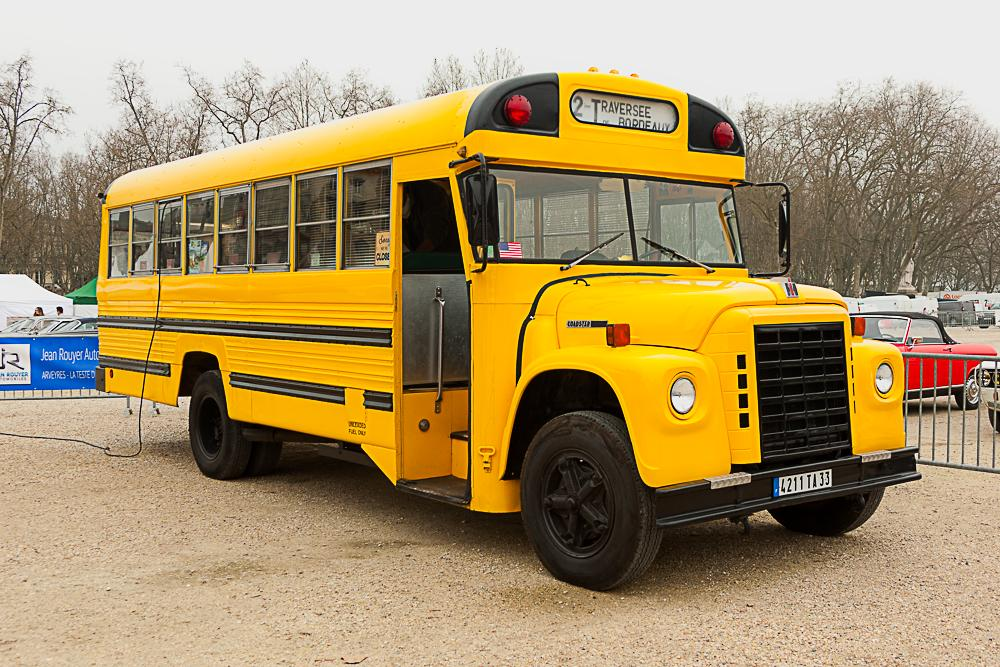
Pre-1979 Superior school bus on International Loadstar chassis

In 1940 the company changed its name again, to Superior Coach Company. School bus bodies were built primarily on Chevrolet/GMC, Dodge, Ford, and International Harvester truck chassis. In 1951 the Lima facility was expanded and a new facility in Kosciusko, Mississippi was opened.

=== Sheller-Globe Corporation ===
In 1969 Superior was acquired by the Sheller-Globe Corporation, an industrial conglomerate and auto parts maker based in Toledo, Ohio.

The 1977 model year saw a major downsizing in the Cadillac automobile chassis used for the professional car business. In addition to being smaller, Cadillac's commercial chassis was significantly more expensive. Superior and other ambulance and funeral car manufacturers had to design new bodies and retool their factories, resulting in much higher consumer costs. The ambulance sector switched to larger van-based vehicles or and truck chassis. 1977 also brought new Federal Motor Vehicle Safety Standards for school buses built after 1 April, which increased both costs and engineering challenges. At the same time, a downturn in North American school bus purchase volumes began as the children of the Baby Boom generation completed their elementary and secondary educations.

By 1980, Superior was one of the six major school bus body manufacturing companies in the United States, competing with Blue Bird, Carpenter, Thomas, Ward, and Wayne, as well as Gillig and Crown whose buses were primarily sold on the West Coast. Bidding competition for reduced volumes became devastating to profits and even liquidity; in 1979, Ward declared bankruptcy, reorganizing as AmTran the following year, which later became IC Bus.

Faced with these challenges, school bus industry overcapacity, the loss of ambulance business in the professional car sector, and decreased sales of funeral coaches due to higher production and sales costs, Sheller-Globe liquidated its Superior Coach-related investments in late 1980, and portions of its assets were sold.

== Post-liquidation ==
After Sheller-Globe announced the closure of its Lima bus and professional car manufacturing operations in 1980, several small businesses purchased portions of the assets, and carried on successfully with several product lines.

=== School buses ===
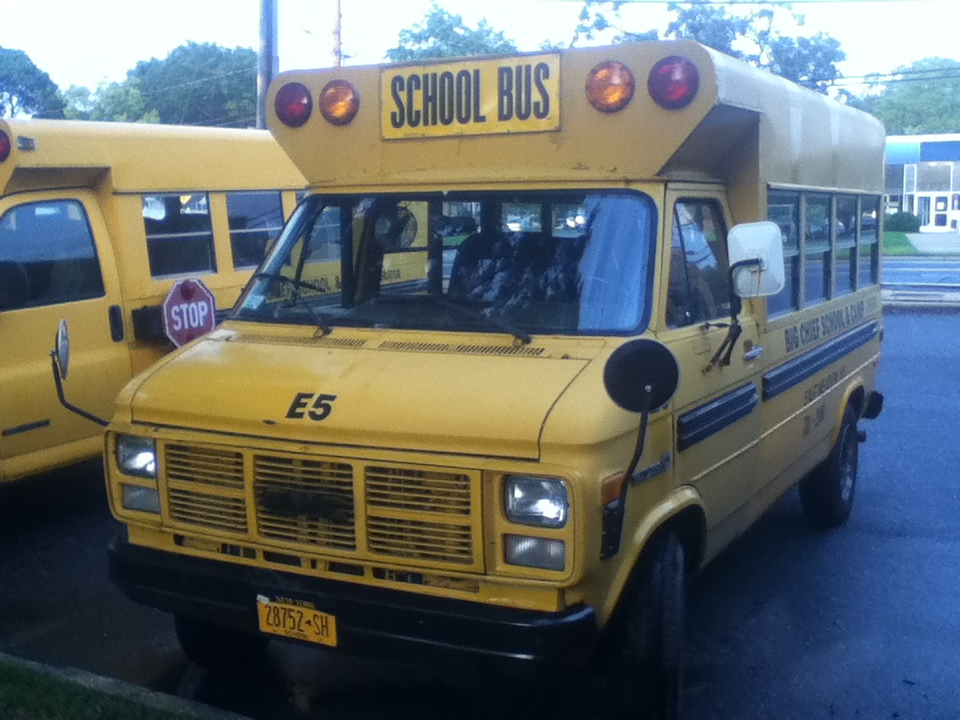
1987 Superior School Bus on GMC G30 chassis

Although large school bus manufacturing was discontinued with the 1980 model year, Mid Bus—a new small business based in Lima organized by three former employees—resumed production of the smallest Superior school buses, beginning with a workforce of seven people. The business grew successfully, and after a move to a much larger facility at Bluffton, Ohio, it was acquired by Collins Industries in 1998.

=== Accubuilt ===
In 1981 Superior's hearse business was sold to Tom Earnhart. Later that year, it was merged with the largest competitor, the S&S Coach Company. This formed a new company, S&S/Superior of Ohio, to oversee the further development of the two businesses. Manufacturing operations were consolidated at Superior's plant in Lima, which had been expanded 30 years earlier.

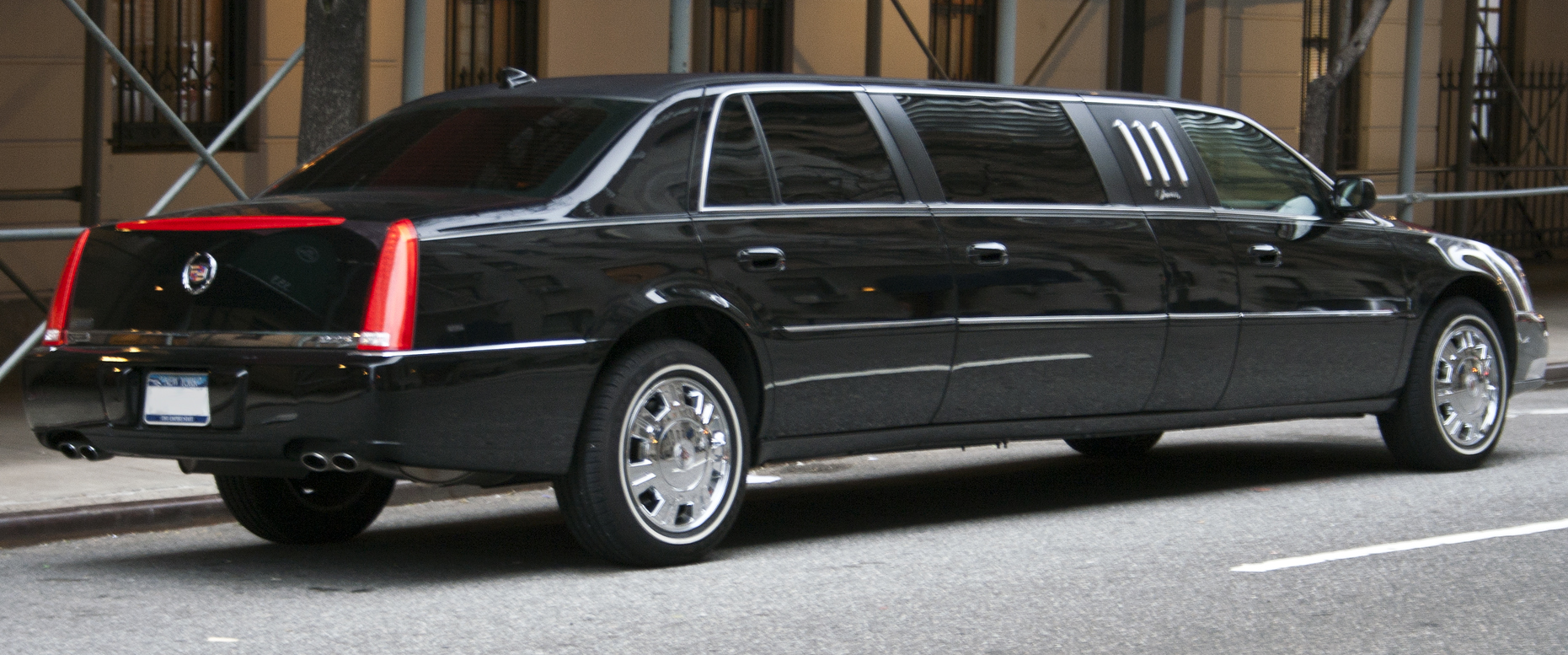
2010 Cadillac DTS stretch limo, built by Superior

As of 2007, S&S/Superior now operates as a division of Accubuilt, using the Superior Coach trade name for its line of funeral cars and specialty vehicles. Accubuilt's 200,000-square-foot (19,000 m^{2}) flagship facility was also the exclusive production plant for the W.P. Chrysler Executive Series 300, a longer-wheelbase version of the Chrysler 300. In late 2017 Accubuilt was purchased by Sean Myers, owner of Armbruster Stageway, and was once again named S&S/Superior Coach Company.

Accubuilt's Limousine Division also operates a facility in Springfield, Missouri, that manufactures limousines with wheelbase extensions up to 130 inches (330 cm).

=== Superior Credit Union ===
The credit union for the Superior Coach Company's employees, now known as Superior Credit Union, grew in the decades following the company's closure to become the fourth largest credit union in Ohio.

== Bus products ==
Van based;

- Ford Econoline
- Chevrolet/GMC G30
- Dodge

Type A (Partner);
- Ford Econoline chassis

The partner only lasted for one year.

Type B (Pacemaker);
- Chevrolet P30 chassis

Type C (Pioneer);
- Chevrolet/GMC B-Series chassis
- Ford B-Series chassis
- International Loadstar chassis (1962–1978)
- International Harvester S-series "Schoolmaster" chassis (1979–1985)

Type D (SuperCruiser)
- International Harvester chassis
- front and rear-engine models

== Carrollton bus disaster ==
In 1988, nearly a decade after Sheller-Globe exited the school bus manufacturing business, a Superior bus was involved in a disastrous crash. The bus had been built only nine days before the more stringent 1977 Federal Motor Vehicle Safety Standards would have required better collision protection of the fuel tank, a wider central aisle for better access to the emergency door, and other safety improvements. Although no legal determination of product liability was ever made, Sheller-Globe and Ford Motor Company each contributed substantially to the settlement funds for those injured and the families of those who were killed. As of 2010, the Carrollton bus disaster remained one of the two worst bus accidents in U.S. history.

The accident and the legal battle afterward were recounted in a 1994 book by James S. Kuen. Reckless Disregard: Corporate Greed, Government Indifference, and the Kentucky School Bus Crash was published by Simon & Schuster of New York City. (ISBN 0-671-70533-4)

== See also ==
- Arthur Garford
- Garford-Putilov Armoured Car
- Studebaker-Garford
