= Superior Credit Union =

Credit union in Ohio, USA

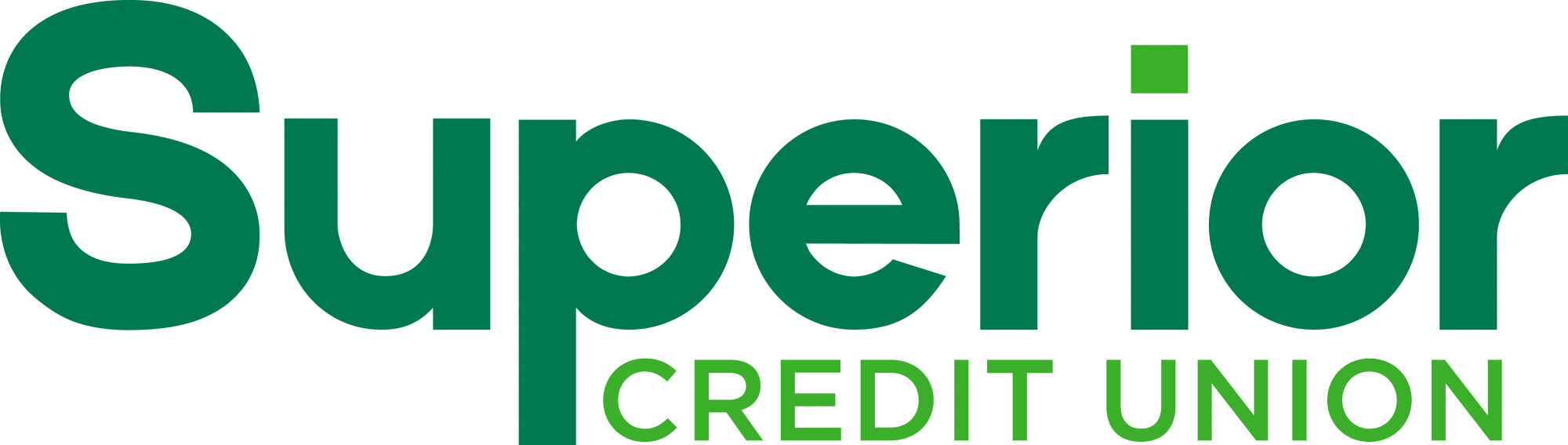
- Named after: Superior Coach Company
- Formation: 1954
- Type: Credit union
- Legal status: Non-profit
- Headquarters: Lima, Ohio
- Region served: Western Ohio
- President & CEO: Phil Buell
- Website: superiorcu.com

Superior Credit Union is a credit union serving Cincinnati, Toledo, and Lima, Ohio, and surrounding regions. It originally served employees of the Superior Coach Company, and after the latter closed in 1981 it expanded by absorbing other credit unions and extending its geographic footprint from Lima to a wide area of western Ohio.

As of July 2026, it is the fifth-largest credit union in Ohio by assets.

== History ==
It was founded as Superior Coach Employees Federal Credit Union in 1954 to serve employees of the Superior Coach Company, based in Lima, Ohio. When Superior Coach Corporation closed in 1981, the credit union obtained a community charter expanding its membership eligibility to residents of the City of Lima, changing its name to Lima Superior Community Federal Credit Union. During the 1980s it absorbed five other credit unions, and expanded its membership to employees of several other companies.

During 1990–1994 its field of membership expanded to encompass all of Allen County, and in 1999 to neighboring Auglaize County. In 2004, it expanded into four more counties and renamed itself Superior Federal Credit Union. During 1995–2014 it absorbed four more credit unions. It increased from one to five locations during the 1990s, and had ten locations in 2012. It expanded into mortgage services in 1999 and small business services in 2005.

In 2015, it changed from a federal charter to a state charter, renaming itself Superior Credit Union. This change made it easier for the credit union to expand its geographic scope, as federal rules were directed towards metropolitan areas rather than rural areas. Its scope expanded to 22 counties in western Ohio, and during 2015–2019 it absorbed six credit unions, allowing it to expand into the Cincinnati and Toledo metropolitan areas. It tied for fourth in the number of mergers nationwide among credit unions during June 2016 to June 2021. Many of these credit unions had not previously offered mortgage services, but provided means for growth in Superior's mortgage program. It also purchased a bank branch in Clifton, Cincinnati, along with its accounts and deposits, a move which is unusual for a credit union but was possible due to its high capitalization. It also expanded its real estate services by acquisition.

As of 2026, Superior has been named the 63th Best Performing Credit Union in the United States. The credit union was also ranked second in the state of Ohio and first in western Ohio, where it currently serves its members and communities.
