= Mid Bus =

Defunct American bus manufacturer

Mid Bus Corporation
- Predecessor: Superior Coach Company
- Founded: 1981
- Defunct: 2007
- Fate: Dissolved by parent company
- Headquarters: Lima, Ohio (1981–1995); Bluffton, Ohio (1995–2007)
- Area served: North America
- Products: school buses
- Parent: Collins Bus Corporation
- Website: http://www.midbus.com/

Mid Bus was a corporation which specialized in manufacturing customized school buses. Formed in 1981 by former employees of Superior Coach Company in Lima, Ohio, it grew from a dozen employees working in a small facility in Lima to become one of the country's largest manufacturers of smaller school buses, moving to a much larger facility a few miles north of Lima in 1995.

The company was acquired by Collins Bus Corporation in 1998. On September 19, 2007, Collins announced plans to close the Mid Bus plant in Ohio and consolidate all manufacturing at the Collins facility in Kansas.

== History ==
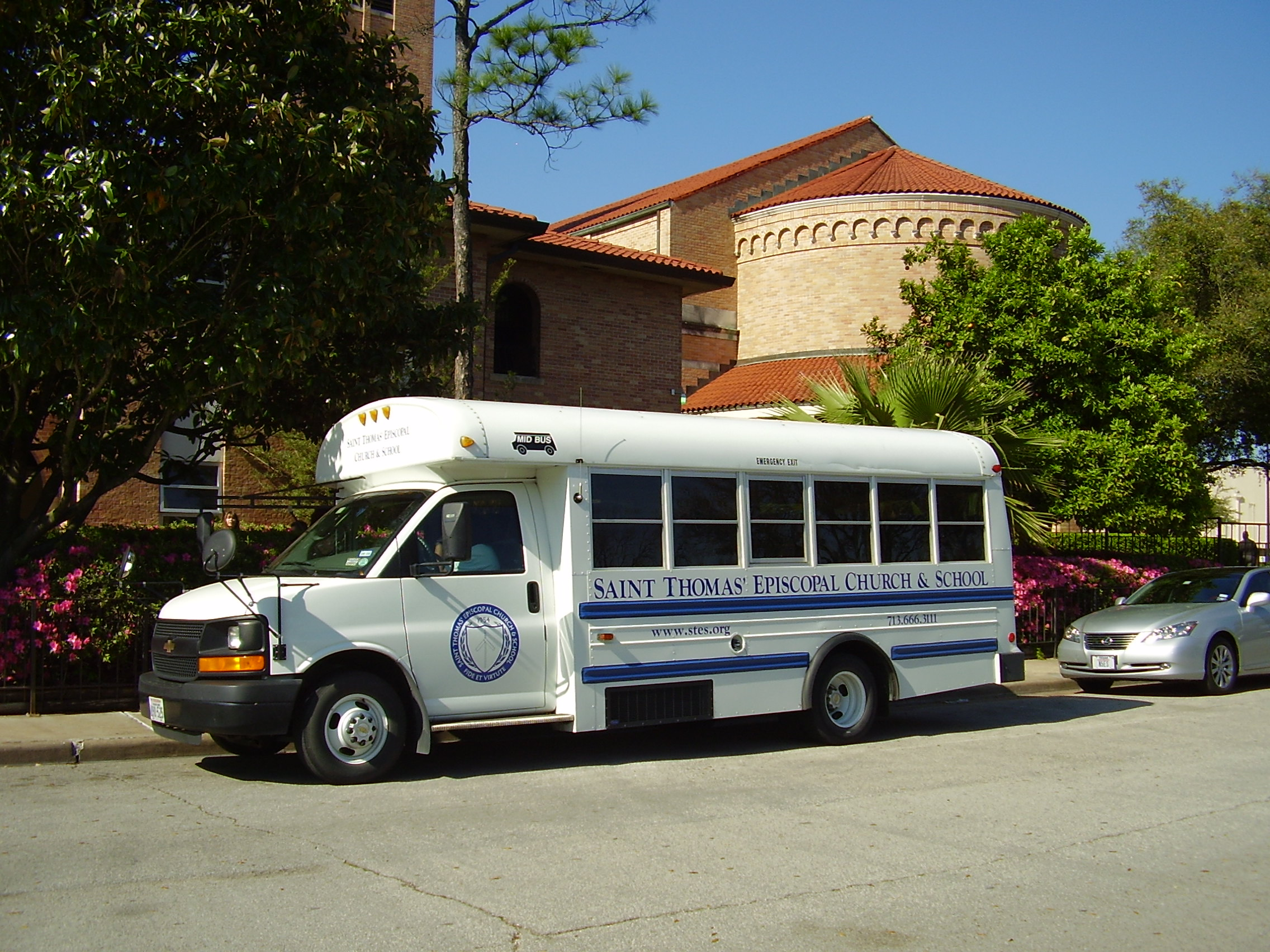
Mid Bus Guide DW

In 1980, in the United States, there were six major school bus body companies building large school buses, mostly making bodies for chassis from four truck manufacturers, joined by two coach-type school bus builders on the West Coast. Most also made some smaller buses of various types. With the baby boom years which swelled the ranks of school children in the past, the manufacturing industry faced serious over-capacity as companies vied and competed for lower volumes of purchases.

In 1981, when Sheller-Globe Corporation, a diversified industrial conglomerate closed down its large Superior Coach Company bus factory in Lima, Ohio, two former Superior managers, Lynn Metzger and Gary Geren along with a former Superior and Carpenter manager, Fred Barrington created Mid Bus, manufacturing Superior's smallest Type A bus under the new "Superior by Mid Bus" brand name.

Initially, they had a seven other former employees of the large factory, and worked in a small shop on Wayne Street in Lima, OH. As other small bus products were added, Superior by Mid Bus was shortened to Mid Bus. In the mid-1980s, the company acquired the Minuteman product line from AmTran (formerly Ward Body Company) and in the early 1990s, the tooling and product rights to Busette from Wayne Corporation. They also developed products of their own design to expand the product offering.

After a succession of larger facilities in Lima, around 1995, the company moved to a much larger facility in Bluffton, Ohio. Mid Bus became a subsidiary of Collins Industries, a publicly traded stock company, in 1998.

On November 4, 2002, Mid Bus unveiled the Guide XL at the NAPT show. The Guide XL is manufactured on the General Motors C5500. On September 19, 2007, Collins announced plans to close the Mid Bus plant in Ohio and consolidate all manufacturing at the Collins facility in Kansas. The Mid Bus production facility in Bluffton, Ohio was closed on November 9, 2007, and the production was moved to Collins' facility in South Hutchinson, Kansas.

== Products ==
Mid Bus product ranges
Product name	Production	Chassis	Vehicle type	Notes	Photos
Mid Bus product line (1981–2007)
Superior	1981–199?	Chevrolet/GMC Van?	School bus		Superior
Guide	199?–2007	Chevrolet/GMC G30	School bus MFSAB	Single rear wheel Dual rear wheel	Guide
SC (School Coach)	199?–2002	International 3400	School bus	Mid-size bus 10–48 passengers of seating capacity	
Guide XL	2002–2007	Chevrolet/GMC 4500/5500	School bus	Mid-size bus 10–42 passengers of seating capacity	
Guide series (2007–2012)
Guide	2007–2012	Ford E-350 Chevrolet/GMC G30	School bus MFSAB	Single rear wheel	
Super Guide	2007–2012	Ford E-350 Chevrolet/GMC G30	School bus MFSAB	Dual rear wheel	
Grand Guide	2007–2012	Ford E-350 Chevrolet/GMC G30	School bus MFSAB	Dual rear wheel Flat floor	
