= Collins Industries =

American bus manufacturer

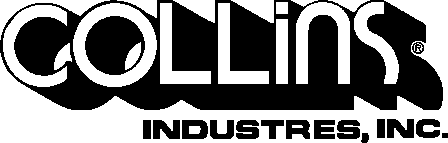
- Formerly: E-CON-O Conversion
- Industry: Automotive
- Founded: 1967; 59 years ago in Kansas City, Missouri
- Founder: Don Collins, Sr.
- Headquarters: 415 West 6th Street, South Hutchinson, Kansas, U.S.
- Area served: North America
- Products: School buses
- Parent: Forest River
- Subsidiaries: Mid Bus (defunct); Corbeil Bus Corporation (defunct); American Fire Appatus (defunct)
- Website: www.collinsbus.com (official bus website); www.collinsind.com (corporate website, archived)

Collins Industries is an American bus manufacturer headquartered in South Hutchinson, Kansas. Best known for production of yellow school buses, the company produces buses for multiple applications; all bodies designed by the company have been cutaway van chassis-based short buses.

Collins was founded in 1967 by Don Collins Sr. as E-CON-O Conversion; originally a part of Collins Industries, the company exists today as a wholly owned subsidiary of manufacturing company Forest River (A Berkshire Hathaway company). All production is sourced from the company's 94,000 square-foot facility in South Hutchinson, Kansas.

== History ==
=== 1970s ===
In 1967, Don Collins founded E-CON-O Conversion in Kansas City, Missouri, becoming one of the first to develop a school bus derived from a van. Utilizing a Ford Falcon van (Econoline passenger van), Collins shifted away from designs based upon utility vehicles such as the Chevrolet Suburban and International Harvester Travelall.

In 1971, Collins renamed E-CON-O to Collins Industries, coinciding with the expansion of its product range into ambulances. In 1972, the company was relocated to Hutchinson, Kansas (its present-day location).

In 1978, Collins acquired fire apparatus manufacturer American Fire Apparatus.

=== 1980s ===
In 1982, Collins introduced its first bus with a wheelchair lift; in a shift away from van conversions, the company adopted bodies for cutaway van chassis, introducing the long-running "Bantam" product line. In the mid-1980s, the company would diversify its product ranges. To replace the Collins van-based ambulances, the company acquired Wheeled Coach Industries in 1984 (inventor of the modular ambulance) and Capacity of Texas (a terminal tractor manufacturer) in 1985.

In 1986, Collins sold its American Fire Apparatus division.

=== 1990s ===
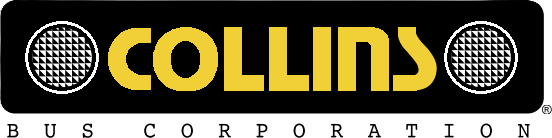
Collins logo (c.1994–2007)

During the 1990s, Collins Industries grew to become the largest manufacturer of Type A small school buses in the United States. In 1998, the company would acquire its largest competitor, Mid Bus (a successor of the bus manufacturing operations of Superior Coach Company). To expand into the transit bus segment, Collins acquired World Trans, Inc, basing their vehicles on cutaway chassis and rear-engine chassis.

In 2000, the company purchased Waldon Manufacturing, renaming it after its Lay-Mor street sweeper.

=== 2000s ===
During the 2000s, the existence of Collins would transition significantly, shifting from a parent company to a subsidiary within a transportation conglomerate. Although specializing solely in small buses, in 2000, Collins offered the widest product line of any American bus manufacturer, with three different versions of the Bantam.

A publicly traded company since 1983, Collins Industries became privately held in October 2006. 80 percent of the company was acquired by BNS Holding Inc, with the investment group American Industrial Partners holding the other 20 percent.

In 2007, Collins purchased the assets of Quebec-based manufacturer Les Enterprises Michel Corbeil out of bankruptcy. As with its Mid Bus acquisition a decade before, Collins shifted production of Corbeil buses to its Kansas facility, repackaging it as a product range marketed in Canada. Also, the Mid Bus plant in Bluffton, Ohio were closed and shifted to Collins' facility. Both subsidiaries adopted the Bantam bodywork, marketed as the Mid Bus Guide and Corbeil Quantum, respectively.

=== 2010s ===
Collins logo (2007–present)

In 2010, American Industrial Partners formed Allied Specialty Vehicles out of four of its transportation holdings, including Collins and its subsidiary companies. Under ASV, Collins was part of a conglomerate including fire/emergency vehicles, recreational vehicles, transit and school buses, and industrial vehicles. In 2015, Allied Specialty Vehicles was renamed the REV Group, and went public in 2017.

By the end of 2010, the Collins facility was rebuilt after it was damaged on June 7, 2009.

On March 29, 2012, Collins unveiled the Nexbus series, replacing the long-running Bantam series; the first Nexbus was produced on May 16, 2012. In place of the former Guide and Quantum, all three Collins brands adopted Nexbus branding. In 2014, Collins starting manufactured the Nexbus using the Ford Transit 350/350HD chassis. By 2016, Collins retired the Mid Bus and Corbeil brands entirely, using the Collins brand across North America.

For 2018, Collins introduced the Collins Low Floor variant of the Nexbus body. The first school bus derived from the Ram ProMaster body, the Low Floor is equipped with a flat floor and a folding wheelchair ramp.

=== 2020s ===
In January 2024, REV announced it would be exiting the bus manufacturing business. The company reached an agreement to sell Collins to Forest River for $303 million.

In 2023, Collins launched an all-electric school bus using the Ford E-Transit chassis, The first ever battery electric Ford Transit School bus with access for 25 students, a wheelchair lift is also an option to allow handicapped riders.

== Products ==
Collins Bus product ranges
Product name	Production	Chassis	Vehicle type	Notes	Photos
Bantam series (1982–2012)
Bantam	1982–2012	Ford E-350 Chevrolet G30	School bus MFSAB	Single rear wheel	Bantam 422
Super Bantam	c.1992–2012	Ford E-350 Chevrolet G30	School bus MFSAB	Dual rear wheel	Super Bantam
Grand Bantam	c.1996–2012	Ford E-350/450 Chevrolet G30	School bus MFSAB	Dual rear wheel Flat floor	Grand Bantam
Bantam XL	2003–c.2005	Chevrolet 4500/5500	School bus MFSAB	Designed by Mid Bus	
Nexbus series (2012–present)
Nexbus	2012–present	Ford E-Series Ford Transit Chevrolet Express/GMC Savana	School bus MFSAB	Available in single rear-wheel (Nexbus SRW) and dual rear-wheel (Nexbus DRW) bodies Offered in several alternative-fuel configurations: Nexbus Hybrid on Ford E450 chassis in conjunction with Azure Dynamics.; Nexbus Propane (since 2009), on GM chassis, in conjunction with Clean Fuel USA.; Nexbus Electric- Set to be introduced on Ford E450 Chassis using a motiv power systems.; Nexbus CNG- Ford & GM chassis using a CNG fueled system (compressed natural gas).	Nexbus (Chevrolet Express chassis)
Low Floor	2018–202?	Ram ProMaster 3500	School bus	Single rear wheel First school bus produced with a low-floor configuration. Utilizes a wheelchair ramp (in place of lift).	
