= Prestolite Electric =

Manufacturing

Prestolite Electric Inc.
- Type: Private
- Industry: Heavy Duty (automotive)
- Founded: 1911
- Headquarters: Novi, Michigan, United States
- Number of locations: 5
- Key people: Michael Shen (CEO)
- Products: Alternators; Starter Motors; Regulators; 48v - 800V Motor/Generators
- Owner: Broad Ocean Motors
- Divisions: North America; Asia Pacific; Europe
- Website: www.prestolite.com

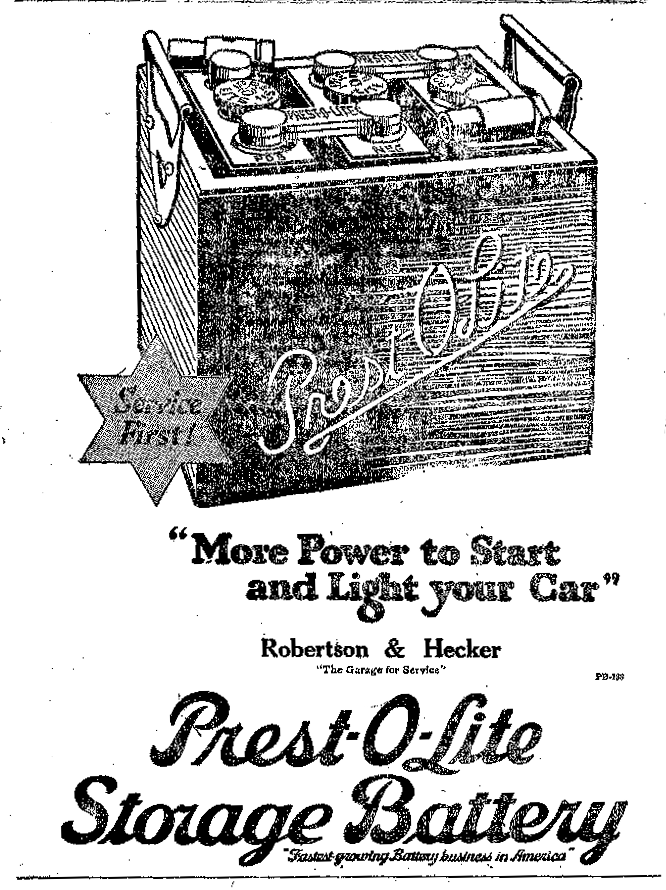
1921 Prest-O-Lite car battery ad from Canada.

Prestolite Electric Incorporated is a global manufacturer and supplier of alternators, starters, electrical equipment, and services to the transportation, industrial, military, marine, agricultural and construction industries. The company sells its products to United States defense agencies, OEMs, and aftermarket suppliers under the Indiel, Leece-Neville, and Prestolite Electric brand names. The company operates production and engineering facilities in China, Europe and the United States. Prestolite Electric is privately owned by Broad Ocean Motors. 1990 filed bankruptcy and new entity established. The Prestolite name was taken thru the process as the name had market value

== History ==
1911	Electric Autolite was founded. The company produced a generator to power early day auto lamps. Original equipment customers: Studebaker, Packard, and Indiana Buggy Works.
1927	Electric Autolite acquires Prest-O-Lite Battery Company from The Union Carbide Corporation which produced automotive batteries. Electric Autolite's products were expanded to include: Starting Motors, Generators, Regulators, Ignition Systems, Wire and Cable Products, and Spark Plugs.
1961	The name "Autolite" is sold to Ford.
1963	Electric Autolite Company merges with the Merganthaler Linotype Company and the Eltra Corporation was formed. Former Autolite phase of company becomes the Prestolite Motor and Ignition Company.
1980	Eltra Corporation is acquired by the Allied Signal Corporation.
1986	Prestolite Motor and Ignition is purchased by investors, forming Prestolite Electric, Inc.
1987	July: Prestolite acquires the Leece-Neville division of Sheller-Globe Corporation of Cleveland, Ohio. The Toledo, Ohio operations become part of the alternator products division.
1987	July: Prestolite acquires Beech Electric Corporation and Beech Electric California, Inc. (Formed Megatron Machinery, Division of Prestolite Remanufacturing).
1987	August: Prestolite acquires RCP Machinery Manufacturing, Inc. and Megatron Industries.
1987	November: Prestolite acquires Butec Limited in Leyland, England (Manufacturer of heavy duty alternators and starting motors).
1988	January 29: Prestolite acquires Arcade, New York, facility and automotive operations of Motorola primarily consisting of electrical instruments and alternators.
1990–1994	Cleveland, Ohio and Gainesville, Georgia plants of Leece-Neville are merged, and operations are moved to the Arcade, New York facility.
1994–1997	Prestolite Acquires Lucas Electric in UK, Argentina, and South Africa.
1999	Prestolite purchases Robert's Remanufacturing in Garfield, New Jersey.
2001	March: Prestolite Electric (Beijing) Limited "PEBL" was established.
2004	May: First Atlantic Capital acquires Prestolite from Genstar Capital Corporation.
2008	October: Prestolite sells remanufacturing operations back to Robert's Remanufacturing.
2014	January: Broad Ocean Motor acquires Prestolite Electric's China operations (PEBL) and Ophoenix Capital Management (OCM) acquires Prestolite Electric's remaining world operations.
2015	May: Broad Ocean Motors acquires Prestolite's remaining world operations (US and UK Divisions) outright.

== The Prestolite name ==
The following companies have been spun off under the Prestolite name and are no longer controlled by Prestolite Electric:

- Prestolite (spark plugs) "Autolite" name sold in 1961 to the Ford Motor Company (who in turn is forced to sell it to Bendix by the early 1970s).
- Prestolite Welding Equipment, formally Hobart Brothers of Troy, Ohio.
- Prestolite Wire, division was sold in 1985.
- Prestolite Battery sold to Exide in 1997.

The following Prestolite divisions were sold to Ametek in 2000:

- Prestolite Motors (specialty direct current motors).
- Prestolite Switch (instruments, switches & contactors).
- Prestolite Power (power systems & battery chargers).
