= Leece-Neville =

- Company type: Private
- Industry: Heavy Duty (automotive)
- Founded: 1909
- Founder: Bennett M. Leece
- Headquarters: Cleveland, Ohio, United States
- Products: Alternators; Starter Motors; Regulators
- Owner: Zhongshan Broad-Ocean Motor Co., Ltd.
- Parent: Prestolite Electric
- Website: www.prestolite.com

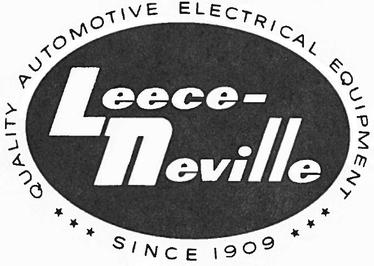
Leece-neville old logo

Leece-Neville is a global manufacturer and supplier of alternators, starters, electrical equipment and services to the transportation, industrial, military, marine, agricultural and construction industries. Leece-Neville serves as a division of Prestolite Electric.

== History ==
=== Early history ===
The Leece-Neville co. was organized in 1909 by Cleveland inventor Bennett M. Leece and financier Sylvester M. Neville. Incorporated in 1910 with capital of $61,000, Leece-Neville opened at 2069 E. 4th St. in Cleveland, Ohio. The company moved to 5363 Hamilton Ave. in 1915. In 1918, Leece had developed a self-starting ignition system, for which he received the patent for that year. Leece-Neville starters and electrical systems were standard position for the Haynes Automobile Company.

=== Post war era ===
The company flourished during World War II, producing electrical starters, generators, and Voltage regulators for airplanes, trucks, and industrial and marine equipment. After the war, the company pioneered the use of the alternator on municipal vehicles such as fire trucks, police cars, and buses. By 1950, the company held 56 patents, and with the introduction of the alternator on passenger cars in 1960, company growth and expansion continued. In 1955, Leece-Neville purchased a plant at E. 51st St. and St. Clair to expand production, and in 1959, established a plant in Gainesville, Georgia.

== Mergers and acquisitions ==
- In 1969, Leece-Neville merged with Victoreen Inc, and became a subsidiary of the VLN Corp.
- In 1974, Cleveland-based VLN Corporation was merged into Sheller-Globe Corporation. VLN's Leece-Neville divisions supplied heavy-duty alternators, starter motors, and fractional horse power motors for automotive and industrial customers.
- It July 1987, Prestolite Electric acquires Leece-Neville from the Sheller-Globe Corporation Corporation.
- In the early 1990s, the Cleveland and Gainesville plants of Leece-Neville are merged, and operations are moved to Arcade, New York.
- On April 7, 2015, Prestolite Electric, LLC announces that Zhongshan Broad-Ocean Motor Co., Ltd. (Broad-Ocean Motor) completed its acquisition of Prestolite Electric, LLC and its subsidiaries.
