= Weis Manufacturing Company building =

- Weis Manufacturing Company
- U.S. National Register of Historic Places
- Michigan State Historic Site
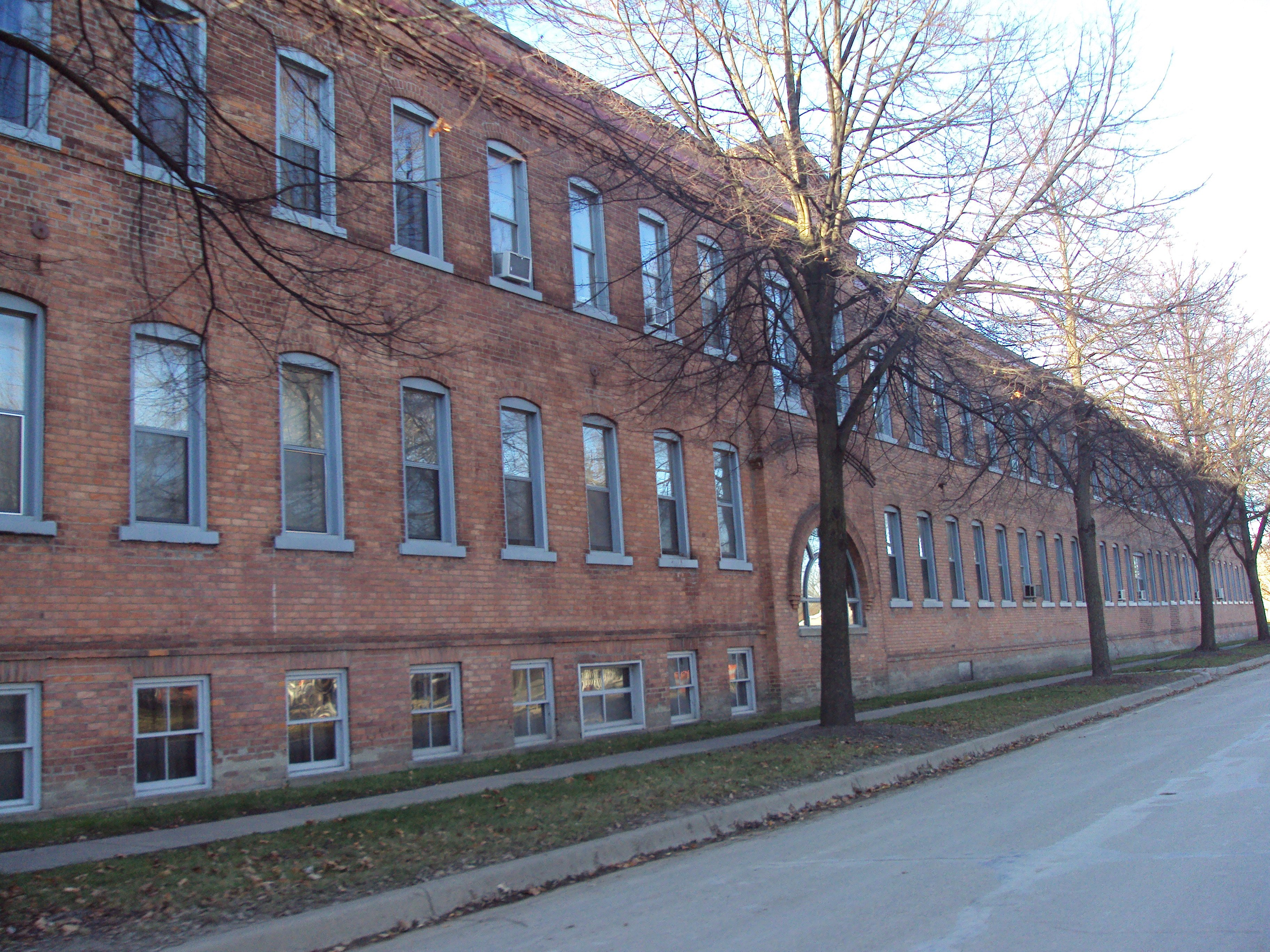
- View of the main building from Union Street; the original north wing is to the right.

- Location within Michigan Location within the United States
- Interactive map
- Location: 800 West 7th Street; Monroe, Michigan
- Coordinates: 41°54′56″N 83°24′39″W
- Built: 1905
- NRHP reference No.: 81000313
- Added to NRHP: October 26, 1981

The Weis Manufacturing Company, currently known as WoodCraft Square, is a former factory located at 800 West 7th Street (at the intersection with Union and originally the building used an address of 61 Union) in the city of Monroe in Monroe County, Michigan. It was listed as a Michigan Historic Site and added to the National Register of Historic Places on October 26, 1981.

== Early history ==
The factory complex was constructed between 1905 and 1912 for Weis Binder Company, originally from Toledo, Ohio. It was built along with many other new industries during Monroe's sudden economic growth at the turn of the twentieth century. The original section of the plant was completed in 1905, and the factory began producing file folders, cardboard binders and index cards in early 1906, with a staff of 60 people. A few years later, the company began constructing wooden bookcases and other office furniture. The company made an addition in 1909, doubling the floor space. Business boomed, and a few years later another addition was constructed.

When completed in 1912, the complex consisted of three main buildings for a total of 120,000 ft^{2} (11,150 m^{2}) and employed 300 people. From 1912 to 1964, the company produced paper and office equipment. In 1964, the complex was purchased by Floral City Furniture Company, a subsidiary of La-Z-Boy, which was based in Monroe. A few years later, the Weis complex was renamed the La-Z-Boy Chair Company. In 1978, the facility was completely vacated when the main La-Z-Boy headquarters on North Telegraph Road expanded to include their own manufacturing complex.

== WoodCraft Square ==
The city of Monroe purchased the unused complex from La-Z-Boy for only $1 in 1980, where it continued to remain abandoned and boarded up for several more years. The city converted much of the main building into a low-income senior citizens residence, although the outside of the structure has remained unchanged since it was originally built. The complex's name was changed to WoodCraft Square and currently has 208 renovated units.

== Description ==
The Weis Manufacturing Company complex contains five brick structures. Three of which are combined into a single building located along Union Street; the other two structures are separate buildings located behind the Union Street section. The three buildings along Union Street are of nearly identical construction, but have varying heights, making them distinguishable from one another.

The northernmost portion of the Union Street building was constructed in 1905/06, and is a two-story, flat-roofed, 30-bay structure with segmentally-arched four-over-four light windows and a corbelled brick cornice. The central portion of the Union Street building, built in 1909, is similar, but sits on a high basement, lifting it above grade. The southernmost portion of the Union Street building, built in 1917, is a fourteen-bay extension of the central wing, and reflects the same design elements, but stands three stories high. However, the elevations of this portion not facing Union Street are dissimilar to the front elevation, and have wide bays of almost floor to ceiling windows separated with brick piers.

The larger of the two structures behind is a three-story, brick, flat-roofed, trapezoidal structure built in 1911. It displays similar design elements to the Union Street buildings. The smaller structure is a former boiler house, and is a single-story rectangular brick building with a gable roof.
