= List of Hillary Clinton 2016 presidential campaign non-political endorsements =

This is a list of notable non-political figures and organizations who publicly indicated support for Hillary Clinton in the 2016 United States presidential election.

Those who indicated their support after Hillary Clinton's presumptive nomination on June 11 are denoted with an asterisk.

== Notable individuals ==
=== Activists, humanitarians, and labor leaders ===
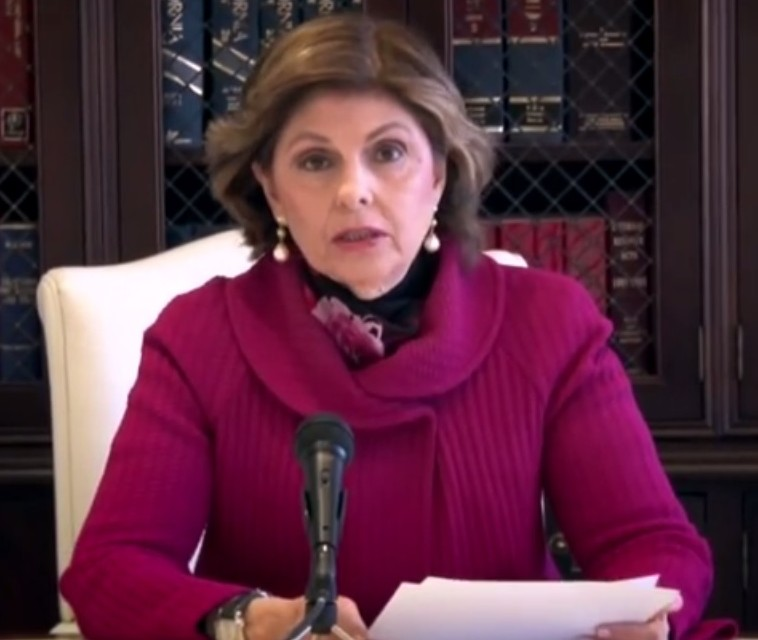
Gloria Allred

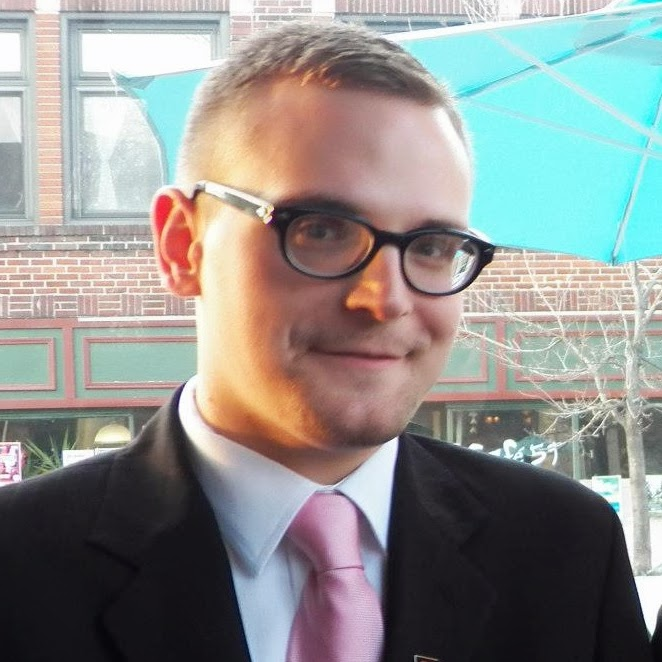
Bryan Ball

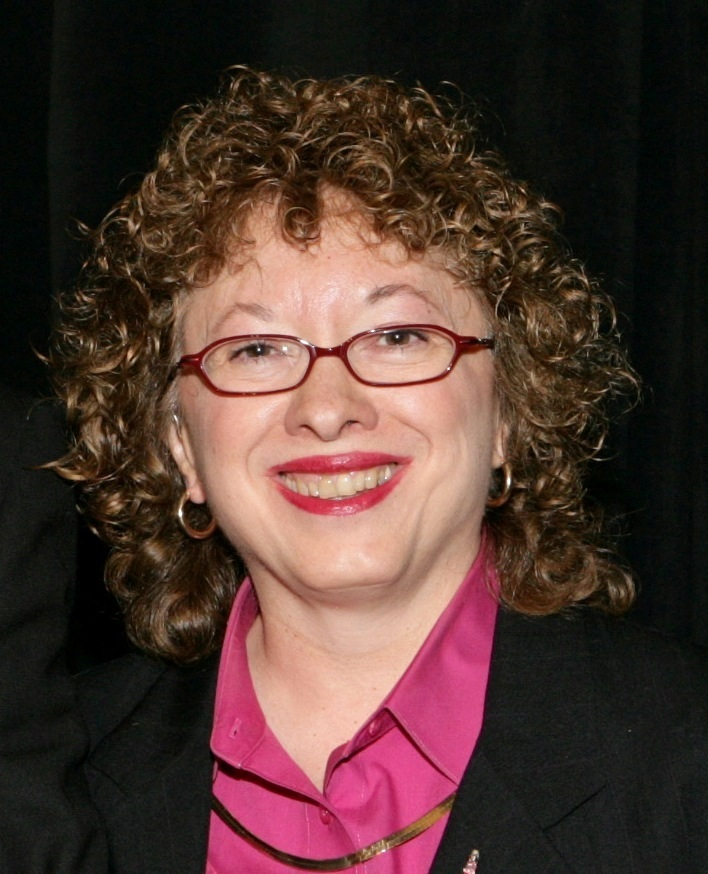
Joyce Bender

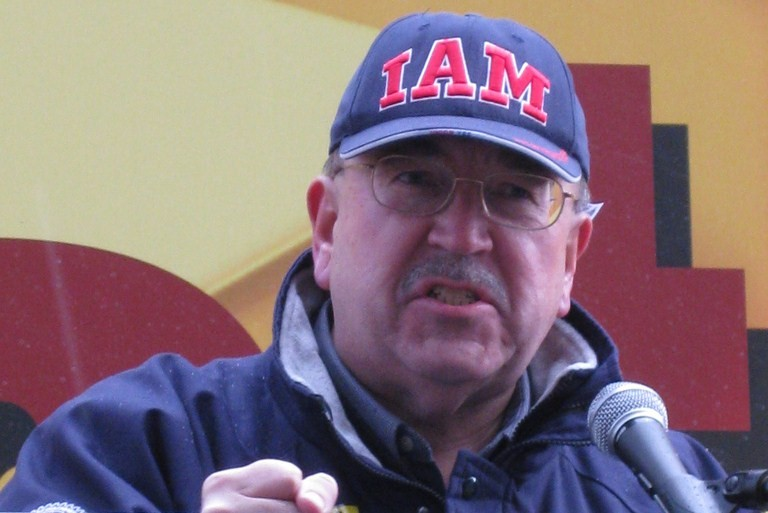
R. Thomas Buffenbarger

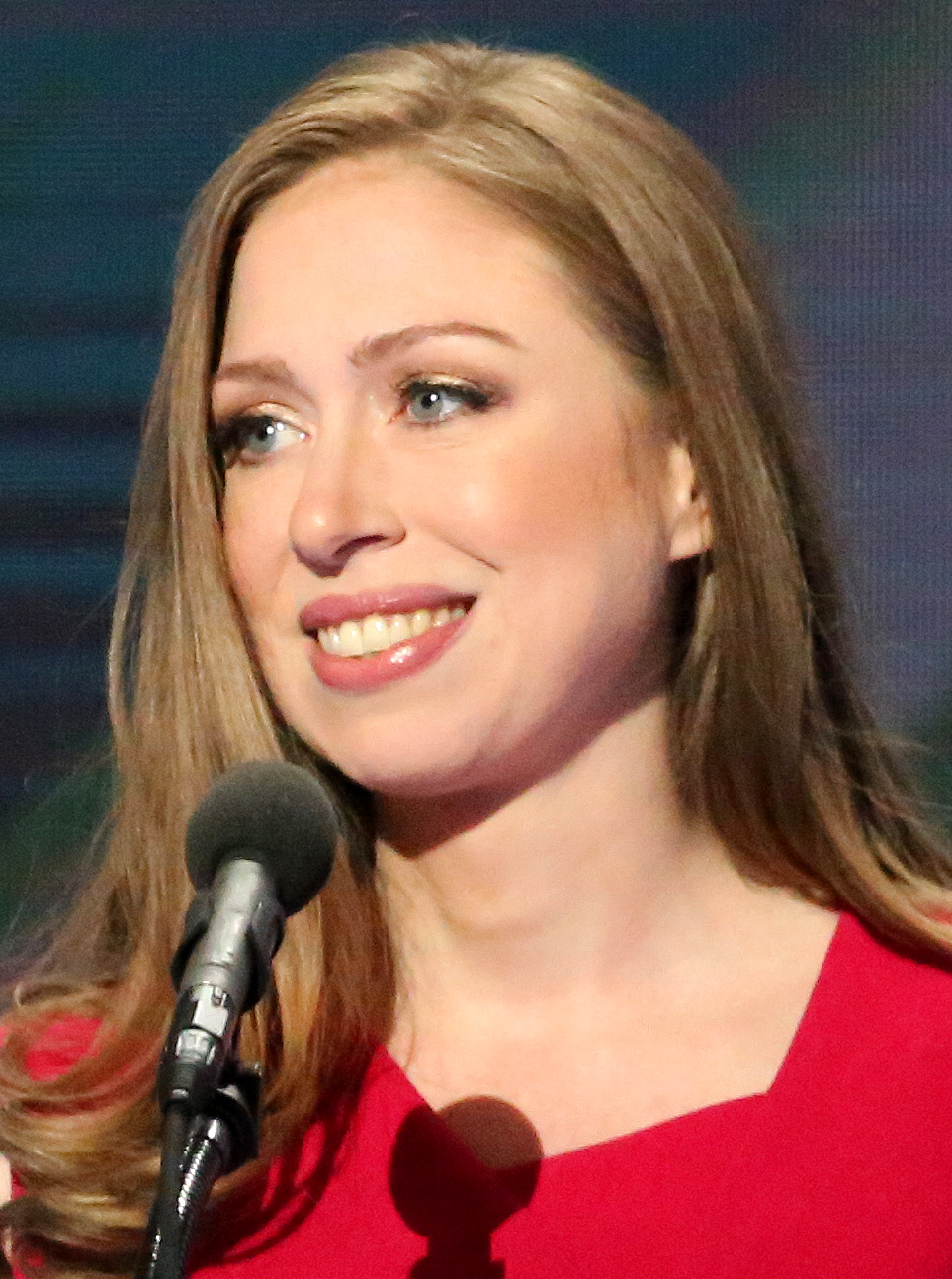
Chelsea Clinton

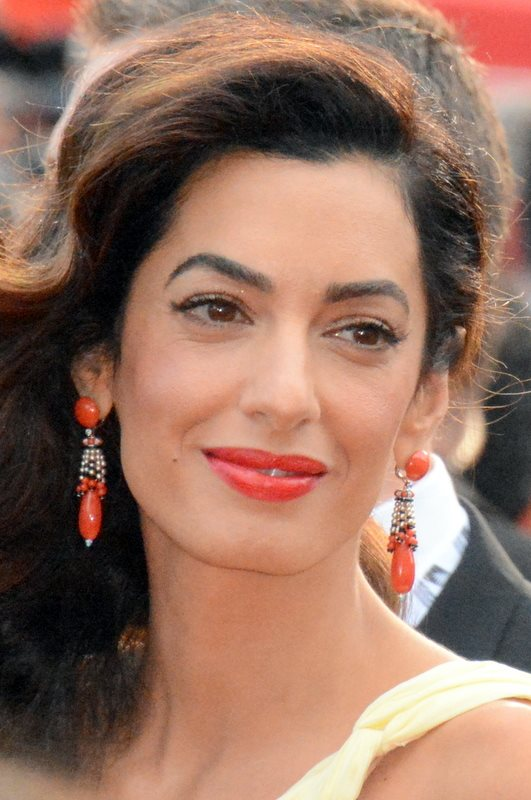
Amal Clooney

Activists for civil and human rights

- Gloria Allred*
- Ruby Bridges*
- Amal Clooney
- Benjamin Crump
- Hazel Dukes, former president: NAACP
- Myrlie Evers-Williams, former chair: NAACP
- Fred D. Gray
- Jesse Jackson,* founder: Rainbow/PUSH
- Ben Jealous,* former president: NAACP
- Vernon Jordan, former president: National Urban League
- Lonnie C. King Jr.
- DeRay Mckesson*
- Janet Murguía,* president: National Council of La Raza
- Billy Murphy Jr.
- Carlotta Walls LaNier*

Activists against bullying, domestic violence, sex trafficking, and gun violence

- Dan Gross, president: Brady Campaign
- Jeff Johnson
- Victoria Reggie Kennedy, co-founder: Common Sense about Kids and Guns

Disability rights activists

- Joyce Bender*
- Marca Bristo*
- Kitty Dukakis
- Ari Ne'eman*
- Donna Nigh

Environmentalists, conservationists, and activists for the welfare of animals

- Wendy Abrams
- Laurie David
- Amy Goldman Fowler
- Gene Karpinski, president: League of Conservation Voters
- Robert F. Kennedy Jr.*
- Bill McKibben*

Faith leaders

- William Barber II,* board member: NAACP
- Deborah Fikes,* board member: NAE
- Menachem Genack, CEO: Orthodox Union Kosher Division
- Bernice King, former president: SCLC
- Sharon Kleinbaum
- Vashti Murphy McKenzie, bishop: African Methodist Episcopal Church
- Ron Sider*
- Alan Solow
- Susan Turnbull, chair: JCPA
- Eric Yoffie, president emeritus: Union for Reform Judaism

Feminists and activists for women's and reproductive rights

- Jaclyn Friedman, founder: Women, Action and the Media
- Ilyse Hogue, president: NARAL
- Lilly Ledbetter, plaintiff: Ledbetter v. Goodyear Tire & Rubber Co.
- Mary Morten, former president: Chicago Abortion Fund
- Terry O'Neill, president: NOW
- Cecile Richards, president: Planned Parenthood
- Kristin Rowe-Finkbeiner, founder: MomsRising.com
- Reshma Saujani, founder: Girls Who Code
- Stephanie Schriock, president: EMILY's List
- Eleanor Smeal, president: Feminist Majority
- Gloria Steinem

Labor leaders

- John Bachtell (Communist)
- Richard Bloomingdale, president: PA AFL–CIO
- R. Thomas Buffenbarger, president: IAM
- Jeffrey David Cox, president: AFGE
- Lily Eskelsen García, president: NEA
- Helen Fabela Chávez
- Thomas Geoghegan*
- Leo Gerard, president: United Steelworkers
- Mary Kay Henry, president: SEIU
- Dolores Huerta, co-founder: UFW
- Jerry Jasinowski,* former president: National Association of Manufacturers
- Douglas J. McCarron, president: UBC
- Eliseo Medina, secretary-treasurer: SEIU
- Michael Mulgrew, president: UFT
- Terence M. O'Sullivan, president: LIUNA
- Lee Saunders, president: AFSCME
- Richard Trumka, president: AFL-CIO
- Randi Weingarten, president: AFT
- Becky Williams, president: SEIU District 1199

LGBTQ rights activists

- Bryan Ball, president: W. NY Stonewall Democrats
- Dana Beyer, executive director: Gender Rights Maryland
- Mary Bonauto, lead attorney: Goodridge v. Department of Public Health
- Ruby Corado
- Brenda Sue Fulton, co-founder: Knights Out, OutServe-SLDN
- Chad Griffin, president: HRC
- David Mixner
- Laura Ricketts, board member: Lambda Legal
- Donna Sachet
- Nadine Smith, CEO: Equality Florida
- Joe Solmonese, former president: Human Rights Campaign
- Theresa Sparks
- Urvashi Vaid
- Carmen Vázquez
- Zach Wahls
- Edith Windsor, lead plaintiff: U.S. v. Windsor

Philanthropists, humanitarians, and non-profit leaders

- Jeannie Baliles,* founder: Virginia Literacy Foundation
- Yael Braun, CEO: Fuck Cancer
- Susan Alice Buffett, former president: Buffett Foundation
- Barbara Bush,* co-founder: Global Health Corps
- James Cox Chambers*
- Dennis Cheng, former CDO: Clinton Foundation
- Chelsea Clinton, vice-chair: Clinton Foundation
- Steve Culbertson, CEO: Youth Service America
- Dagmar Dolby* (Note: Member of the Forbes 400)
- Ruby Duncan, founder: Operation Life
- Irene Hirano, president: U.S.-Japan Council
- John Hope Bryant, founder: Operation HOPE
- Leila Janah,* founder: Sama
- Lynda Bird Johnson Robb*
- Ann Jordan, vice-chair: WETA-TV
- Linda A. Mason, chair: Mercy Corps
- Michelle Obama, founder: Let's Move!
- Ann M. O'Leary
- Laurene Powell Jobs
- Jeff Raikes,* former CEO: Bill & Melinda Gates Foundation
- Tricia Raikes,* co-founder: Raikes Foundation
- Katharine Rayner*
- Shefali Razdan Duggal, council member: U.S. Holocaust Memorial Museum
- Cheryl Saban
- Jack Schlossberg*
- Arlene Schnitzer*
- Jay T. Snyder, founder: Open Hands Initiative
- Jon Stryker, founder: Arcus Foundation
- Pat Stryker
- Paul Twomey, former CEO: ICANN
- Alice Walton
- Maureen White
- Whitney Williams, board vice-chair: Eastern Congo Initiative

Political activists

- Jim Dean, chair: Democracy for America
- Jehmu Greene, former director: Project Vote
- Maya Harris
- Van Jones,* co-founder: Green for All, Color of Change
- Bertha Lewis, former CEO: ACORN
- Brittany Packnett,* co-founder: Campaign Zero
- Annabel Park,* co-founder: Coffee Party USA
- Will Quigg,* grand dragon: Loyal White Knights of the Ku Klux Klan

=== Journalists, commentators, and editors ===
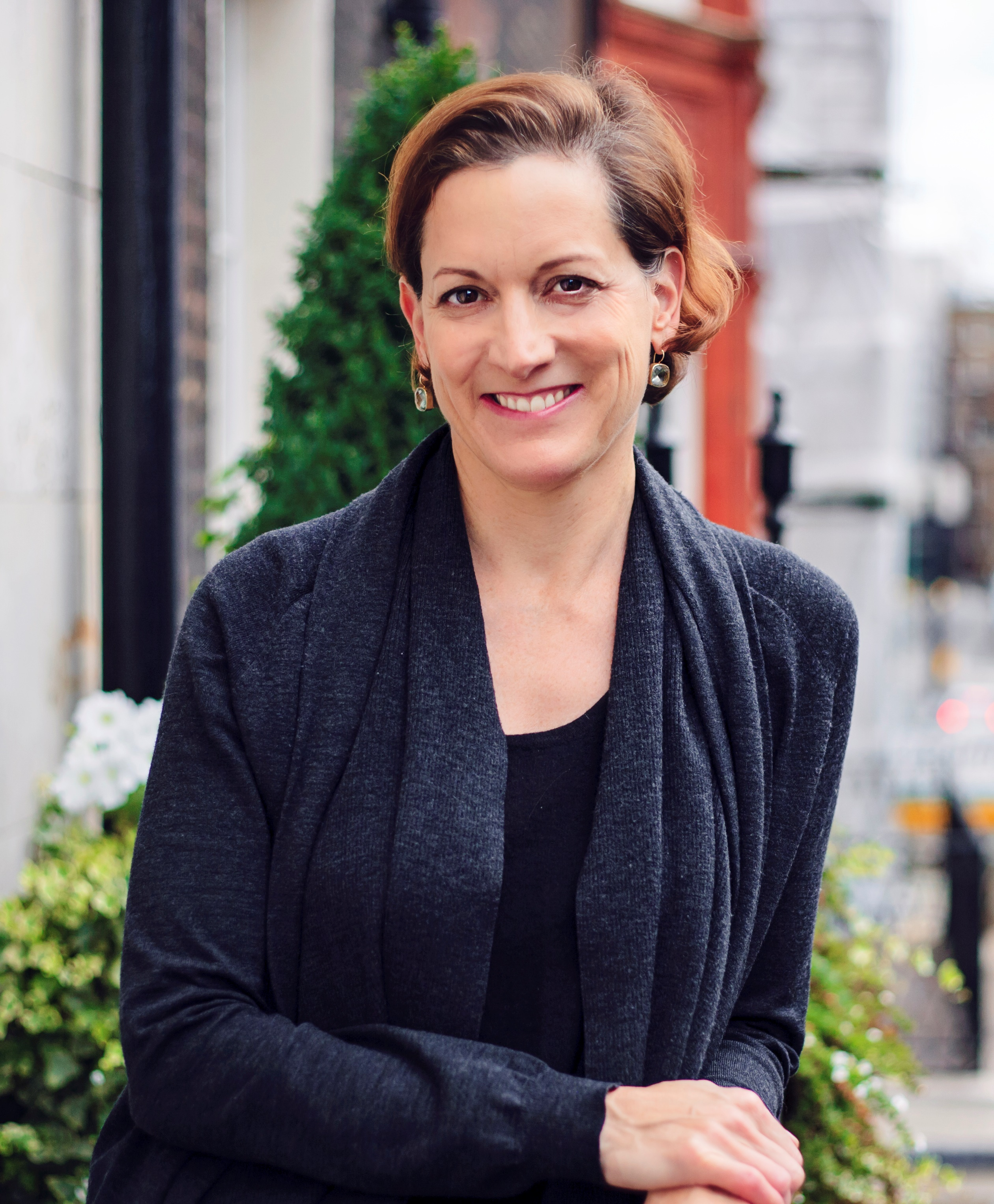
Anne Applebaum

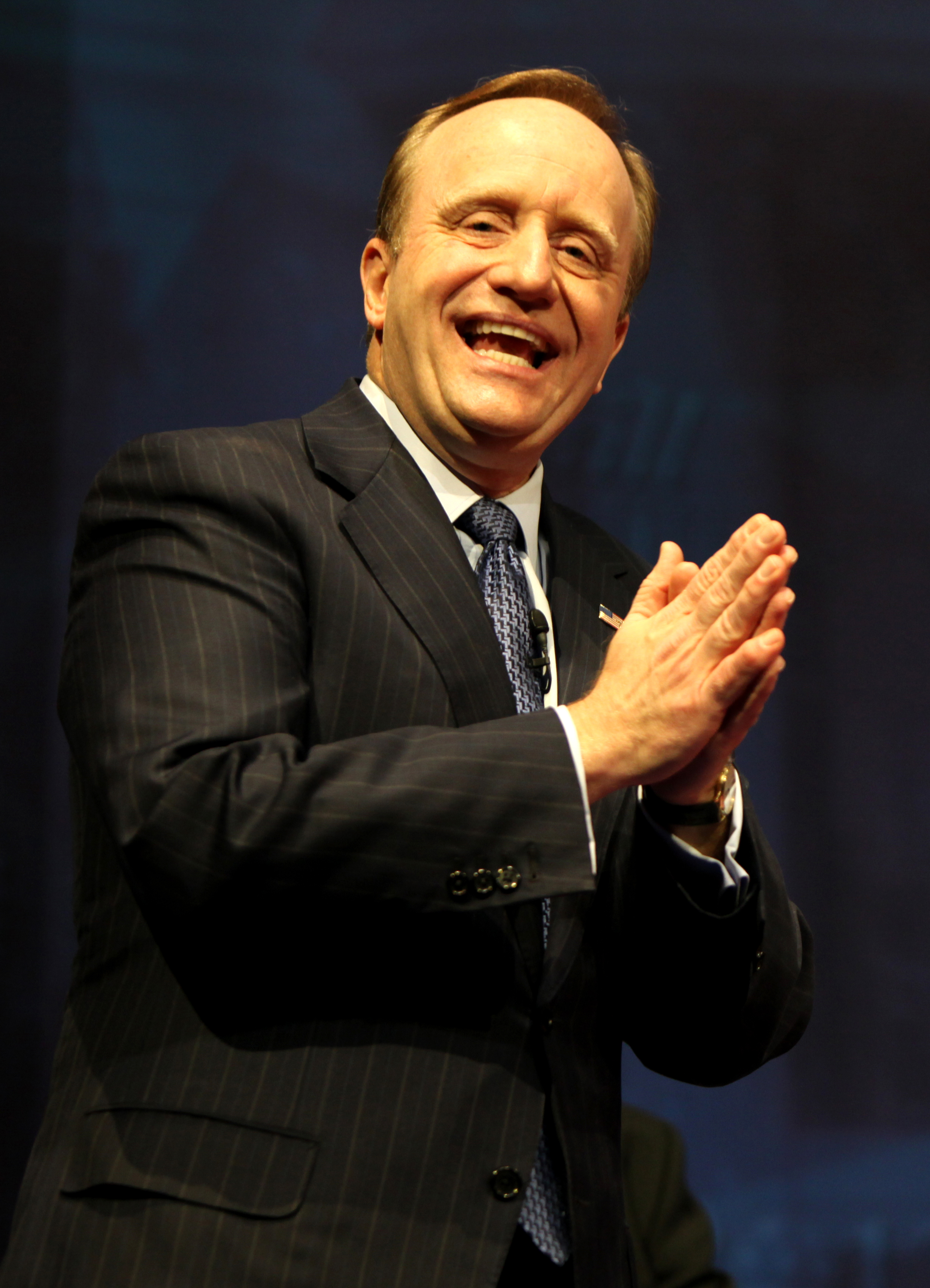
Paul Begala

Bloggers

- Kevin Carson
- Perez Hilton
- Amanda Marcotte
- Robert Marron*

Columnists, commentators, and political satirists

- Paul Begala
- James Carville
- Joe Conason
- Christine Craft
- Kevin Drum
- Karen Finney
- Jonathan Freedland*
- Thomas Friedman*
- Audrey Gelman
- Michelle Goldberg
- Asma Gull Hasan (Republican)
- Cragg Hines
- Earl Ofari Hutchinson
- Harold Jackson
- Owen Jones*
- Shaun King*
- Joe Klein
- David Korten,* co-founder: YES!
- Iris Krasnow
- Barbara F. Lee
- Gene Lyons
- Jay Michaelson
- Jon Miller*
- Stephanie Miller
- P. J. O'Rourke
- Andrea Peyser
- Charlie Pierce*
- Dorothy Rabinowitz*
- Ricky Rosselló
- Andrew Sullivan*
- Tom Toles
- Michael Tomasky
- Janice Turner
- Jessica Valenti
- Lindy West*
- Lamar White

Editors and publishers

- John Aravosis,* editor-in-chief: AMERICAblog
- David Brock, founder: Media Matters for America
- Michaela Angela Davis*
- Jane Eisner,* editor: The Forward
- Bonnie Fuller, editor-in-chief: Hollywoodlife.com
- Tavi Gevinson,* founder: Rookie
- Jack Hitt*
- Roberta Myers, editor-in-chief: Elle
- Gabriel Schoenfeld, former senior editor: Commentary (Republican)
- Paul Starr, co-founder: The American Prospect
- Rebecca Traister
- Katrina vanden Heuvel,* publisher and editor: The Nation
- Jamie Weinstein, senior editor: Daily Caller
- Jann Wenner, (Note: Hall of Fame inductee) co-founder: Rolling Stone
- Katharine Weymouth, former publisher: The Washington Post
- Anna Wintour, editor-in-chief: Vogue
- Andi Zeisler,* co-founder: Bitch Media

Journalists

- Roger Angell*
- Anne Applebaum*
- Willow Bay
- Megan Beyer
- Conor Friedersdorf*
- Tom Junod
- Christina Kahrl
- James Kirchick
- Lisa Ling
- Constantin Seibt*
- Claire Shipman*
- Bret Stephens
- Joan Walsh
- Tom Watson
- Esther Wojcicki, board vice-chair: Creative Commons

=== Leaders in business ===
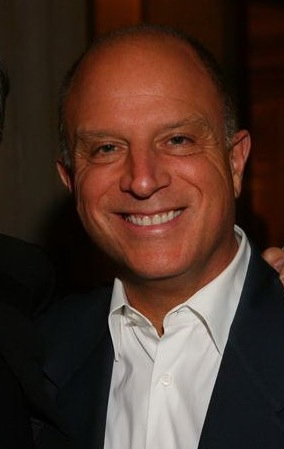
Chris Albrecht

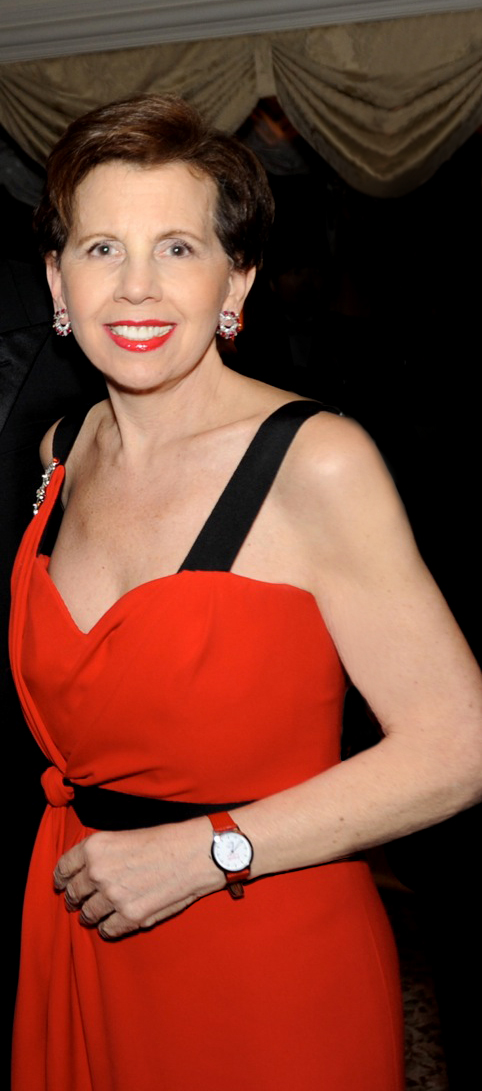
Adrienne Arsht

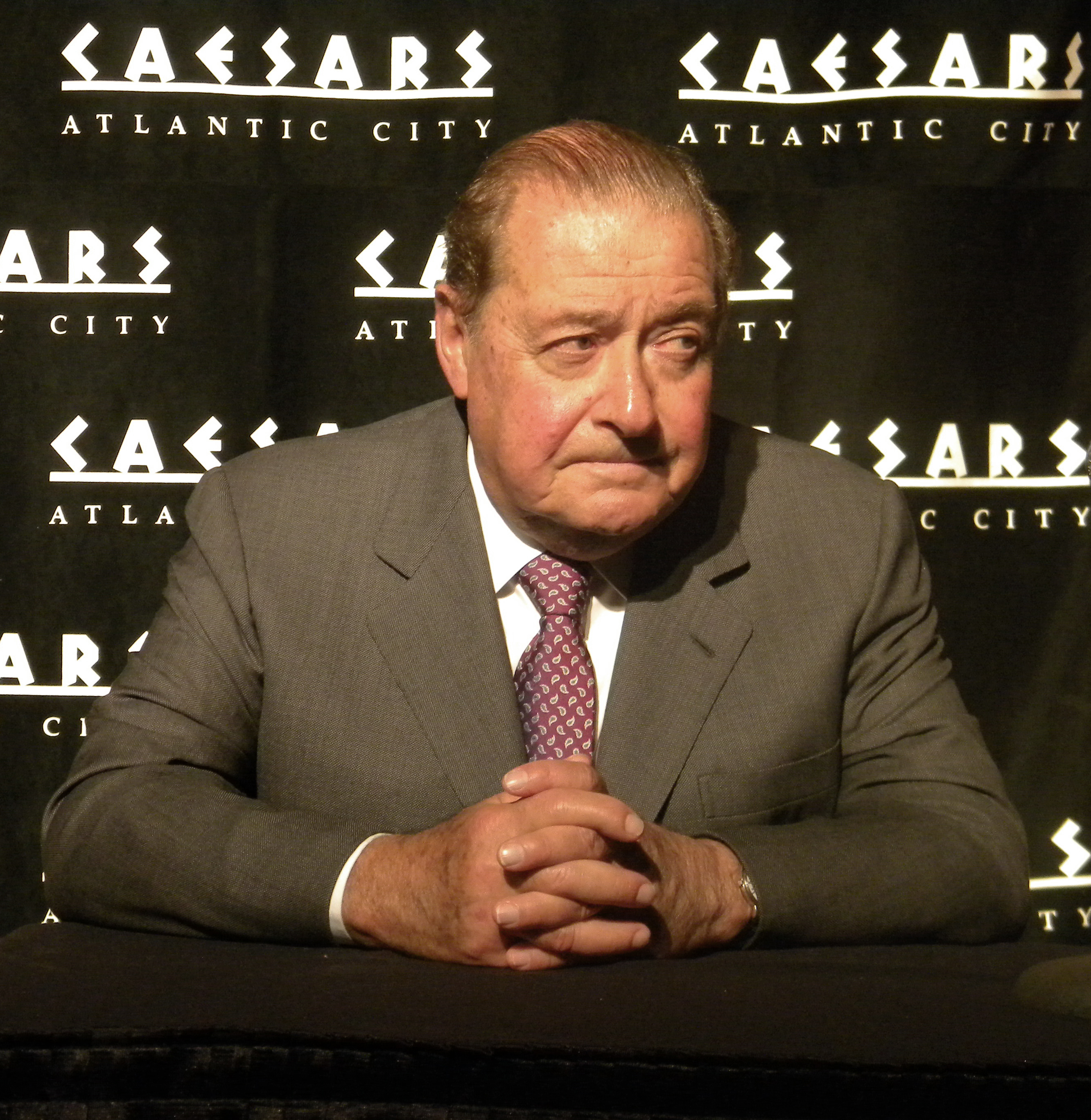
Bob Arum

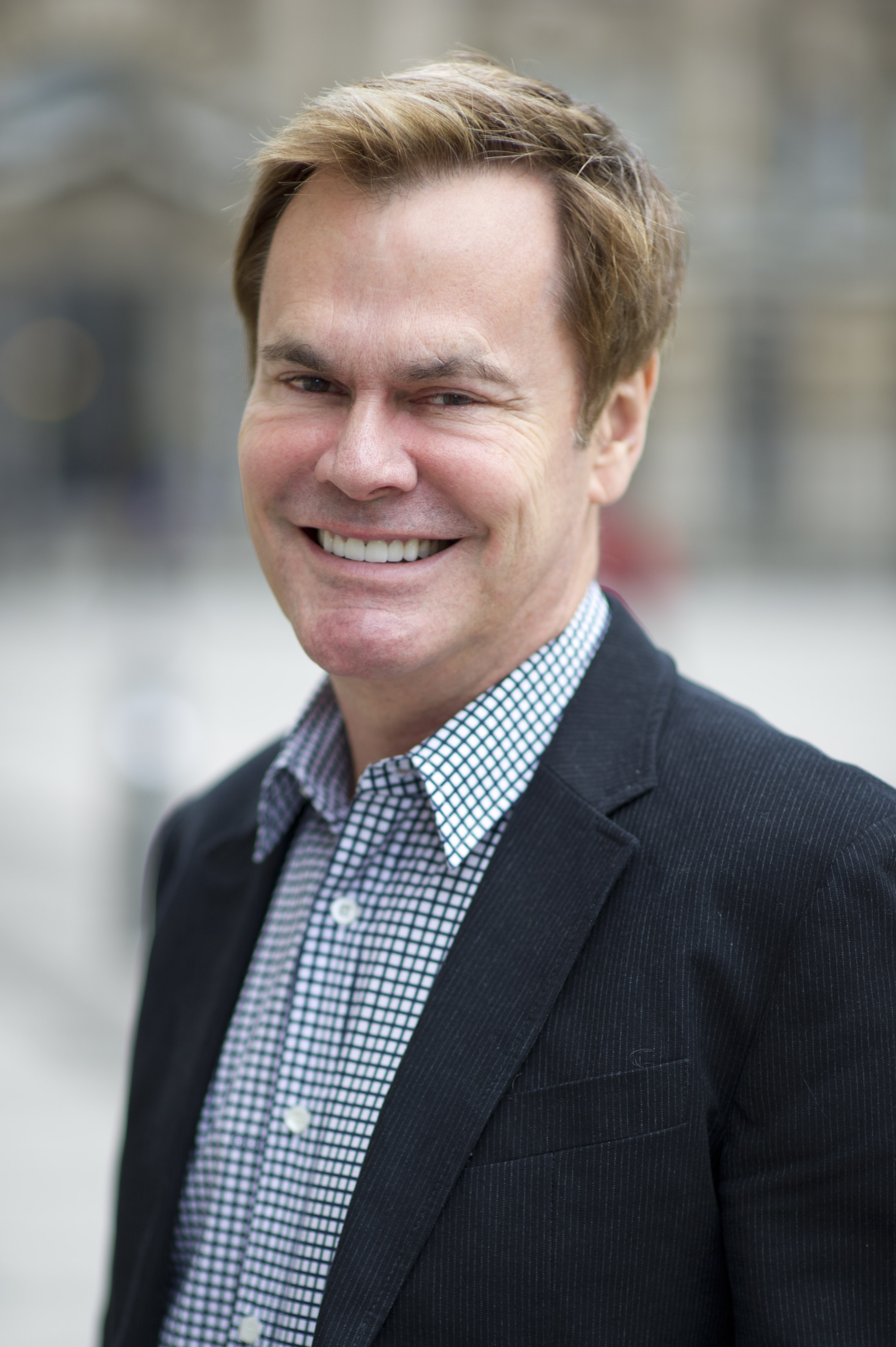
Bruce Bastian

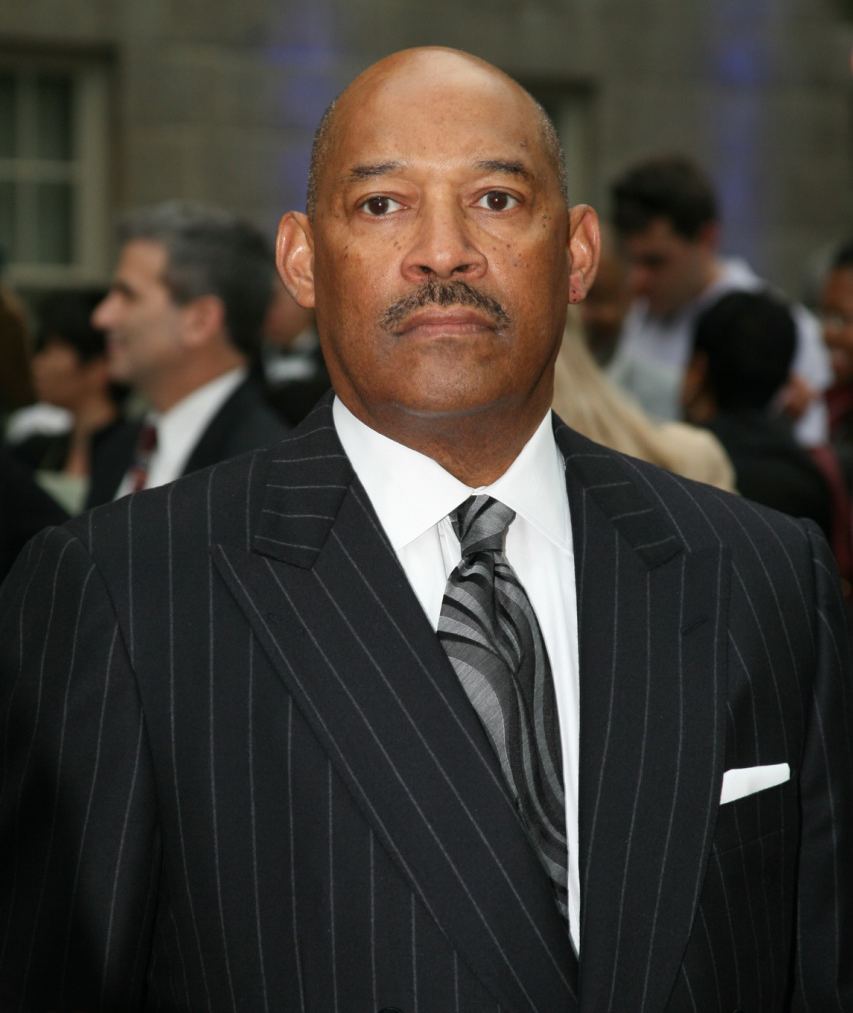
James A. Bell

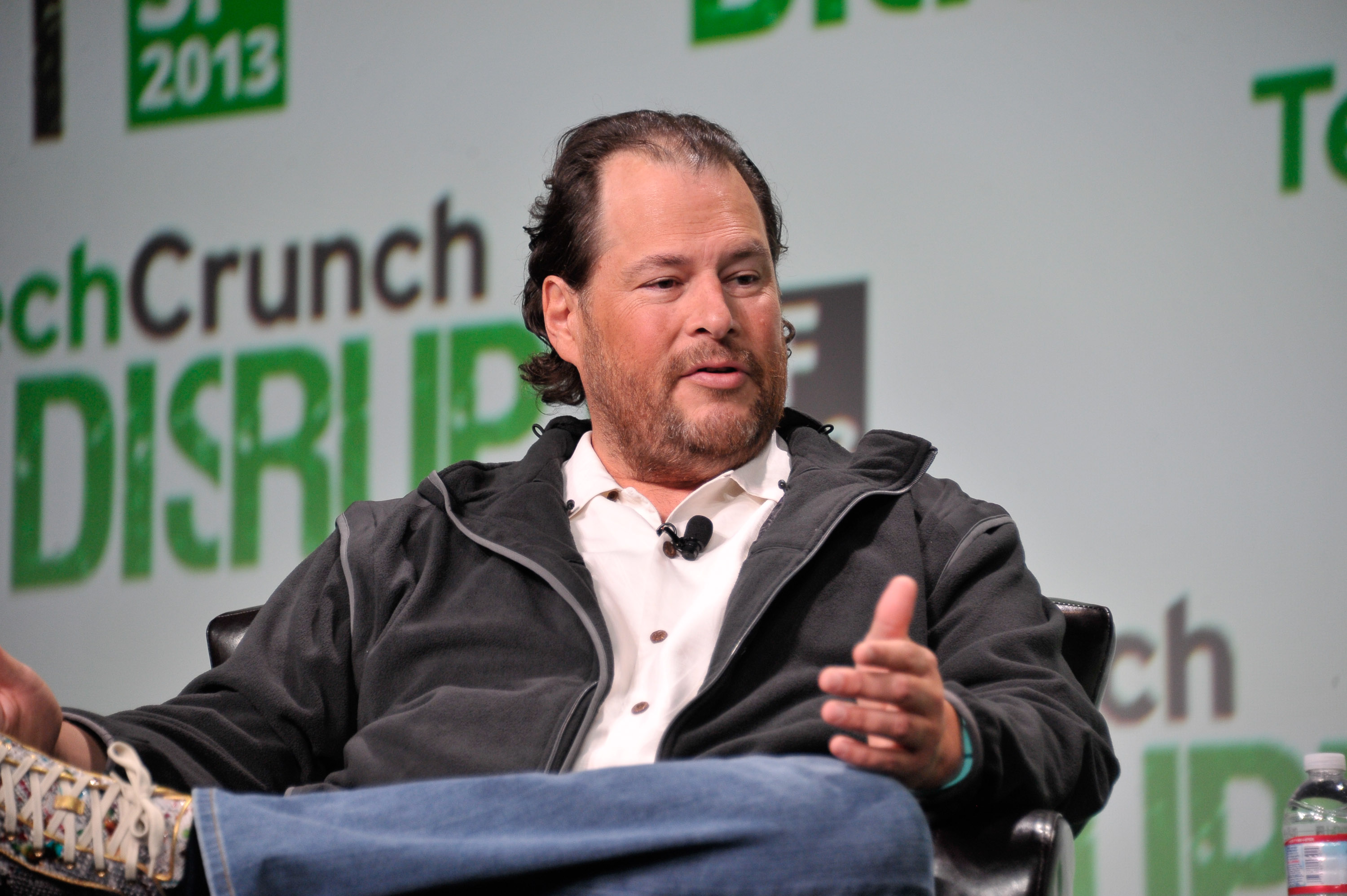
Marc Benioff

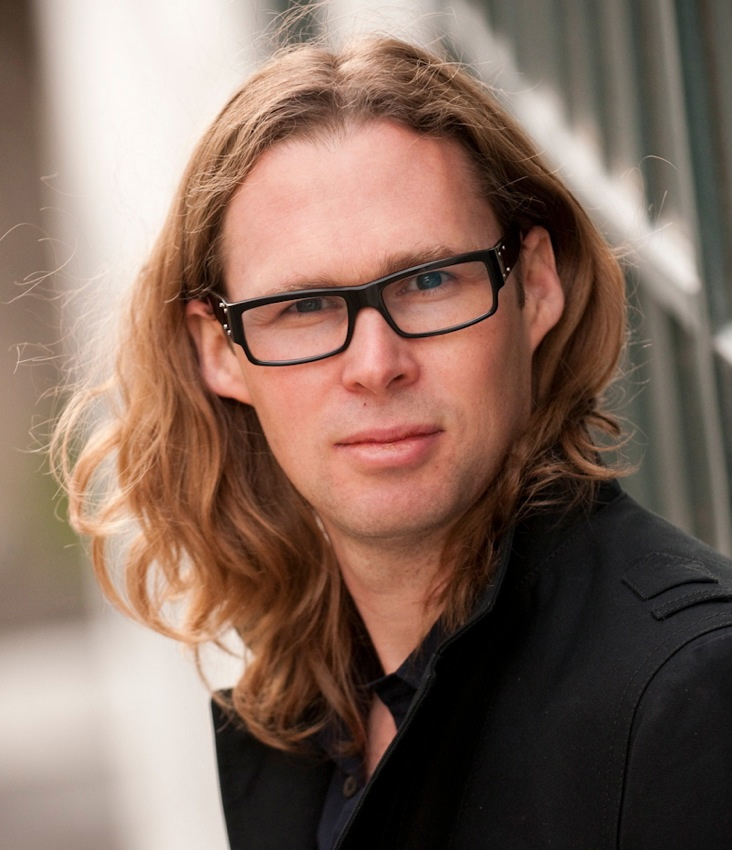
Michael Birch

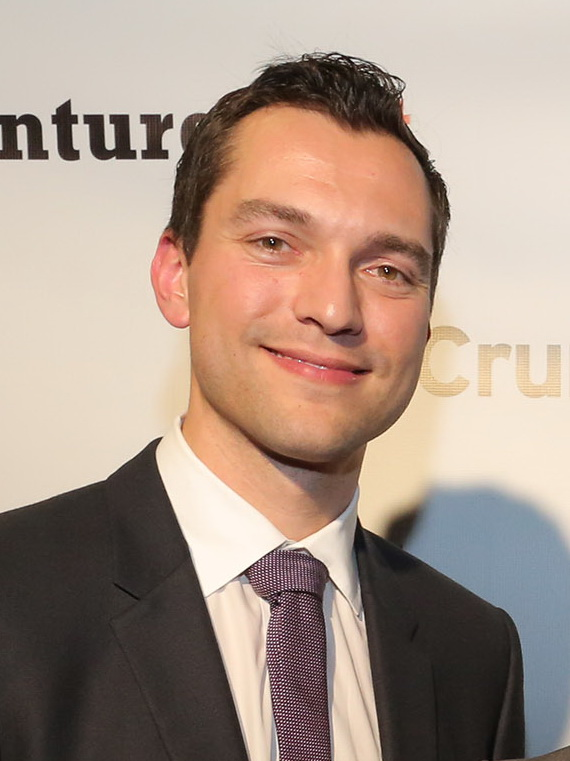
Nathan Blecharczyk

Entertainment, media, and hospitality

- Chris Albrecht, CEO: Starz Inc.
- Bob Arum,* co-founder: Top Rank
- Frank Biondi,* former CEO: Universal Studios
- Louise Blouin,* founder: Louise Blouin Media
- Richard Branson,* founder: Virgin Group
- Scooter Braun
- Peter Chernin,* CEO: The Chernin Group
- Stephen J. Cloobeck, founder: Diamond Resorts International
- W. Don Cornwell,* co-founder: Granite Broadcasting
- Mark Cuban
- Donald Dell,* co-founder: ProServ
- Peter Edge, CEO: RCA Records
- Fred Eychaner,* chairman: Newsweb Corporation
- Rob Friedman, co-chairman: Lionsgate Motion Picture Group
- Larry Flynt, founder: Larry Flynt Publications
- Larry Gagosian, founder: Gagosian Gallery
- David Geffen,* co-founder: DreamWorks
- Peter Georgescu,* former CEO: Young & Rubicam
- Jim Gianopulos, CEO: Fox Entertainment Group
- Daniel Glass, founder: Glassnote Records
- Lisa Henson, CEO: The Jim Henson Company
- Mellody Hobson, chair: DreamWorks Animation
- Alan F. Horn, chair: Walt Disney Studios
- Cathy Hughes, founder: Radio One, TV One
- Bob Iger, CEO: The Walt Disney Company
- Lawrence Jacobs, general counsel: Time Inc.
- Robert L. Johnson,* founder: Black Entertainment Television
- Michelle Jubelirer, COO: Capitol Music Group
- Jeffrey Katzenberg, CEO: DreamWorks Animation
- Sherry Lansing, former CEO: Paramount Pictures
- Debra L. Lee, CEO: BET
- Bryan Lourd, co-chairman: Creative Artists Agency
- Monica C. Lozano,* CEO: ImpreMedia
- Gary Marsh, president: Disney Channels Worldwide
- Robert D. Marcus, CEO: Time Warner Cable
- David Massey, CEO: Island Records
- Chris Meledandri, CEO: Illumination Entertainment
- Ronald Meyer, vice-chairman: NBCUniversal
- James Murren,* CEO: MGM Resorts International (Republican)
- Marc Nathanson, founder: Falcon Cable TV
- Diane W. Nelson, president DC Comics, Warner Bros. Interactive Entertainment
- David Nevins,* president: SHOWTIME
- Mark Pincus,* co-founder: Zynga
- Robert Roche,* founder: Roche Enterprises
- Maria Rodale, CEO: Rodale, Inc.
- Thomas Rothman, chair: Sony Pictures Entertainment Motion Picture Group
- Clara Shih,* co-founder: Hearsay Social
- Russell Simmons, co-founder: Def Jam Recordings
- Stacey Snider, co-chairman: 20th Century Fox
- Roy Spence, co-founder: GSD&M
- Silda Wall Spitzer, co-founder: New York States of Mind LLC
- Srinija Srinivasan,* co-founder: Loove
- Martha Stewart,* (Note: Emmy Award winner) founder: Martha Stewart Living Omnimedia
- John Sykes, co-founder: MTV and VH1
- Arn Tellem, vice-chair: Palace Sports & Entertainment
- Jonathan Tisch, CEO: Loews Hotels
- Thomas Tull, CEO: Legendary Entertainment
- Ted Turner,* founder: CNN, TBS
- Casey Wasserman, chair: Wasserman Media Group
- Harvey Weinstein, co-founder: Miramax Films
- Whurley, co-founder: Chaotic Moon Studios
- Cyma Zarghami, president: Nickelodeon

Finance and banking

- Adrienne Arsht, chair emerita: TotalBank
- Lloyd Blankfein,* CEO: Goldman Sachs
- Stine Bosse, board chair: BankNordik
- Warren Buffett, CEO: Berkshire Hathaway
- Wes Edens, co-founder: Fortress Investment Group
- Blair Effron, co-founder: Centerview Partners
- Lynn Forester de Rothschild, CEO: E.L. Rothschild
- Mina Gerowin*
- Russell Goldsmith, CEO: City National Bank
- Leo Hindery,* managing partner: InterMedia Partners
- Frank F. Islam, founder: QSS Group
- Hamilton E. James, president: The Blackstone Group
- Andrea Jung,* CEO: Grameen America
- George Kaiser, chairman: BOK Financial Corporation
- Vinod Khosla,*founder: Khosla Ventures
- Seth Klarman,* founder: Baupost Group
- Orin Kramer, founder: Boston Provident
- Joshua Kushner,* founder: Thrive Capital
- Marc Lasry, co-founder: Avenue Capital Group
- Jonathan Lavine CIO: Sankaty Advisors
- Thomas H. Lee, founder: Thomas H. Lee Partners
- Howard Lutnick, CEO: Cantor Fitzgerald
- John J. Mack, former CEO: Morgan Stanley
- Aviv Nevo, founder: NV Investments
- William Oberndorf, founder: SPO Partners (Republican)
- Alan Patricof, founder: Apax Partners
- Richard C. Perry, founder: Perry Capital LLC
- Tracey Pettengill Turner, founder: MicroPlace
- J. B. Pritzker, co-founder: Pritzker Group
- Steven Rattner, co-founder: Quadrangle Group
- John W. Rogers Jr., founder: Ariel Capital Management
- Haim Saban, CEO: Saban Capital Group
- Herbert Sandler, former co-CEO: Golden West Financial Corporation
- Adam Sender, founder: Exis Capital Management
- David E. Shaw, founder: D. E. Shaw & Co.
- James Simons, founder: Renaissance Technologies
- Harry E. Sloan, CEO: Global Eagle Acquisition (Republican)
- George Soros, chair: Soros Fund Management; Open Society Foundations
- Tom Steyer, hedge fund manager
- Donald Sussman, board chair: Trust Asset Management
- David Tepper,* founder: Appaloosa Management
- Byron Wien
- Fred Wilson,* founder: Union Square Ventures

Food, fashion, and retail

- S. Daniel Abraham, founder: Slim Fast
- Sophia Amoruso,* founder: Nasty Gal
- Timothy Boyle,* CEO: Columbia Sportswear
- Jeffrey Brotman, CEO: Costco
- Jerry Greenfield, co-founder: Ben & Jerry's
- Gary Hirshberg, co-founder: Stonyfield Yogurt
- George H. Hume,* CEO: Basic American Foods
- Leonard Lauder,* chairman emeritus: Estée Lauder Companies
- Lauren Bush,* founder: FEED Projects
- Austin Ligon, co-founder: CarMax
- Natalie Massenet, founder: Net-a-Porter
- Danny Meyer,* CEO: Union Square Hospitality Group
- Kimbal Musk, founder: The Kitchen Cafe
- Loida Nicolas-Lewis, CEO: TLC Beatrice International
- Mark Parker,* CEO: Nike, Inc.
- Kevin Plank,* founder: Under Armour
- Gary Rodkin, former CEO: ConAgra Foods
- Lauren Santo Domingo,* co-founder: Moda Operandi
- Howard Schultz,* CEO: Starbucks
- James Sinegal, co-founder: Costco
- Sukhinder Singh Cassidy, founder: JOYOUS
- Julie Smolyansky, CEO: Lifeway Foods
- Susie Tompkins Buell, co-founder: Esprit

Health and services

- Susan Bayh
- Michael S. Berman, president: the Duberstein Group
- H. Rodgin Cohen, senior chair: Sullivan & Cromwell
- Nazie Eftekhari, founder: HealthEZ
- Mike Fernandez, founder: MBF Healthcare Partners (Republican)
- Dennis Hof
- Jeffrey Krinsk,* co-founder: Finkelstein & Krinsk
- John B. Morgan, founder: Morgan & Morgan
- Tony Podesta, founder: Podesta Group
- Anne Wojcicki, co-founder: 23andMe

Real estate and home-building

- Eli Broad, founder: KB Home, SunAmerica
- Barbara Corcoran
- Douglas Durst,* president: Durst Organization
- Stephen L. Green,* founder: SL Green Realty
- Calvin King, president: AR Land and Farm Development
- David Lichtenstein, CEO: The Lightstone Group
- Hamid R. Moghadam,* CEO: Prologis (Republican)
- Angelo Tsakopoulos
- John Zaccaro, developer

Technology

- Sam Altman,* president: Y Combinator
- Marc Andreessen,* co-founder: Netscape (Republican)
- Peter Barnes,* co-founder: CREDO Mobile
- Carl Bass,* CEO: Autodesk
- Bruce Bastian, founder: WordPerfect
- Marc Benioff,* founder: salesforce.com
- Michael Birch, co-founder: Bebo
- Xochi Birch, co-founder: Bebo
- Nathan Blecharczyk,* co-founder: Airbnb
- Brook Byers
- Ursula Burns, CEO: Xerox
- Steve Case, founder: AOL
- Brian Chesky,* co-founder: Airbnb
- Marcelo Claure,* CEO: Sprint Corporation
- Tim Cook,* CEO: Apple Inc.
- Barry Diller,* chair: Expedia, Inc.
- John Doerr*
- John Donahoe, former CEO: eBay
- Esther Dyson
- Raj Fernando, CEO: Scoutahead.com
- Laetitia Garriott de Cayeux, co-founder: Escape Dynamics
- Richard Garriott, founder: Portalarium
- Joe Gebbia, co-founder: Airbnb
- Charles Geschke, co-founder: Adobe Systems Inc.
- Tim Gill, founder: Quark
- Reed Hastings,* co-founder: Netflix
- Reid Hoffman,* co-founder: LinkedIn
- Elizabeth Holmes, CEO: Theranos
- Lisa Hook,* CEO: Neustar
- Drew Houston,* founder: Dropbox
- Chris Hughes, co-founder: Facebook
- Irwin M. Jacobs,* co-founder: Qualcomm
- Paul E. Jacobs,* chair: Qualcomm
- Randall Kaplan, co-founder: Akamai Technologies
- David Karp,* founder: Tumblr
- Michael Kassan,* founder: MediaLink
- Chris M. Kelly, former CPO: Facebook
- Dara Khosrowshahi,* CEO: Expedia, Inc.
- Omid Kordestani, chair: Twitter
- Robert Kotick, CEO: Activision Blizzard
- Chris Larsen, co-founder: Ripple, Prosper Marketplace, E-Loan
- Corinna E. Lathan, founder: AnthroTronix
- Henry Laufer, former VP of Research: Renaissance Technologies
- Aaron Levie,* co-founder: Box
- Stephen J. Luczo,* CEO: Seagate Technology
- Marissa Mayer,* CEO: Yahoo!
- Dave McClure,* founder: 500 Startups
- Dustin Moskovitz,* co-founder: Facebook
- Nathan Myhrvold,* former CTO: Microsoft; co-founder: Intellectual Ventures
- Craig Newmark, founder: Craigslist
- Stepan Pachikov,* founder: Evernote
- Sean Parker,* former president: Facebook; co-founder: Napster
- Charles E. Phillips,* CEO: Infor
- Shervin Pishevar, co-founder: Hyperloop Technologies
- Kim Polese, chair: ClearStreet
- Vivek Ranadivé, founder: TIBCO Software
- Eric Ries
- Chuck Robbins, CEO: Cisco Systems (Republican)
- Chris Sacca
- Sheryl Sandberg, COO: Facebook
- Eric Schmidt, chair: Alphabet Inc.
- Steve Spinner
- John Sall,* co-founder: SAS Institute
- Jeremy Stoppelman,* CEO: Yelp
- Stuart Trevelyan, CEO: NGP VAN
- Howard A. Tullman
- Tarah Wheeler,* CEO: Fizzmint
- Susan Wojcicki, CEO: YouTube

Transportation, energy, and industry

- Daniel Akerson,* former CEO: General Motors (Republican)
- Richard H. Anderson,* executive chairman: Delta Air Lines
- James A. Bell,* former president and CFO: Boeing
- David W. Crane,* former CEO: NRG Energy
- Kellie Gerardi, media specialist: Commercial Spaceflight Federation
- Jacqueline Hinman,* CEO: CH2M Hill
- Lynn Jurich,* co-founder: Sunrun
- Ellen Kullman,* former CEO: DuPont
- Elon Musk,* co-founder: SpaceX, Tesla Motors
- Marty Nesbitt, founder: The Parking Spot
- Doug Parker,* CEO: American Airlines Group
- Lyndon Rive, CEO: SolarCity
- Padmasree Warrior, CEO: NextEV

=== Scholars, critics, and academic administrators ===
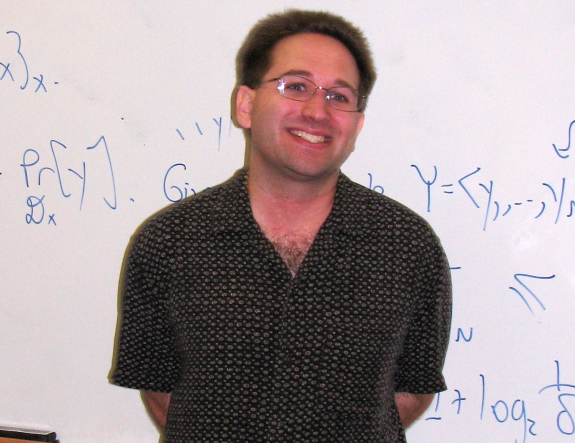
Scott Aaronson

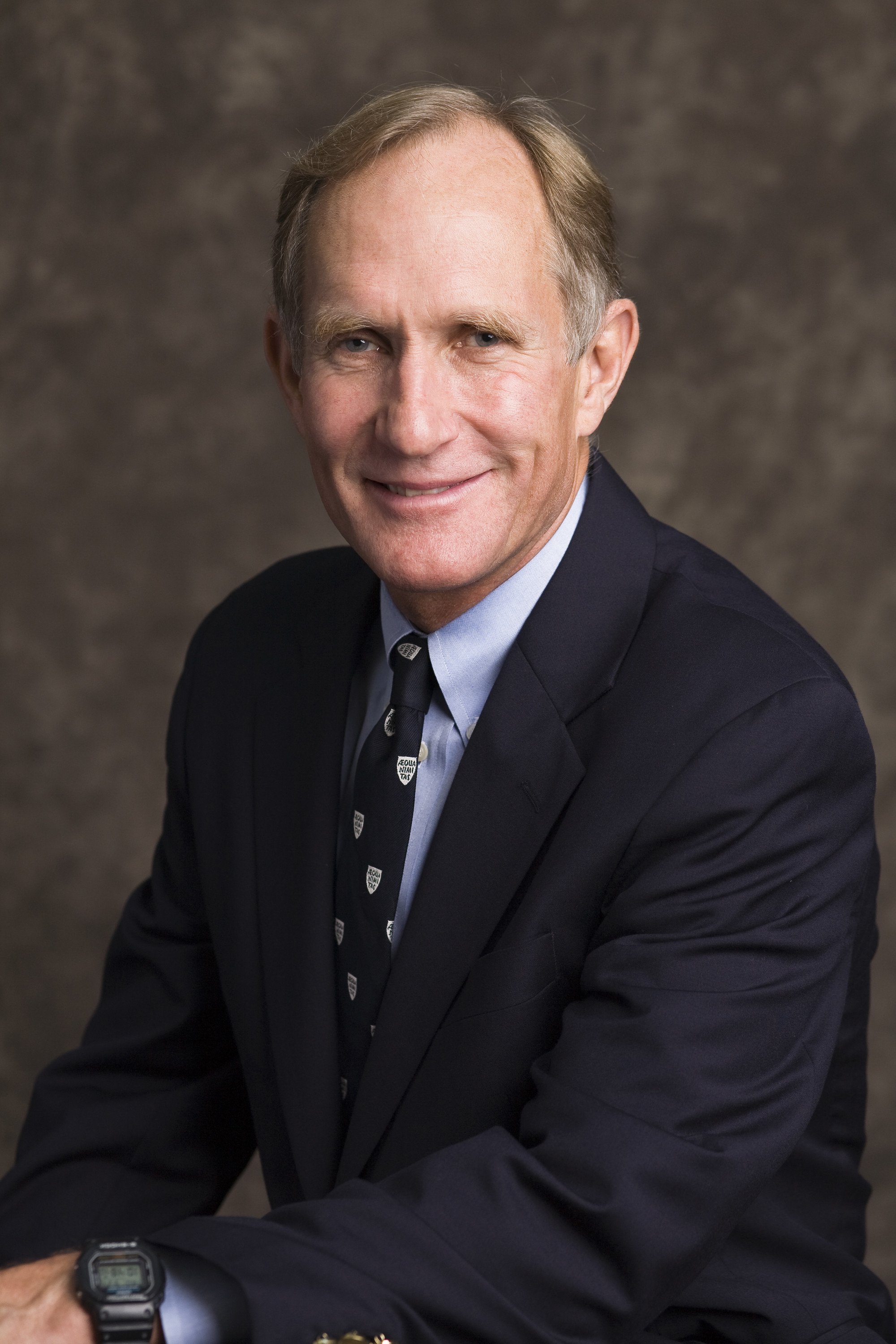
Peter Agre

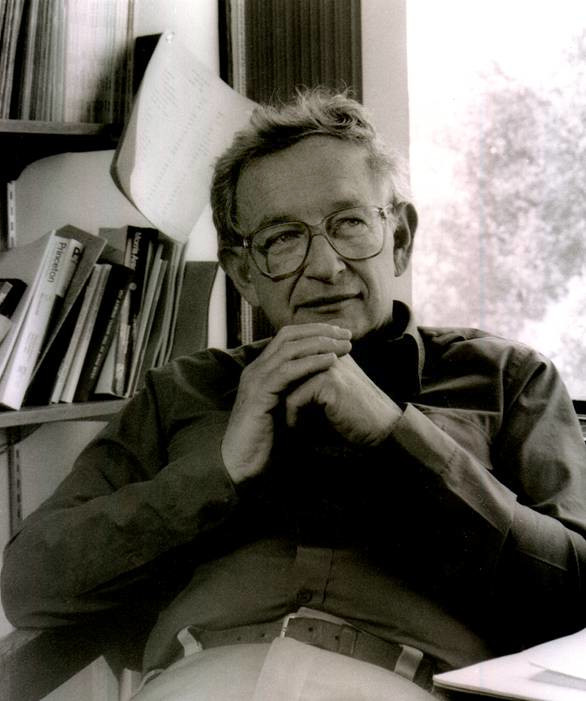
Philip W. Anderson

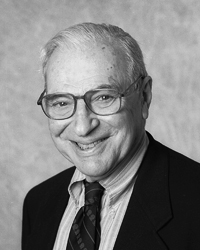
Kenneth Arrow

Computer scientists and mathematicians

- Scott Aaronson
- Bonnie Berger
- Vint Cerf*
- Jeff Moss,* founder: Black Hat Briefings and DEF CON

Deans, regents, and presidents

- Anand Anandalingam, dean: Imperial College Business School
- Roger H. Brown, president: Berklee College of Music
- Calvin O. Butts, president: The State University of New York at Old Westbury
- David L. Cohen, chairman of the board of trustees: University of Pennsylvania
- Glenda Glover, president: Tennessee State University
- Ruth Harkin, regent: Iowa Board of Regents
- Frederick S. Humphries, president emeritus: Tennessee State University, Florida A&M University
- Jane O'Meara Sanders,* president: Burlington College (2004–11)
- Jim Tressel, president: Youngstown State University

Economists

- Kenneth Arrow* (Note: Nobel Prize laureate)
- Barry Bluestone*
- Heather Boushey, chief economist: Washington Center for Equitable Growth
- Angus Deaton*
- Peter Diamond*
- Sebastián Edwards*
- Teresa Ghilarducci
- Herbert Gintis*
- Robert J. Gordon*
- Oliver Hart*
- Derek C. Jones*
- Stephanie Kelton*
- Paul Krugman
- Glenn Loury
- Robert Lucas Jr.*
- Nora Lustig*
- Eric Maskin*
- Daniel McFadden*
- Robert C. Merton*
- Lawrence Mishel,* president: Economic Policy Institute*
- Richard Murnane*
- Roger Myerson*
- Richard Parker*
- Edmund Phelps*
- Michael Reich*
- Dani Rodrik*
- Franklin Delano Roosevelt III*
- Alvin Roth*
- Emmanuel Saez*
- Thomas Sargent*
- Stephanie Seguino*
- William F. Sharpe*
- Robert J. Shapiro
- Robert Shiller*
- Christopher Sims*
- Robert Solow*
- Andrew Zimbalist*

Historians and archaeologists

- Riane Eisler
- Niall Ferguson*
- Allan Lichtman
- Deborah Lipstadt
- Diane Ravitch*
- Jeff Shesol
- Malcolm H. Wiener

Political scientists and scholars of law and public policy

- Mark C. Alexander
- Danielle Allen*
- Chris Blattman
- Rosa Brooks
- Tai-Heng Cheng
- Colleen V. Chien
- Denise Dresser
- Daniel W. Drezner
- Jacob Hacker
- Christopher Jencks*
- Orin Kerr
- Jeffrey L. Kessler*
- Khizr Khan*
- Norm Ornstein
- Paul Pierson
- Harold Pollack
- Robert Pozen
- Adolph L. Reed Jr.*
- Elliott Sclar*
- Neera Tanden, president: Center for American Progress

Scholars and critics of literature, cinema, art, culture, philosophy, and ethics

- Jill Biden*
- Susan Bordo
- Roxane Gay
- Greil Marcus
- Dan-el Padilla Peralta
- Robert A. Rees*
- Salamishah Tillet*

Scholars of international affairs, foreign policy, and regional studies

- Max Boot, senior fellow: Council on Foreign Relations (Republican)
- Reuel Marc Gerecht,* senior fellow: Foundation for Defense of Democracies
- William D. Hartung*
- Robert Kagan, co-founder: Project for the New American Century (Republican)
- Tom Nichols (Republican)
- David Rothkopf
- Omid Safi,* director: Duke Islamic Studies Center
- Michael John Williams
- Thomas Schelling*
- James Zogby,* founder: Arab American Institute

Scholars of the natural sciences and physicians

- Peter Agre*
- Sidney Altman*
- Philip W. Anderson*
- David Baltimore*
- Paul Berg*
- Günter Blobel*
- Michael Stuart Brown*
- Linda Buck*
- Mario Capecchi*
- Martin Chalfie*
- Leon Cooper*
- Johann Deisenhofer*
- Peter C. Doherty*
- Edmond Fischer*
- Jerome I. Friedman*
- Walter Gilbert*
- Sheldon Glashow*
- Joseph L. Goldstein*
- Paul Greengard*
- Carol Greider*
- David Gross*
- Roger Guillemin*
- Leland Hartwell*
- Dudley Herschbach*
- Roald Hoffman*
- H. Robert Horvitz*
- Louis Ignarro*
- Eric Kandel*
- Brian Kobilka*
- Roger Kornberg*
- Leon Lederman*
- Robert Lefkowitz*
- Anthony Leggett*
- Michael Levitt*
- Rudolph Marcus*
- John C. Mather*
- Craig Mello*
- William Moerner*
- Mario Molina*
- Ferid Murad*
- Arno Penzias*
- Stanely Prusiner*
- Pardis Sabeti
- Randy Schekman*
- Richard Schrock*
- Hamilton O. Smith*
- Thomas Steitz*
- Fraser Stoddart*
- Thomas Südhof*
- Leonard Susskind,* director: Stanford Institute for Theoretical Physics
- Jack Szostak*
- Joseph Hooton Taylor Jr.*
- Daniel Tsui*
- Harold Varmus*
- James Watson*
- Steven Weinberg*
- Eric Wieschaus*
- Torsten Wiesel*
- Robert Woodrow Wilson*
- David Wineland*

Sociologists, psychologists, and anthropologists

- Tony Campolo
- Manuel Castells*
- Suzanna Danuta Walters
- Michael Eric Dyson
- Daniel Kahneman*
- Rosabeth Moss Kanter
- Kathy Reichs
- Theda Skocpol
- William Julius Wilson*

=== Writers, artists, filmmakers, and producers ===
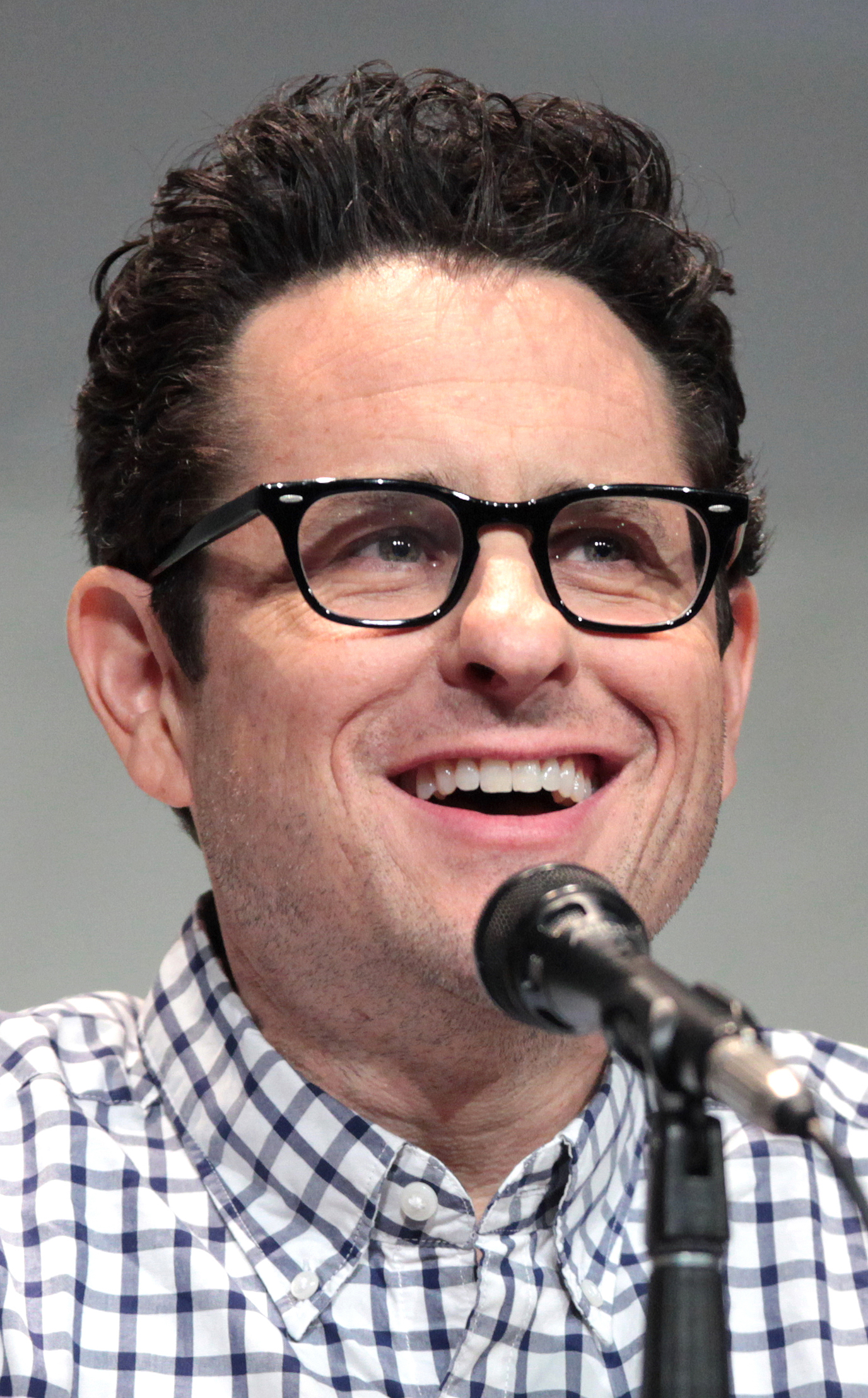
J. J. Abrams

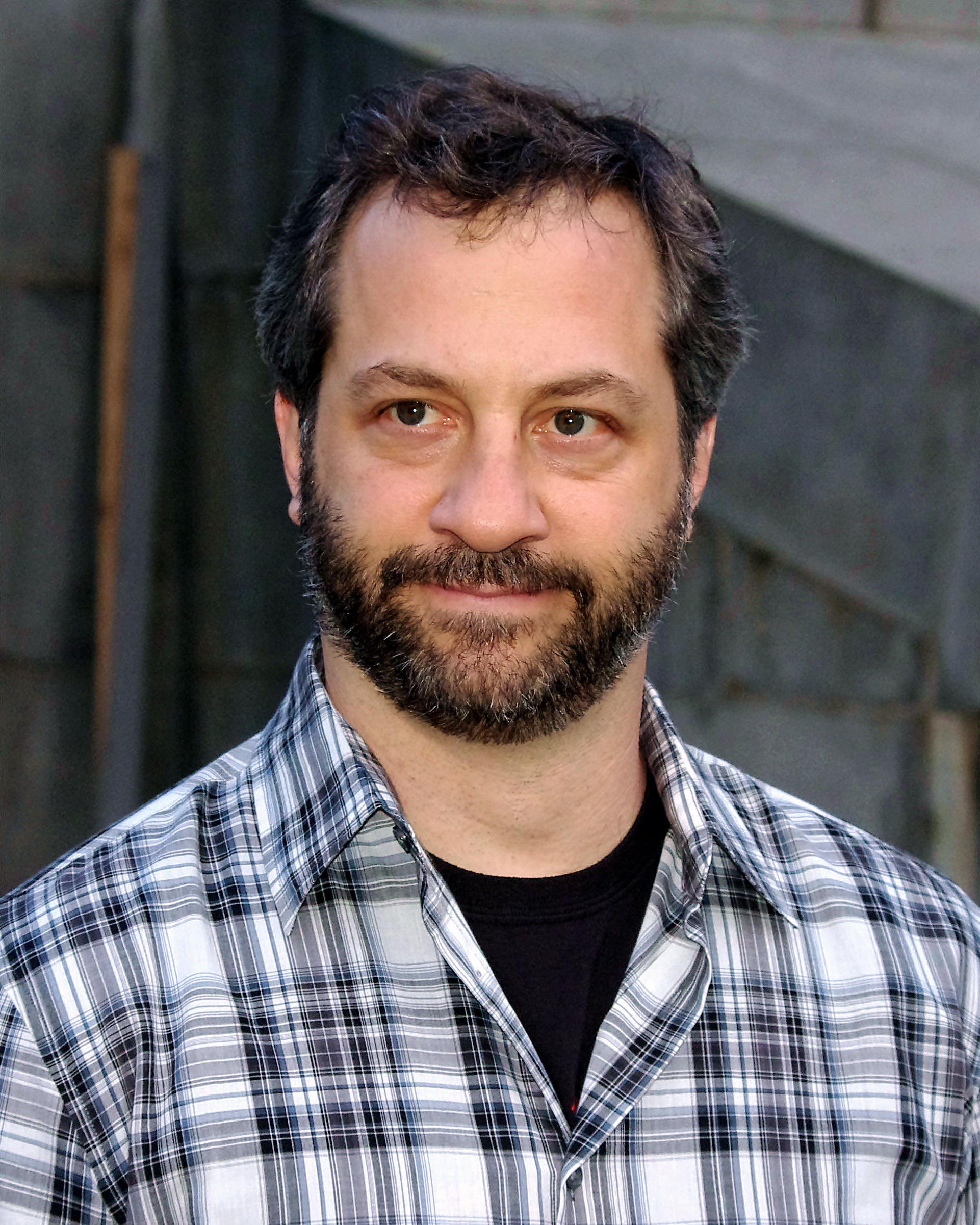
Judd Apatow

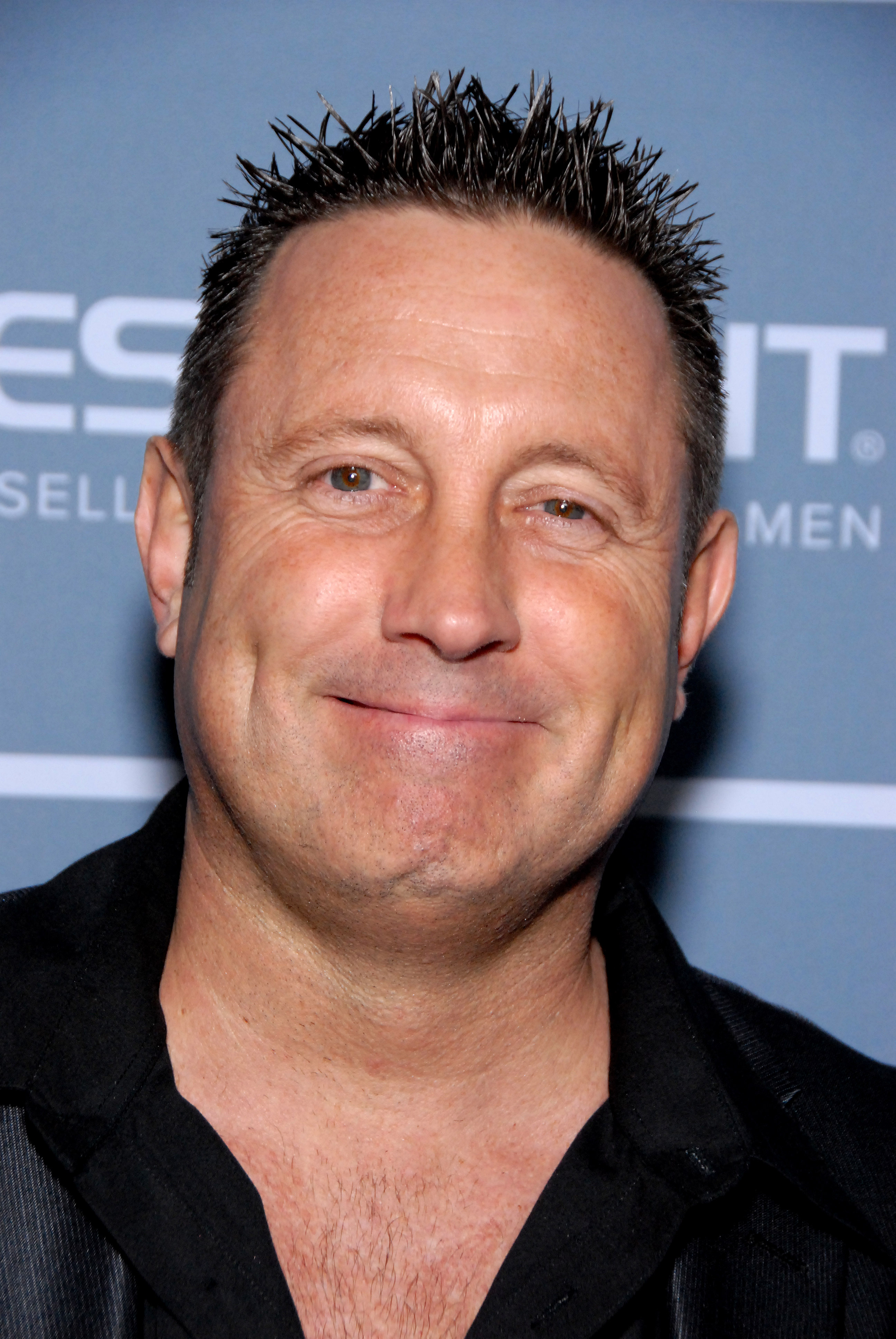
Brad Armstrong

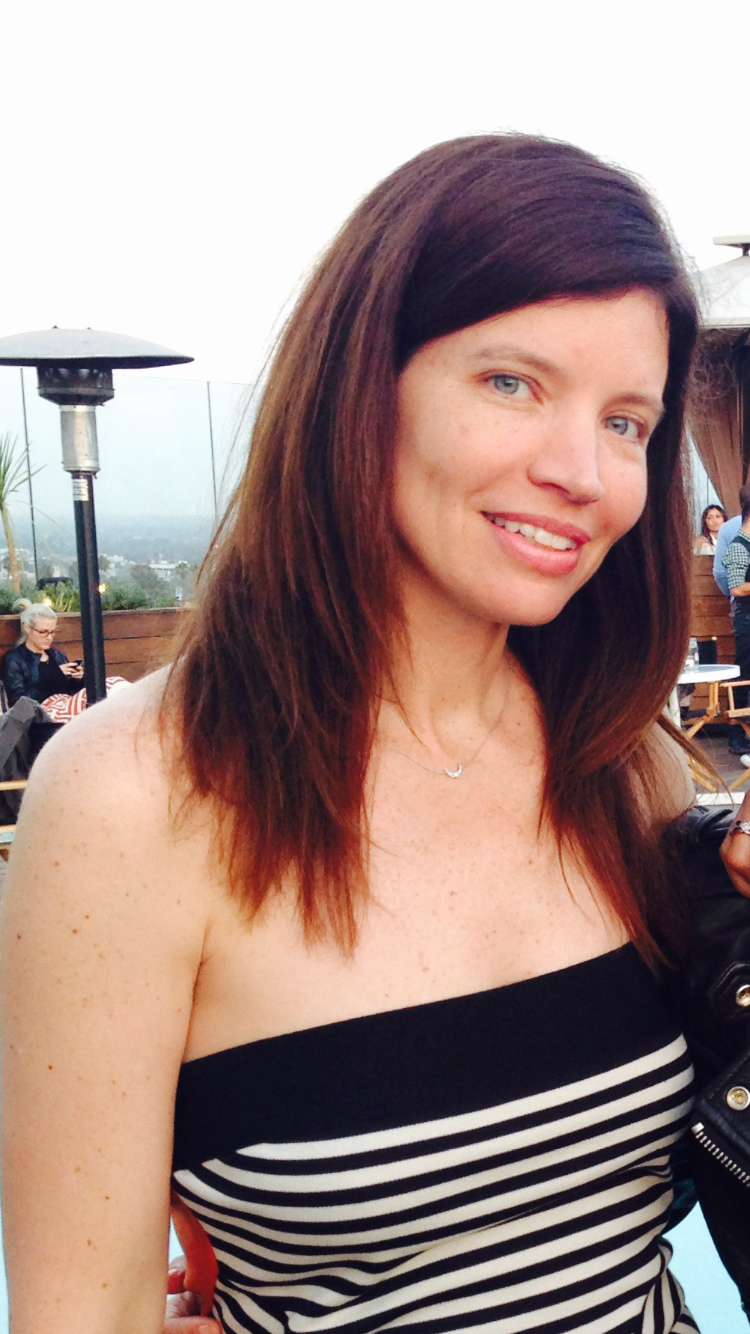
Jamie Babbit

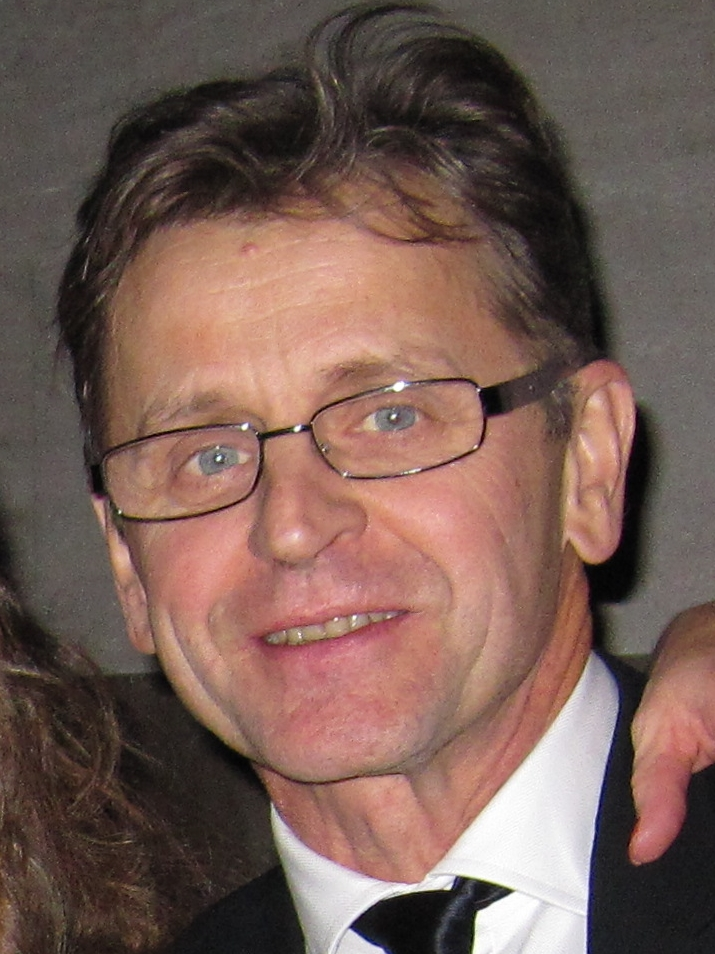
Mikhail Baryshnikov

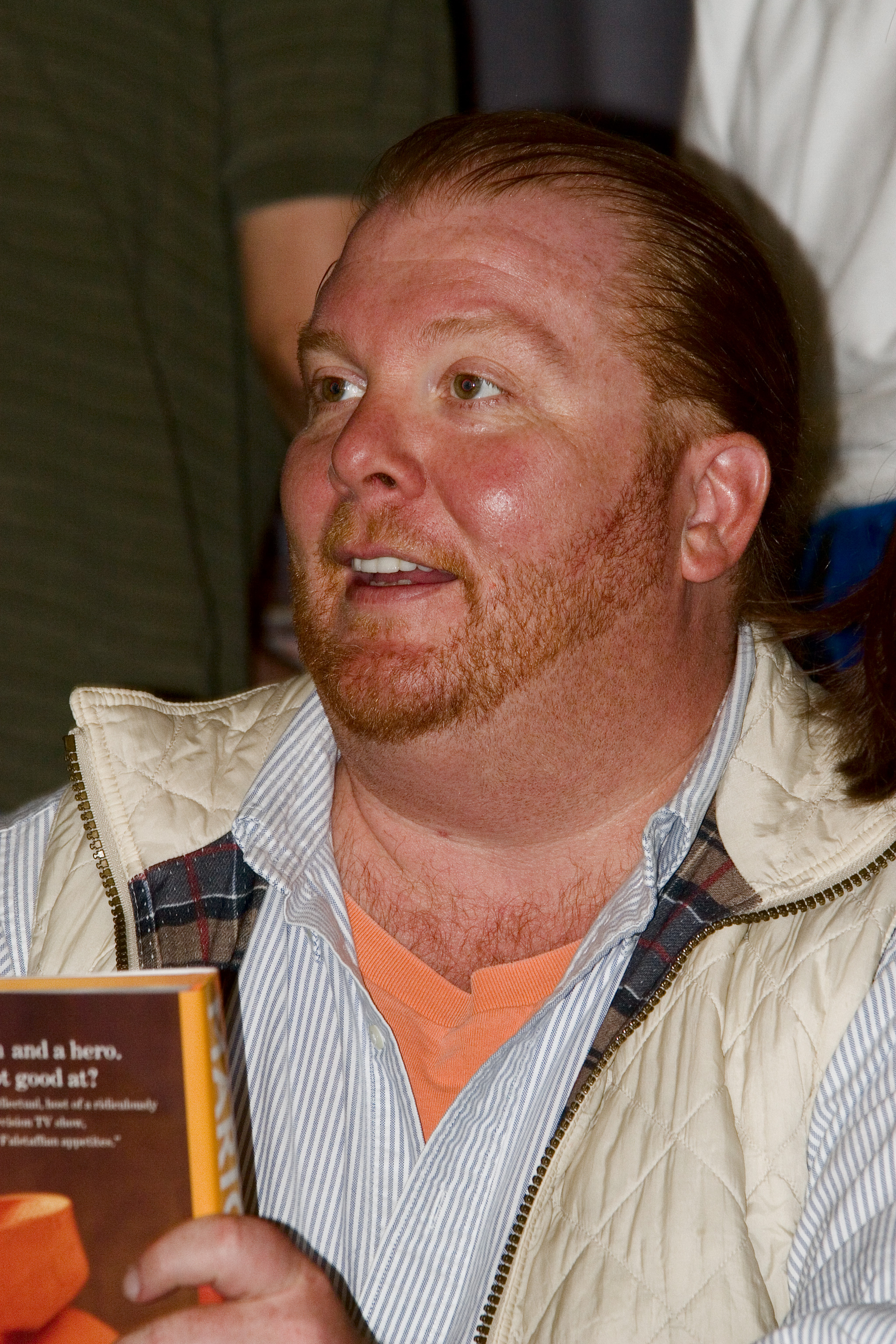
Mario Batali

Animators and creators of comic books, video games, puzzles, and visual effects

- Frank Miller
- Randall Munroe*
- Dave Pressler
- David Tischman

Architects and interior designers

- Frank Gehry
- Michael S. Smith

Chefs

- Dominique Ansel*
- Mario Batali*
- Carla Hall
- James Kent*
- Katie Lee*
- Sandra Lee
- Tony Maws*
- Marcus Samuelsson
- Ming Tsai

Composers

- Chloe Flower*
- Andrew Lippa*
- Stephen Schwartz* (Note: Grammy Award winner) (Note: Academy Award winner)
- Jeanine Tesori* (Note: Tony Award winner)

Dancers

- Mikhail Baryshnikov*

Directors and filmmakers

- J. J. Abrams
- Pedro Almodóvar*
- Judd Apatow
- Gregg Araki*
- Brad Armstrong
- Jamie Babbit
- James Cameron
- Lee Daniels
- Chris Columbus*
- Ryan J. Davis
- Abigail Disney
- Paul Feig
- William Friedkin
- Arne Glimcher
- Ron Howard
- Rory Kennedy
- Phil Lord*
- David Lowery*
- Michael Mayer*
- Christopher Miller*
- Michael Moore*
- Andrea Blaugrund Nevins*
- Bryn Mooser
- Diane Paulus*
- Tyler Perry*
- Brett Ratner
- Dee Rees*
- Rob Reiner
- Robert Rodriguez
- Paul Schrader*
- Adam Shankman
- Jennifer Siebel Newsom
- Steven Spielberg
- Tate Taylor
- John Waters
- Marc Webb
- Joss Whedon*
- Harvey Weinstein

Fashion, costume, and jewelry designers and stylists

- Joseph Altuzarra
- Rachel Antonoff*
- Tory Burch
- Georgina Chapman
- Kenneth Cole
- Keren Craig
- Diane von Fürstenberg
- Prabal Gurung
- Marc Jacobs
- Donna Karan
- Calvin Klein
- Michael Kors
- Karl Lagerfeld
- Ralph Lauren*
- Pamela Love
- Jennifer Meyer
- Kimberly Ovitz
- Monique Péan
- Cynthia Rowley
- Lorraine Schwartz
- Elie Tahari*
- Vera Wang
- Jason Wu
- Rachel Zoe

Film, television, and theater producers

- Neal Baer*
- Lawrence Bender
- Gail Berman
- Steven Bochco
- Marcy Carsey
- Bruce Cohen
- Michael J. Fuchs
- Ellen Goldsmith-Vein
- Howard Gordon
- Marta Kauffman*
- David Kohan*
- Jon Landau*
- Norman Lear
- Avi Lerner
- Chuck Lorre
- George Lucas
- Karen Mack
- Lori McCreary
- Max Mutchnick*
- Shadi Petosky*
- Bill Pohlad*
- Sybil Robson Orr*
- Jane Rosenthal
- Philip Rosenthal
- Barney Rosenzweig
- Bill Stetson
- Steve Tisch*
- Jon F. Vein
- Christina Weiss Lurie
- Harvey Weinstein
- Amy Ziering

Novelists, non-fiction writers, and poets

- Steve Almond*
- Kevin Baker*
- T.C. Boyle*
- John Grisham
- John Hodgman
- Vicki Iovine
- Erica Jong
- Susan Juby*
- Stephen King
- Jay Kristoff*
- Marie Lu*
- George R. R. Martin
- Morgan Matson*
- Megan McCafferty
- Julie Murphy*
- Eileen Myles
- Shari Olefson
- Neal Pollack*
- Katha Pollitt
- Rainbow Rowell*
- John Scalzi*
- Gail Sheehy
- Jim Sleeper*
- Rebecca Solnit*
- David O. Stewart
- Sabaa Tahir*

Painters, sculptors, visual artists, graphic designers, photographers, and performance artists

- Gail Anderson*
- Michael Bierut
- Steve Brodner*
- Carol Brown Goldberg
- Chuck Close*
- Shepard Fairey*
- Louise Fili*
- Tobias Frere-Jones*
- Deborah Kass*
- Jeff Koons*
- Barbara Kruger*
- Annie Leibovitz
- Nora Ligorano*
- Robert Longo*
- Debbie Millman*
- Sassona Norton
- Ryan and Trevor Oakes*
- Olek*
- Laura Parnes*
- Marshall Reese*
- Paula Scher*
- Peter de Seve*
- Cindy Sherman*
- Bonnie Siegler*
- Sarah Sze*

Record producers

- Clarence Avant
- Irving Azoff
- David Foster
- Berry Gordy
- L.A. Reid

Writers for the screen and stage

- Van Badham*
- Amy Berg
- André Bormanis*
- Kate Capshaw
- Karey Dornetto
- Doug Ellin
- Katherine Fugate
- Dan Gilroy
- John Guare*
- Steve Hely
- Felicia D. Henderson
- Winnie Holzman
- David Henry Hwang*
- Al Jean*
- Tony Kushner
- Damon Lindelof
- Ryan Murphy
- George Nolfi
- Seth Rudetsky*
- Amy Sherman-Palladino
- Bonnie Turner
- Matt Warburton

== Organizations ==
=== Business groups and private enterprises ===
- Alice + Olivia*
- Cards Against Humanity*
- Grindr*
- i.am+*
- Milly*
- Moonlite BunnyRanch
- Moschino*
- Nasty Gal*
- National Gay & Lesbian Chamber of Commerce*
- Paul, Weiss, Rifkind, Wharton & Garrison, law firm
- Supreme*
- Team Love Records*
- Union Square Ventures*
- U.S. Hispanic Chamber of Commerce
- U.S. Women's Chamber of Commerce
- World of Wonder

=== Labor unions ===
- AEA – Actors' Equity Association,* representing 44k
- AFA – Association of Flight Attendants,* representing 42k
- AFM – American Federation of Musicians,* representing 90k
- AFGE – American Federation of Government Employees, representing 302k
- AFL-CIO – American Federation of Labor and Congress of Industrial Organizations,* representing 12.7m
- AFSCME – American Federation of State, County and Municipal Employees, representing 1.3m
- AFT – American Federation of Teachers, representing 1.6m
- AWIU – International Association of Heat and Frost Insulators and Allied Workers, representing 30k
- BAC – International Union of Bricklayers and Allied Craftworkers, representing 76k
- BCTGM – Bakery, Confectionery, Tobacco Workers and Grain Millers' International Union,* representing 74k
- CWA – Communications Workers of America,* representing 475k
- GMPIU – Glass, Molders, Pottery, Plastics and Allied Workers International Union,* representing 28k
- IAM – International Association of Machinists and Aerospace Workers, representing 570k
- IATSE – International Alliance of Theatrical Stage Employees, representing 125k
- IBEW – International Brotherhood of Electrical Workers, representing 725k
- IBT – International Brotherhood of Teamsters,* representing 1.3m
- IFPTE – International Federation of Professional and Technical Engineers, representing 80k
- ILA – International Longshoremen's Association, representing 65k
- IUOE – International Union of Operating Engineers, representing 375k
- IUPAT – International Union of Painters and Allied Trades, representing 104k
- IW – International Association of Bridge, Structural, Ornamental and Reinforcing Iron Workers, representing 124k
- LIUNA – Laborers' International Union of North America, representing 558k
- NABTU – North America's Building Trades
- NALC – National Association of Letter Carriers,* representing 277k
- NEA – National Education Association, representing 3m
- NTEU – National Treasury Employees Union, representing 83k
- OPCMIA – Operative Plasterers' and Cement Masons' International Association, representing 39k
- OPEIU – Office and Professional Employees International Union, representing 102k
- PASNAP – Pennsylvania Association of Staff Nurses and Allied Professionals, representing 5k
- SEIU – Service Employees International Union, representing 1.9m
- SIU – Seafarers International Union of North America, representing 35k
- SMART – International Association of Sheet Metal, Air, Rail and Transportation Workers, representing 150k
- TWU – Transport Workers Union of America, representing 116k
- UA – United Association of Journeymen and Apprentices of the Plumbing, Pipefitting and Sprinkler Fitting Industry of the U.S. and Canada, representing 330k
- UAW – United Automobile Workers, representing 990k
- UBC – The United Brotherhood of Carpenters and Joiners of America, representing 520k
- UFCW – United Food and Commercial Workers Union, representing 1.3m
- UFW – United Farm Workers, representing 10k
- UNITE HERE,* representing 264k
- USW – United Steelworkers,* representing 860k
- UURWAW – United Union of Roofers, Waterproofers and Allied Workers, representing 22k
- UWUA – Utility Workers Union of America,* representing 50k

=== Newspapers, magazines, and other media ===
Blogs and other news media

- Daily Kos
- Drowned in Sound
- HollywoodLife.com
- JETMag.com
- Pressparty
- Wonkette

== Retracted endorsements ==
- Farrah Abraham, TV personality
- Scott Adams, cartoonist, endorsed Johnson
- bell hooks, writer and activist
- Morrissey, singer-songwriter
- Douglas Schoen, political analyst and consultant

== See also ==
- List of Democrats who opposed Hillary Clinton presidential campaign, 2016
- List of Hillary Clinton presidential campaign political endorsements, 2016
- List of Bernie Sanders presidential campaign endorsements, 2016
- List of Donald Trump presidential campaign endorsements, 2016
- List of Gary Johnson presidential campaign endorsements, 2016
- List of Hillary Clinton presidential campaign endorsements, 2008
- List of Jill Stein presidential campaign endorsements, 2016
- List of Republicans who opposed Donald Trump presidential campaign, 2016
