= Smolyansky =

Smolyansky is a Slavic surname. Notable people with the surname include:

- Julie Smolyansky (born 1975), American businesswoman
- Michael Smolyansky (1947–2002), American businessman, father of Julie

== See also ==
- David Smolansky
