= Lifeway Foods =

American health food company

Lifeway Foods, Inc.
- Type: Public
- Traded as: Nasdaq: LWAY; Russell Microcap Index component
- Industry: Health food
- Founded: Morton Grove, Illinois (1986)
- Founder: Michael Smolyansky
- Headquarters: Morton Grove, Illinois, United States
- Key people: Julie Smolyansky (CEO); Michael Smolyansky (Founder)
- Products: Kefir
- Revenue: ▲US$186.8 million (2024)
- Operating income: ▼US$13.852 million (2024)
- Net income: ▼US$9.025 million (2024)
- Total assets: ▲US$90.5 million (2024)
- Total equity: ▲US$71.9 million (2024)
- Website: lifewaykefir.com
- Footnotes; Financials as of March 14, 2025.

Lifeway Foods is an Illinois-based health food company founded in 1986. They are a leading U.S. supplier of kefir and fermented probiotic products to support the microbiome.

== History ==
Lifeway Foods was founded by Michael Smolyansky, a Ukrainian Jewish immigrant who arrived in the United States from Kyiv, Ukraine, USSR, in 1976. During a trip to West Germany, Michael and his wife, Ludmila Smolyansky, realized the kefir sold at a tradeshow was not sold in the United States and decided to start producing it.

The company went public and debuted on the NASDAQ exchange in 1988. They opened their first plant in Skokie, Illinois, a year later. The company began to grow by expanding its product lines and increasing its distribution.

After Michael's death in 2002, his daughter, Julie Smolyansky, took over and became the youngest female CEO of a publicly held firm at the age of 27. Since that time, Julie has grown Lifeway’s annual revenues from $12 million in 2002, to over $119 million in 2021. Now, Lifeway estimates it occupies 95 percent of the U.S. market in kefir, which the company has helped turn from a niche health-food product to a formidable player in the surging global market for yogurt and other cultured-milk products.

== Products ==
Lifeway's flagship product is kefir. Lifeway sells it in several varieties, including low-fat, non-fat, Greek, organic, and low-carb varieties, as well as these in several different flavors. The company also produces farmer cheese resembling Eastern-European style tvorog and Lifeway Oat, a probiotic oat milk designed to support the gut.

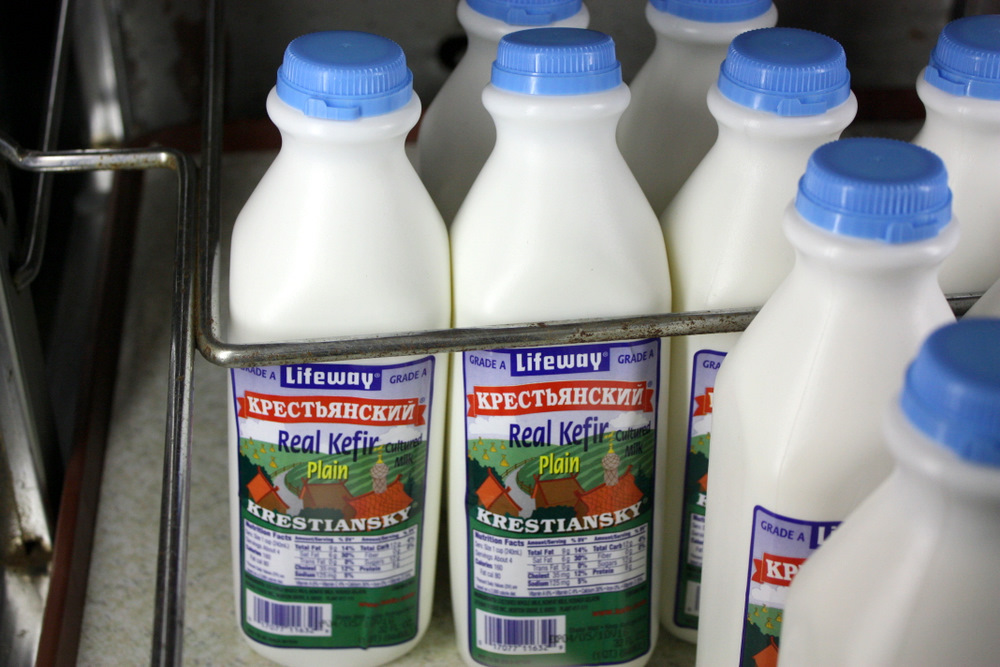
Krestiansky kefir

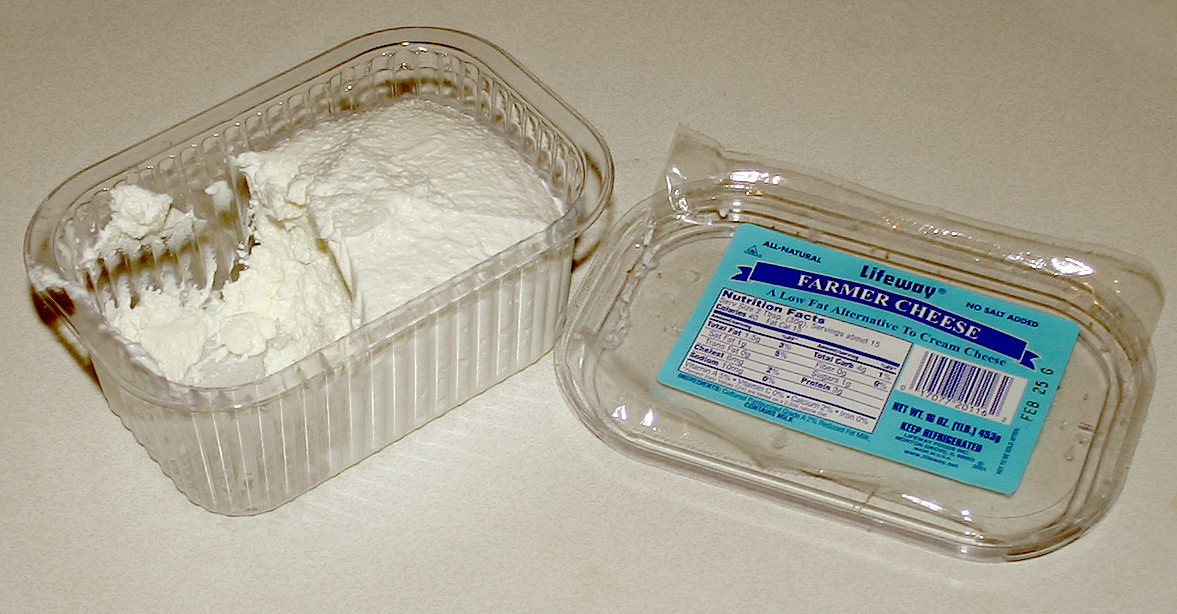
Farmer cheese
