= Duke Islamic Studies Center =

The Duke Islamic Studies Center, also known as DISC, is "a vibrant, diverse community of scholars and students engaged in interdisciplinary teaching, interactive learning, and cutting-edge research about Islam and Muslims" at Duke University. DISC describes itself as taking "a comparative, cross cultural approach to Islamic studies to encourage creative solutions to the economic, political and social challenges involving Muslims."

Established in 2006 and replacing the Center for the Study of Muslim Networks (CSMN), the Duke Islamic Studies Center (DISC) aims to "advance knowledge and research about the world of Islam."

== Faculty Leadership ==
Mbaye Lo serves as the director of DISC (2025–present). The center was previously led by Adam Mestyan from 2024 - 2025, by Eve Duffy from 2022 - 2024, by Ellen McLarney from 2019 - 2022, by Omid Safi from 2014 - 2019, by Gilbert Merkx from 2011 - 2014, and by Bruce Lawrence from 2006 - 2011.

Prominent past faculty leadership includes Abdullah Antepli, who served as Chief Representative for Muslim Affairs from 2014 - 2019 and as the Associate Director of DISC from 2014 - 2015.

Core DISC faculty includes:

- Amal Boumaaza
- Andrew Griebeler
- Ellen McLarney
- Engseng Ho
- Erdağ Göknar
- Fadi Bardawil
- Jen'nan Read
- Maha Houssami
- Mbaye Lo
- Mohsen Kadivar
- Mona Hassan
- Mustafa Tuna
- Negar Mottahedeh
- Omid Safi
- Timur Kuran

Faculty fellows includes:

- Jennifer Knust
- Badr Abdelfatta
- Sarah Baker
- Mark Dalhouse

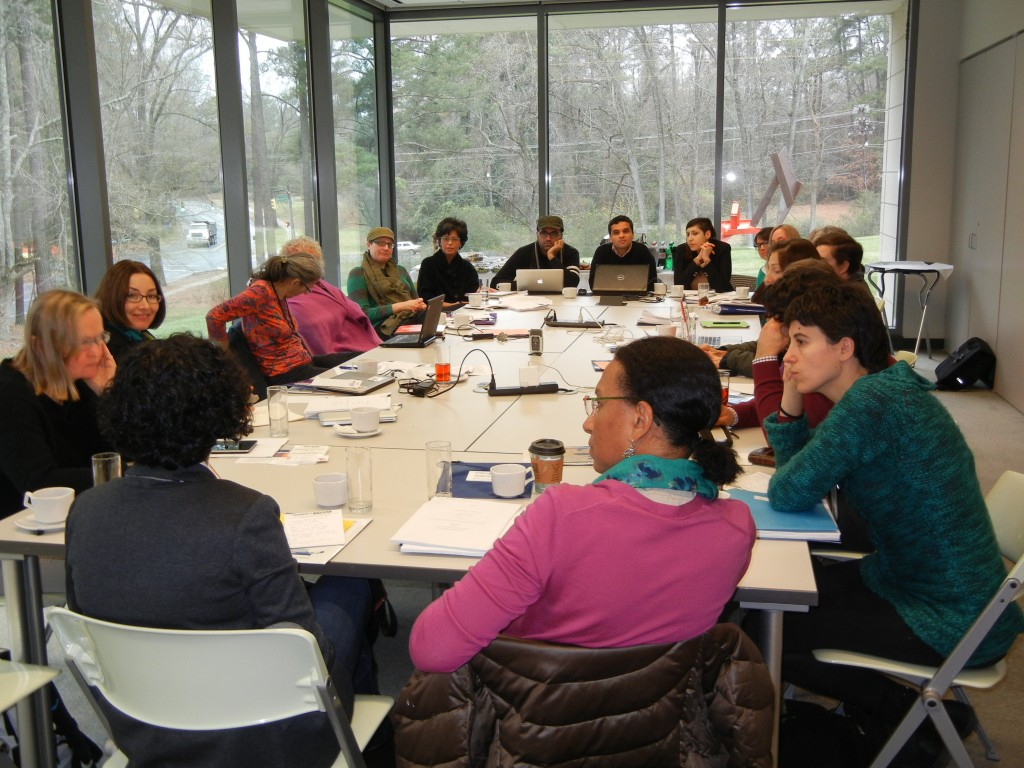
Geographies of Gender in the Arab Revolutions Conference

== Projects and Initiatives ==
In addition to running various events and academic programs, DISC sponsors special initiatives that are related to Islam.

Transcultural Islam Project

The Transcultural Islam Project was a multi-year project launched in July 2011 with funding support from the Carnegie Corporation. This initiative had two overarching goals: 1) to inform public discourse and policy by publicizing and promoting scholarly and research-based information about Islam and Muslims; 2) to support scholarship and scholarly collaborations to advance research about Islam and Muslims across the globe.

DISC Media Fellows Initiative

The Disc Media Fellows Initiative was established in order to promote the interaction of Islam covering journalists and Muslims with the student base of Duke University, as well as with Dewitt Wallace Media Followers.

ISLAMiCommentary

ISLAMiCommentary was a website which aimed to inform the general public about "the diversity of thought and cultures within Islam and Muslim communities," present both abroad and in the United States. New media production ended on June 30, 2016.

Project Funding

These initiatives were funded by the Social Science Research Council.

- ISLAMiCommentary
- TIRNScholars: Transcultural Islam Research Network
- Duke-RTI Professors & Practitioners Series
- British Council Our Shared Future
- Durham Library- Muslim Bookshelves
- DISC-Oxford Centre for Islamic Studies (OCIS) Partnership
- DISC Media Fellows

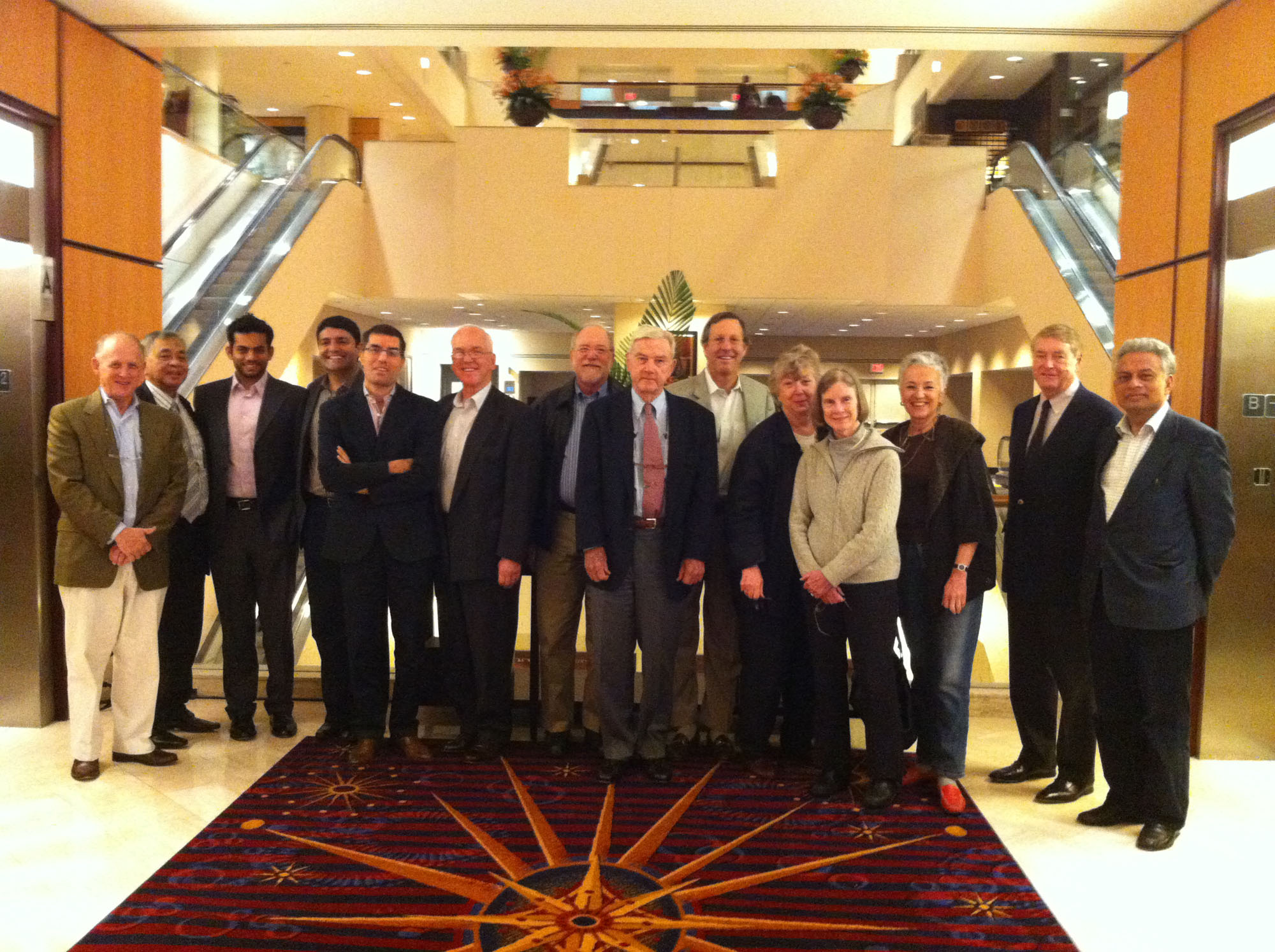
DISC Board in DC

== DISC Advisory Board ==
- D. Randall Benn
- Ken Close
- Eugene V. Fife
- Seham Al Foraih
- James P. Gorter
- Nauman Khan
- Bruce B. Lawrence
- Bettye Musham
- Charles Ogburn, Co-chair
- Kimberly Reed
- Hooman Sabeti-Rahmati, Co-chair
- Ayşe Soysal
- Marzuki Usman
- Dato Wan Ariff Wan Hamzah
- Hasnain Zaidi
