= Omid Safi =

American academic

Academic background
- Education: Duke University

Academic work
- Main interests: Sufism, contemporary Islam, liberationist spirituality
- Website: omidsafi.com

Omid Safi is an Iranian-American professor of Asian and Middle Eastern Studies at Duke University. He was the Director of Duke Islamic Studies Center from July 2014 to June 2019 and was a columnist for On Being. Safi specializes in Islamic mysticism (Sufism), contemporary Islamic thought and medieval Islamic history. Before joining Duke University, Safi was a professor at the University of North Carolina Chapel Hill. Prior to joining the University of North Carolina at Chapel Hill, he was on faculty at Colgate University as an assistant professor of Philosophy and Religion from 1999 to 2004.

== Life and work ==
Omid Safi was born in Jacksonville, Florida, and is of Iranian descent. He was raised in Iran and migrated from Tehran to the United States with his family in 1985.

Safi is a leader of the progressive Muslim movement, which he defines as encompassing:

a number of themes: striving to realize a just and pluralistic society through a critical engagement with Islam, a relentless pursuit of social justice, an emphasis on gender equality as a foundation of human rights, and a vision of religious and ethnic pluralism.

After September 11, 2001, Safi was publicly critical of the intolerance and violence among Muslims that inspired the attacks, reminding Muslims that their role lay in "calling both Muslims and Americans to the highest good of which we are capable."

Safi's book Progressive Muslims (2003) contains a diverse collection of essays by and about progressive Muslims. He is one of a number of progressive scholars of Islam in the early 21st century whose work has described for Western readers the diverse range of Muslim thought in the last half of the 20th century. As such, he has been described by Kevin Eckstrom, editor-in-chief of the Religion News Service, as "on the front edge of a generation of scholars who, with one foot in both worlds, are trying to explain Islam and the West to each other."

Safi's more recent works deal with the themes of Islamic spirituality. These include the volume Memories of Muhammad: Why the Prophet Matters. His more recent work in this area is Radical Love: Teachings from the Islamic Mystical Tradition, which was published by Yale University Press in 2018. Radical Love refers to the teachings of the Path of 'Eshq (Arabic: 'Ishq), a distinct path of Islamic spirituality in which Divine and human love mingle.

== Books ==
- Progressive Muslims: On Justice, Gender, and Pluralism. Edited by Omid Safi (Oxford: Oneworld, 2003)
- The Politics of Knowledge in Premodern Islam. (Chapel Hill: UNC Press, 2006)
- Voices of Change (Vol. 5 in the series Voices of Islam), edited by Omid Safi (Praeger, 2006)
- Memories of Muhammad: Why the Prophet Matters. (HarperOne, 2009)
- Voices of American Muslims. (New York: Hippocrene Books, Inc., 2005) By Linda Brandi Caetura with introductory essay and interview with Omid Safi
- Radical Love: Teachings from the Islamic Mystical Tradition. (Yale Univ. Press, 2018)
