= Ryan and Trevor Oakes =

American artists and draftsmen

Ryan and Trevor Oakes (born 1982)(also referred to as the Oakes Brothers or Oakes Twins) are identical twin American artists and draftsmen best known for collaborative large scale drawings using a concave gridded easel. They create camera obscura exact drawings using an easel which they devised and built. Their drawings, paintings, and sculptures explore the intersection of art and mathematics.

== Early life and education ==
Born in 1982 to social worker Larry Oakes and academic Elizabeth Poe. They attended art school at Cooper Union.

== Work ==
Using their self-designed easel they render a scene on a curved sheet of paper by tracing what is in front of them onto that page freehand, as if using a camera obscura or a camera lucida projection, only they use no equipment only their own binocular vision or more precisely their visual cortex, which allows them to trace a "ghost" image that appears before them.

Their drawings are often site specific and are often completed in public spaces where the artists engage with onlookers and answer questions about their unique technique. Locations include The Getty Center in Los Angeles and Cloud Gate in Chicago.

== Exhibitions ==
Compounding Visions: The Art of Ryan and Trevor Oakes. National Museum of Mathematics. May 2014.
