= Michael Smolyansky =

American businessman

Michael Smolyansky (May 4, 1947 – June 9, 2002) was an ex-Soviet Union businessman. He was the chairman, president and CEO of Lifeway Foods, Inc., a dairy company based in Morton Grove, Illinois. He founded the company in 1986.

== Family ==
Michael Smolyansky was Ukrainian Jewish, originally from Kyiv, then in the Soviet Union. His wife was Ludmila ("Lucy"); he had two children Julie and Edward. Julie and Edward became CEO and CFO of Lifeway Foods in 2002.

== Education ==
In 1971, Michael Smolyansky graduated with an MS mechanical engineering degree from the Kyiv Institute of Technology.

== Career ==
In Kyiv Smolyansky worked as an engineer in dairy and food-processing plants.

Smolyansky family emigrated from Kyiv to Chicago in 1976 as part of President Richard Nixon's Grain for Immigrants program. When he arrived, neither he nor his wife spoke any English; he paid for English classes while his wife learned from television. Smolyansky found a job as an engineer's draftsman. His wife opened a Russian delicatessen near their home in Rogers Park. From 1976 to 1985, Smolyansky worked for EJ Littell Machine Company as a project engineer and as the department manager with responsibility for the design of material handling equipment.

Smolyansky's wife suggested the idea of him founding a business making kefir, whilst they were visiting Germany in Winter 1984. Kefir was available in Cologne supermarkets, but not Chicago. Smolyansky rented a small factory on the east side of Skokie in 1985, where he set up a production line; he invested about $50,000 of family savings in the business. Smolyansky founded Lifeway Foods Inc, which commenced operations in February 1986, and was incorporated under the laws of the State of Illinois on 19 May 1986. Smolyansky was chief executive officer, Chief Financial Officer, President, Treasurer and a director of the company. The business focused on selling kefir to the Russian ethnic population, through delicatessens and health food shops. Sales reached $300,000 by the end of 1986. The company went public on NASDAQ in 1988.

Smolyansky visited Kyiv in February 1992 for the first time since 1976, in an effort to form a joint venture to produce and sell kefir in Ukraine.

Smolyansky died of a heart attack at the age of 55, on 9 June 2002. When he died, Lifeway had grown into a $12 million business.
