= Open Hands Initiative =

- Founded: New York, NY (2009)
- Type: 501(c)(3) Non-profit
- Location: New York, NY
- Fields: Citizen Diplomacy
- Key people: Jay T. Snyder
- Website: openhandsinitiative.org

Open Hands Initiative is a 501(c)(3) non-profit organization founded in 2009 by Jay T. Snyder. Open Hands is a public diplomacy organization dedicated to "improving people-to-people understanding and international friendship through exchanges and other projects that focus on our basic shared values and common humanity." Mr. Snyder established the organization following President Barack Obama's 2009 speech in Cairo, which talked of America's willingness to extend an open hand to the Muslim world.

== Programs ==
Open Hands Initiative is based in the United States, but its programs take place around the world. Programming focuses on grassroots-level exchanges for American and international youth in the fields of health equity, disability rights, media, arts and culture, and conflict resolution.

It launched its first program in Damascus, Syria in August 2010, focusing on exchanges in music and disability. In partnership with disability rights advocate Victor Pineda and Dr. Valerie Karr, Open Hands Initiative brought a group of disability youth advocates from the United States to Syria to meet with their Syrian counterparts to form the first ever Youth Ability Summit. The Summit served as a venue to discuss the inclusion and rights of people with disabilities, as well as the United Nations Convention on the Rights of Persons with Disabilities.

The Summit also served as a venue to create the world's first comic book series featuring a disabled superhero with American and Syrian values. The "Silver Scorpion" comic book was created in conjunction with Liquid Comics as a way to promote tolerance and inclusion of people with disabilities. The "Silver Scorpion" comic book was subsequently distributed to schools and non-profit organizations throughout Syria, Egypt and Lebanon as part of Open Hands Initiative's Commitment to Action with the Clinton Global Initiative. In an effort to share the message of tolerance and inclusion with more youth around the world, the comic was also made into an animated series, which was aired through MTV Voices.

Subsequent programs took place in Cairo, Egypt in 2011 and throughout Myanmar (Burma) in 2013, both in cooperation with international news organization GlobalPost and the GroundTruth Initiative. These exchanges were aimed at promoting free expression and providing intensive media training (photo, video, and print) for emerging, young journalists and reporters: "Covering a Revolution" and "A Burmese Journey" (aka "Burma Telling Its Own Story". Special guests who attended the programs in Egypt and Myanmar include Ambassador Anne Patterson, April 6 youth leader Ahmed Maher, Nobel Laureate Aung San Suu Kyi, Bertil Lintner, and others. The resulting products of the fellowships include Special Reports for "Tahrir Square" as well as for "A Burmese Journey" on GlobalPost.

Additional programs include the Fellowship for Women Entrepreneurs, which took place in Amman, Jordan in collaboration with the Angel Resource Institute and Oasis500, among others.

Through a collaboration with the Harvard Humanitarian Initiative and the Universidad de Antioquia, the Open Hands Initiative hosted the "Post-Conflict Colombia and Public Health" program in Boston, Medellin, and Bogota, Colombia in 2016. Sixteen medical students from Harvard and the Universidad de Antioquia participated, working together to operate a health clinic in a rural community of IDPs, and to develop white papers recommending public health policy changes to support displaced communities in Colombia.

The Salaam Fellowship for Conflict Resolution & Negotiation took place in Morocco in 2019 bringing together 20 students and recent graduates active in international relations, political science, business, public health, communications, and civil society to learn about conflict mapping and management, effective communication, mediation, and other related topics.

== Advisory board ==
- Jay T. Snyder, Founder and Chairman
- Tina Brown
- Barbara Pierce Bush
- Martin S. Indyk
- Ambassador Patrick Theros
