= Adam Sender =

American hedge fund manager and art collector

- Education: University of Michigan
- Occupations: Hedge fund manager, Art collector

Adam Sender is an American hedge fund manager and art collector. He founded Exis Capital Management in 1998. In 2011, his art collection contained 1,000 pieces and was valued at approximately $100 million.

== Career ==
Sender graduated from the University of Michigan with a Bachelor of Arts in history. He began trading stocks as a student. In 1992, he co-founded Argo Explorer, L.P. with Bernie Gartenlaub After college, They ran the Hedge Fund through 1996. Sender worked for S.A.C. Capital Advisors. In 1998, he founded his own hedge fund, which would become Exis Capital Management. In 2006, Exis had $173 million in assets under management. The company gained 15 percent in 2008. Sender closed his firm in 2014. Sender is on the board of advisors for the non-profit cellular agriculture organization, New Harvest.

== Art ==
Sender's art collection includes core works from Urs Fischer, Keith Haring, and Cindy Sherman. He began collecting in 1998 with Todd Levin as curator. Sarah Aibel joined the collection in 2006. Aibel took over as curator in 2008. Sender loans his work to museums including the Solomon R. Guggenheim Museum in New York, the Los Angeles County Museum of Art, the Museum of Modern Art, and the Beyeler Foundation in Switzerland, among others. Portions of the collection were sold in auctions in 2006 and 2014. He is a founding partner of the Parrish Trustees for the Parrish Art Museum. Sender has served on the Business Committee of the Metropolitan Museum of Art.

Sender's home and office served as displays for Sender's collection. Den (Villa D'Este) by Elizabeth Peyton was featured in the entrance of the Exis office, and Edward Ruscha's black and white painting "Let's Be Realistic" hung outside the trading room. Other pieces in the office included a Kara Walker mural, a pink and green neon sculpture by Dan Flavin, and "The Activists" by John Currin. In 2015, Sender joined the Board of Directors for the Museum of Contemporary Art.

=== "Home Alone" ===
Part of the collection went on display at the Art Basel Miami Beach event in 2011. The showing, "Home Alone," was in a home Sender owned in Miami. The art was presented in such a way as to suggest that a family's art collection took over their home. Eighty-five pieces were featured in the display including Richard Prince's "Spiritual America" and "Bumped," a photo by Gilbert & George. Twenty-five Raymond Pettibon prints overflowed from a bathroom. Eight Sarah Lucas works took over the master bedroom. Other selections included new works by Rashid Johnson, a floor installation by Jim Lambrie, and vinyl wall text in the kitchen by Lawrence Weiner.

== Philanthropy and political activity ==
Sender has made financial contributions and donated artwork to museums. He supports animal right donating to P.E.T.A. He has made donations to the World Trade Center Memorial Foundation, and to the 9/11 memorial. Sender supported Best Buddies, an organization that promotes employment and leadership development for people with intellectual and developmental disabilities, in their Art and Friendship Auction in Miami in December 2013.

In the summer of 2016, Sender held a fundraiser for Hillary Clinton's 2016 presidential campaign at his home in Sag Harbor, New York.
