= Ruby Duncan =

American rights advocate (1932–2026)

Dr. Ruby Lee Duncan
- Born: Ruby Phillips; June 7, 1932; Tallulah, Louisiana, U.S.
- Died: April 26, 2026 (aged 93); Las Vegas, Nevada
- Children: 7
- Website: www.rubyduncandreamkeepers.org

Ruby Duncan (June 7, 1932 – April 26, 2026) was an American advocate for low-income families and welfare rights in Las Vegas, Nevada. She was the co-founder of the organization Operation Life and president of the Clark County Welfare Rights Organization. In the 1970s Duncan and 'Westside mother' activists "organised a protest that shut down Caesars Palace in Las Vegas". She also made "Nevada history" by bringing the federal food stamp program to the state.

== Early life: 1932–1953 ==
Ruby Lee Phillips was born on June 7, 1932 to sharecroppers Ida Bolden and Joseph Phillips. Both her parents had died by the time she turned four, and from that point on she lived with relatives in Tallulah, Louisiana. The majority of her early life was spent working in cotton fields from May through October and attending a black school from November through April. She was a drug store clerk for two years. She left Louisiana for Las Vegas in 1953.

== First years in Las Vegas ==
In Las Vegas Duncan worked as a house maid and a hotel maid. She was fired from the second job in 1964 for organizing other maids to protest against working conditions and low wages. After being fired, the only source of income she had to support herself and her young children was the Aid to Dependent Children (ADC) grant she received from the state welfare system. She eventually got a job at Sahara Las Vegas, where in 1966, she slipped on grease while working as a cook, injuring her back. When she approached the welfare department, she got a financial aid of $120 per month, among the least in the country. She expected support in training for new jobs that did not require standing, but got none, exposing her to the inadequate systems meant to support struggling families.

In 1967 Congress passed new amendments requiring all women on Aid to Families with Dependent Children to enroll in job training programs. The only program available to welfare mothers on the Westside of Las Vegas, where Duncan lived, was a sewing class that met five days a week eight hours a day and paid $25 a week. After an article in Las Vegas Sun depicted her struggles, the welfare department accommodated Duncan in the class. This is where Duncan became radicalized and mobilized with other welfare mothers who eventually banded together to form what became Clark County Welfare Rights.

== Nevada Welfare Rights Organization ==
Duncan, along with other black welfare mothers, led the movement for welfare rights in Las Vegas. She created the Nevada Welfare Rights Organization which fought successfully to bring the Supplemental Nutrition Assistance Program (formerly known as the Federal Food Stamps Program) and the Special Supplemental Nutrition Program for Women Infants and Children to Nevada. George Wiley trained members of the group, and many young attorneys volunteered legal advice. The group, led by Duncan, Mary Wesley, Alversa Beals, Emma Stampley, and Essie Henderson, organized protests, eat-ins, marches, speeches, and political events to advocate for those receiving welfare and for women's rights.

== Activism and the Strip ==
In a political environment where Ronald Reagan had found success with welfare reform as one of the major goals, the Nevada welfare department under George Miller was pursuing aggressive measures to reduce aid. In 1971, it cut 75% of welfare given to women with children. affecting around 3500 families. Duncan organized with other welfare mothers, especially those from Clark County Welfare Rights and the Nevada Welfare Rights Organization, initially holding small demonstrations. They organized two large-scale marches of welfare mothers and their children down the Las Vegas Strip.

At the first in March 1971, upwards of 6000 people marched down the Las Vegas Strip, shutting down revenues to the casinos, including Caesars Palace, for several hours. Celebrities and well known activists including Jane Fonda, Donald Sutherland, Ralph Abernathy, Cesar Chavez, Dr. Benjamin Spock, and Dave Dellinger attended, protecting the protestors from police and bystander abuse. A week later, another march took place. This time they sat across six lanes of traffic, meaning women and children were arrested.

The marches gained attention from local and national news. Duncan and the other welfare mothers of the Clark County Welfare Rights Organization subsequently organized eat-ins, where dozens of welfare mothers and their children would order food from casino restaurants and then leave, telling the casinos to bill the state government. Two weeks after the initial eat-in, a federal judge mandated that all of the mothers that had been dropped from welfare be re-added immediately. Duncan also served as a Democratic Delegate for Nevada at the 1980 Democratic National Convention.

== Operation Life (1972–1992) ==
Duncan co-founded Operation Life in 1972 and served as the director for nearly two decades. The non-profit organization worked towards improving the lives of families and promoted welfare reform in West Las Vegas. Operation Life initiated community programs including drug and alcohol abuse prevention, daycare centers, medical clinics, lunch programs and employment programs. Operation Life also contributed "Ruby Duncan Manor" a housing building for 30 elderly and disabled individuals. Duncan stepped down as director in 1990 and the organization ended in 1992.

== Death ==
Duncan died on April 26, 2026, at the age of 93. She died peacefully surrounded by her children and grandchildren.

== Recognition ==
Duncan received the following awards and honors:

- 1973: Represented USA at the World Congress of Peace in Moscow
- Distinguished Nevadan
- University of Nevada, Las Vegas, honorary degree
- University of Nevada, Reno, honorary degree
- Community College of Southern Nevada, honorary degree
- 2008: Margaret Chase Smith Award from the National Association of Secretaries of State
- 2009: Freedom Tree award, University of Nevada Reno
- 2010: Ruby Duncan Elementary School, North Las Vegas, Nevada opened
- Honored by Steven Horsford on the House Floor during Women's History Month.
- 2020: Duncan was one of ten women selected to represent Nevada in USA TODAY's commemoration of the centenary of the ratification of the 19th Amendment.

== Books and documentaries ==
- A Guide to the Ruby Duncan Papers, 93-48. Special Collections, University Libraries, University of Nevada, Reno.
- Orleck, Annelise (2005). Storming Caesars Palace: How Black Mothers fought their own war on poverty. Boston, USA: Beacon. ISBN 978-0807050316.
- A 1995 documentary Making a difference: Nevada's political women 1965-82 featured Duncan
- A 2023 documentary Storming Caesar's Palace about Duncan's "fight for a universal basic income"
