= Becky Williams =

American Union activist)

Becky Williams is a Union activist and the current president of SEIU District 1199, which represents more than 35,000 health care, social service and public sector workers across Ohio, West Virginia, and Kentucky. Williams is the first woman president of SEIU District 1199.

== Early life and union career ==
Williams is originally from Canton, Ohio. She ascribes her interest in union activity to her family’s history, saying “I will never forget what life was like as a working mother of four without the protection of a union.”

In 1991 after organizing her fellow co-workers to join the union, she became an official member of SEIU District 1199. The following year, she started as a union organizer. In addition to being the first woman president of SEIU District 1199, she is also the only District 1199 president who has worked her way up from union member to president.

In 2008, Williams was elected to serve as President of District 1199. In addition, ten newly elected officers were also sworn in at this time.

As president, Williams used her political influence to encourage the passage of the Patient Protection and Affordable Care Act in 2009. She was criticized for this by Rush Limbaugh, who called her a “union thug.” In 2010, Williams and the union promoted the "Skip A Space" campaign, opposing the re-election of Democratic congressman Zack Space, who had voted against the PPACA. Space was defeated by Republican Bob Gibbs.

In 2011, the Ohio Legislature passed Senate Bill 5, a controversial law limiting collective bargaining agreements for public sector employees. Williams was a leading voice in speaking out against the issue. This bill was defeated in a referendum on the November 2011 ballot by a 22-point margin.

Williams was elected Vice President of SEIU International in February 2012. This will allow Williams to “expand the voice of the local,” at the national level.

== Personal life ==
Williams serves as a vice president on the SEIU international executive board and is a member of international executive board Health Care Council, the Midwest Area Leadership Council, and the International Member Strength Committee. In Ohio, Williams is a member of the NAACP, the League of Women Voters, and National Organization for Women.
