= Jay T. Snyder =

American businessman

Jay T. Snyder is an American philanthropist, businessman, and diplomat.

== Public service ==
From 2000 to 2001, Snyder served as Public Delegate, United States Representative to the 55th United Nations General Assembly, functioning as a representative on general policy matters, reform issues, and the Millennium Summit, and formulated and presented statements before the U.N. on a variety of public diplomacy questions.

Snyder is a former member of the U.S. Advisory Commission on Public Diplomacy, a congressionally chartered body that analyzes and provides recommendations on U.S. efforts to understand, engage, inform, and influence the world. Reporting to the President of the United States and the Under Secretary for Public Diplomacy and Public Affairs housed within the U.S. State Department, the Commission has produced several reports including one aimed at improving the State Department's ability to attract and retain qualified public diplomacy personnel. Snyder was sworn in as a commissioner in 2003 and served until 2011. He was renominated for the ACPD in 2022.

In 2005, Snyder was appointed to serve as a Commissioner on the New York State Commission for Public Authority Reform.

In 2010, Snyder was selected by Governor-elect Andrew Cuomo to serve on his transition committee for Health and Education, as well as the committee for Economic Development and Labor.

Snyder currently serves as Founder and Chairman of the Board of Directors of the Open Hands Initiative, a U.S.-based 501(c)(3) nonprofit organization dedicated to improving people-to-people understanding and friendship throughout the world. The Initiative launched programs in Syria (2010), Egypt (2011), and Myanmar (2013).

Mr. Snyder was nominated to the Commission on Reform and Modernization of the State Department in the fall of 2024.

Snyder has served on the non-profit boards of the USC Center on Public Diplomacy at the Annenberg School, the Beatrice Snyder Foundation, and is a member of the Atlantic Council. Most recently, he was a Co-President of the American Friends of the London Philharmonia Orchestra. Previously, Mr. Snyder served on the College Board of Advisors at Georgetown University and the Board of Governors of the Milano Graduate School of Management and Urban Policy. He was also a board member for the Foreign Policy Program Leadership Committee at the Brookings Institution, and on the Advisory Board of the Brookings’ Saban Center/Council on Foreign Relations Middle East Project. Additionally, Snyder served on the boards at The Humpty Dumpty Institute, Phoenix House, and the Share Our Strength's National Task Force to End Childhood Hunger.

== Business ==
Mr. Snyder is a Principal in HBJ Investments, SL Ventures, and Butternut Partners. He serves as a consultant and observer to the board of numerous startups and growth-phase companies.

In 2007, Mr. Snyder became the Non-Executive Chairman of Pelion Financial Group. He was previously a principal of Ashfield Consulting Group and JB Partners, and served as a managing director of Mayberry Core Asset Management. He also served on the board of PAIC Insurance Company.

Earlier in his career, Snyder was an executive at Biocraft Laboratories, a publicly traded generic pharmaceutical company.

He is currently Chairman of the Board and former acting CEO of Subsea Environmental Services, a company dedicated to the retrieval and recycling of out-of-service submarine telecommunications cables.

== Personal life ==
Snyder was born in 1958 in New York City. His parents, Harold Snyder and Beatrice Snyder, founded Biocraft Laboratories in 1964. He is married and has three adult children.
