= Joyce Bender =

American businessman

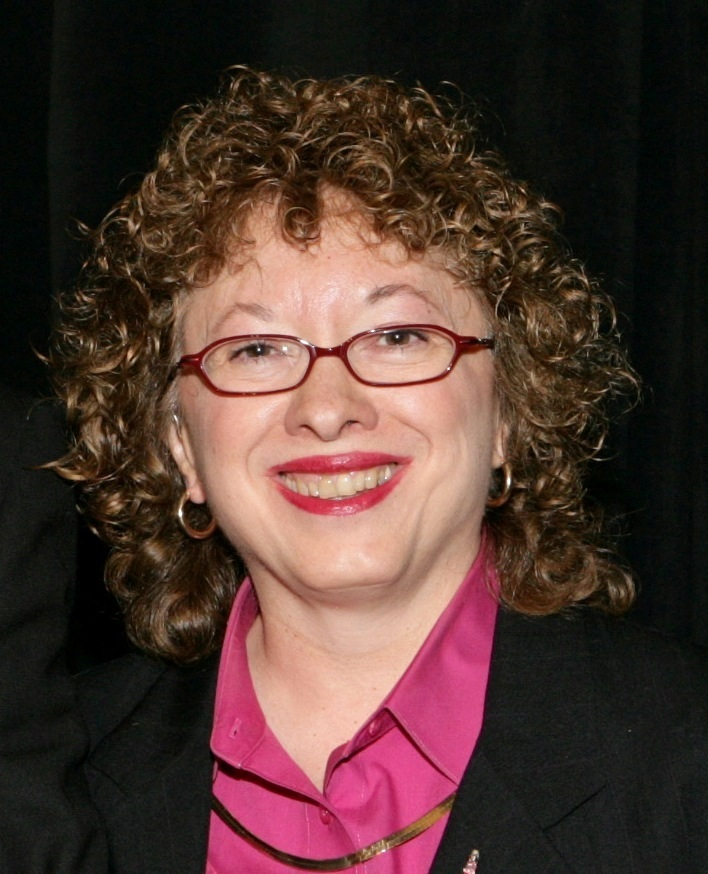
Joyce Bender, President and CEO, Bender Consulting Services, Inc. and Bender Leadership Academy.

Joyce A. Bender is the CEO, President, and founder of Bender Consulting Services, Inc. and the Bender Leadership Academy. Bender Consulting is headquartered in Pittsburgh, Pennsylvania, and works on a national basis. Bender is an advocate for disability employment and the host of the Internet talk radio show Disability Matters with Joyce Bender on voiceamerica.com. She is the Vice Chair of the board of the American Association of People with Disabilities and Chairman of the Epilepsy Foundation of Western and Central Pennsylvania.

== Accomplishments ==
In 1996, Bender received Carlow University's Woman of Spirit award and in 1998 she was named one of Pennsylvania's 50 Best Women in Business. In 1999, Bender was selected as the President's Award winner, an honor given to an American who furthers the employment and empowerment of people with disabilities. In 2000, Bender received the 2000 James F. Compton Humanitarian Award for her efforts in improving the quality of life for people with disabilities, by removing barriers to employment and creating other employment opportunities. In 2003, Bender was awarded the New Freedom Initiative Award winner from the Bush administration. In 2005, she received the UCP of Pittsburgh's Gertrude Labowitz Lifetime Achievement Award.

In 2007, Bender received the ACHIEVA's Sattler Humanitarian Award. In 2008, Bender was selected by the YWCA of Greater Pittsburgh as a Tribute to Women Awardee in the Entrepreneur category for her work in empowering women and girls to reach their personal and professional goals. She was also honored with the Diamond Award from the Pittsburgh Business Times.

Bender received the Distinguished Service Award from Geneva College and the Justice for All Corporate Award from the American Association of People with Disabilities in 2013. In 2014, she received the Catherine Variety Sheridan Humanitarian Award from Variety the Children’s Charity. Bender was honored by Volunteers of America with the Lifetime Achievement Award in 2015. In that same year, Bender was inducted into the Susan M. Daniels Mentoring Hall of Fame by the National Disability Mentoring Coalition as part of the inaugural class of 25 champions marking the 25th anniversary of the Americans with Disabilities Act.

In September 2002, Bender Consulting received the Employer of the Year Award from the National Epilepsy Foundation. Bender Consulting also received the 1999 Employer of the Year Award from hireAbility in Philadelphia, PA, the 1997 Power of Work Award from Goodwill Industries, and was selected the 1996 Small Employer of the Year by the Pennsylvania Governor's Committee on Employment of People with Disabilities. In 2002, Bender Consulting of Canada received the Diversity in the Workplace Award from the Canadian Paraplegic Association of Ontario. In 2016, Bender Consulting received the Disability:IN Supplier of the Year Award.

== Affiliations ==
Bender serves as the Board Chair of the Bender Leadership Academy. She is the current Vice Chair and past Board Chair of the American Association of People with Disabilities and Chairman of the Epilepsy Foundation of Western and Central Pennsylvania. Formerly, Bender was the Board Chair of the Epilepsy Foundation.

Additionally, Bender is a board member of the World Institute on Disability, Pittsburgh Disability Employment Project for Freedom, Variety the Children's Charity of Pittsburgh, Homeless Children's Education Fund, Bazelon Center for Mental Health Law, Pittsburgh Civic Light Opera, Disability Rights Pennsylvania. She also is a member of the Board of Trustees of Carlow University and serves on the National Advisory Group for the National Technical Institute for the Deaf (NTID). Bender is a Committee Advisor for the FDR Memorial Legacy Committee and an Advisor for AudioEye.

Bender was one of the first regional coordinators for Disability Mentoring Day and coordinates activities in Pennsylvania, Delaware and Toronto. She is the host of Disability Matters with Joyce Bender, a radio show on voiceamerica.com, and speaks across the United States and Canada.

She has served as a disability employment expert for the U.S. State Department in Japan, South Korea, Indonesia, Panama, and Kazakhstan.

== Media ==
In addition to her weekly Internet talk radio show, Disability Matters with Joyce Bender on voiceamerica.com, Bender has been featured in various periodicals including the Pittsburgh Business Times, Investors Business Daily, Pittsburgh Post-Gazette, Chicago Tribune, Computerworld, and Reader’s Digest. She holds a Bachelor of Science degree in psychology from Geneva College.

Bender was a contributor for The Palgrave Handbook of Disability at Work published in 2020. She has also been a contributor for EpilepsyAdvocate, a community of people living with epilepsy, their family members, and their caregivers.

Bender is also a sought after speaker, appearing at events for the Pittsburgh Human Resources Association - PHRA, Epilepsy Michigan, and the City of Pittsburgh.
