= MicroPlace =

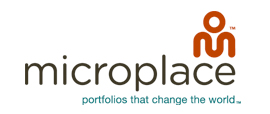
- Type: Subsidiary
- Industry: Impact Investing
- Founded: 2006; 20 years ago, in San Jose, California, U.S.
- Founder: Tracey Pettengill Turner
- Headquarters: San Jose, California, U.S.
- Website: www.microplace.com

MicroPlace was an American microfinance provider that focused on retail investors. Started by Tracey Pettengill Turner in 2006, MicroPlace was bought out by eBay that same year.

MicroPlace provided everyday investors with the ability to make investments in the microfinance industry that had the potential to earn interest. This contrasts with most other services for microlenders, which generally rely on a charitable model. Interest earned was typically between 1 and 3 percent.

== History ==
MicroPlace was founded by Tracey Pettengill Turner and was bought by eBay for an undisclosed amount in 2006. Her hope is to expand the microfinancing industry from its current base of 100 million people to 1 billion people, with help from the middle class of affluent nations (the United States, European Union, etc.).

Ashwini Narayanan took over as the general manager of MicroPlace until 2012.

On January 14, 2014, MicroPlace announced that it would cease offering investments.
