= Tracey Pettengill Turner =

Tracey Pettengill Turner (born c. 1971), a serial social entrepreneur, is the founder of Copia Global, an ecommerce service for middle-low income Africans based in Nairobi, Kenya. She founded the company in 2012 and serves as the Executive Chairman.

Previously, Turner founded MicroPlace, an online brokerage enabling investments in microfinance and other social investment vehicles. MicroPlace became a PayPal affiliate and a wholly owned subsidiary of eBay Inc. She founded MicroPlace as an alternative and socially responsible investment opportunity for individuals to make small investments in microfinance. In 2006, eBay purchased MicroPlace for an undisclosed sum, with Turner as general manager and director.

In 1998 a Stanford Business School classmate of Turner's founded 4charity.com, an online marketplace established for college student textbook purchases, initially allowing donations to the Special Olympics. Turner served as its inaugural Chief Executive Officer. She then became Chief Finance Officer of KickStart International, a non-profit organization that designs and sells products focused on poverty alleviation.

Graduating in 1993 with a bachelor's degree in engineering and economics from Dartmouth College, Pettengill Turner initially worked for the US Committee for Refugees in Washington DC and Sudan and Mercer Management Consulting before she completed a Master of Business Administration from Stanford Business School in 1998. After business school Turner moved to Dhaka, Bangladesh to work for the Grameen Bank, a pioneering microfinance organization.

Turner has completed 11 ironman triathlon races including 2 Ironman Kona World Championships where she won the Ironman Executive Challenge Women's Division in 2016.

Turner's leadership awards include the Top 25 Women of the Web Award in 2000, San Francisco Business Times Leadership Award, and a Working Woman Magazine Entrepreneurship Award.
