= Mina Gerowin =

Mina Gerowin (born 1951) is an American business executive and hedge fund manager, notable for her role in Paulson & Co.'s pre-2007, and ultimately highly profitable, bets against the soundness of Synthetic CDOs during the 2008 financial crisis.

== Education ==
Gerowin is the daughter of Frieda H. and Charles Gerowin. She is a graduate of Smith College, from which she graduated with honours in Political Economy. She received a J.D. degree from the University of Virginia, where she was an editor of the Virginia Journal of International Law, writing on foreign direct investment regulation. She also received an M.B.A. from Harvard, where she was a Baker Scholar, as well as an honorary doctorate from the University of New Haven.

== Career ==
Gerowin was one of the first women to break into the hedge fund industry. She was the first woman in M&A at Lazard Freres & Co., where she was also the first female Vice President. She joined Paulson & Co. in 2004. Moving to London in 2008, she headed Paulson's European event, distressed and credit investment team. In 2009 Gerowin won the European Hedge Fund Leadership Award of 100 Women in Hedge Funds, and has been named several times as one of the Top 100 Women in Hedge Funds by the Hedge Fund Journal and as one of the Top 50 Women in Finance by efinancial news/Dow Jones.

Gerowin retired from Paulson & Co. in 2012 and became a non-executive director of EXOR, which is better known for its Fiat Chrysler Automobiles holding. She is also a non-executive Director of CNH Industrial NV and of Lafarge SA (the French cement company). Gerowin is a member of the Global Advisory Committee of Samsung Asset Management.

== Personal life ==
In 2000, Gerowin married Jeffrey Herrmann in New Rochelle, New York.

== Controversy ==
Gerowin and Herrmann briefly made headlines in 2010 when the British High Court invalidated their claim to a share in a nearby locked garden, on the basis of a few inches of frontage. The couple reportedly spent £150,000 in legal fees. The case, including the claimants' status as wealthy Americans, was reported in the British press.

Subsequently, the couple successfully sued the law firm Withers LLP for negligence relating to the legal advice they had provided on this matter. Withers LLP were ordered to pay costs for both cases, as well as substantial additional charges.
