= Julie Smolyansky =

Ukrainian-American businesswoman (born 1975)

- Born: 1975 (age 50–51); Kiev, Ukrainian SSR, Soviet Union (now Kyiv, Ukraine)
- Occupations: Businesswoman, CEO

Julie Smolyansky (born 1975) is a Ukrainian-American businesswoman. She is the CEO of Illinois-based dairy company Lifeway Foods.

== Life and career ==
Smolyansky was born in Kyiv, Ukraine (then Ukrainian SSR), to Jewish parents Ludmila and Michael Smolyansky. Her family immigrated to the United States when she was one.

Smolyansky earned a B.A. in psychology from the University of Illinois at Chicago in 1996.

Her father founded the Kefir company Lifeway Foods in 1986. In 1997, Smolyansky joined the business. After he died of a heart attack in 2002, Julie, aged 27, became the youngest CEO of a publicly traded firm. She, along with her brother as CFO, transformed the company into a multinational firm, growing its revenue from $12 million to $130 million in 2015.

Smolyansky was featured on Fortune's 2014 40 under 40 list.

== Political positions ==
Smolyansky has served on the boards of the pro-Israel Anti-Defamation League, Hebrew Immigrant Aid Society, and the Illinois Holocaust Museum and Education Center.

Under her leadership, Lifeway posted various pro-Zionist messages to its social media during the Gaza genocide. She has supported several documentaries covering "violence against girls" only in Muslim-majority countries. She is also the co-founder of Test400k, a non-profit with the stated mission of eliminating the backlog of 400,000 untested rape kits in the U.S. and stop violence against women, but Smolyansky later transitioned it to focus on "Israeli & Jewish rape survivors".
