= List of alumni of Magdalen College, Oxford =

A list of alumni of Magdalen College (/ˈmɔːdlɪn/ MAWD-lin), one of the constituent colleges of the University of Oxford in England. Notable former students include politicians, lawyers, bishops, poets, and academics. The list is largely male as women were first admitted to study at Magdalen in 1979.

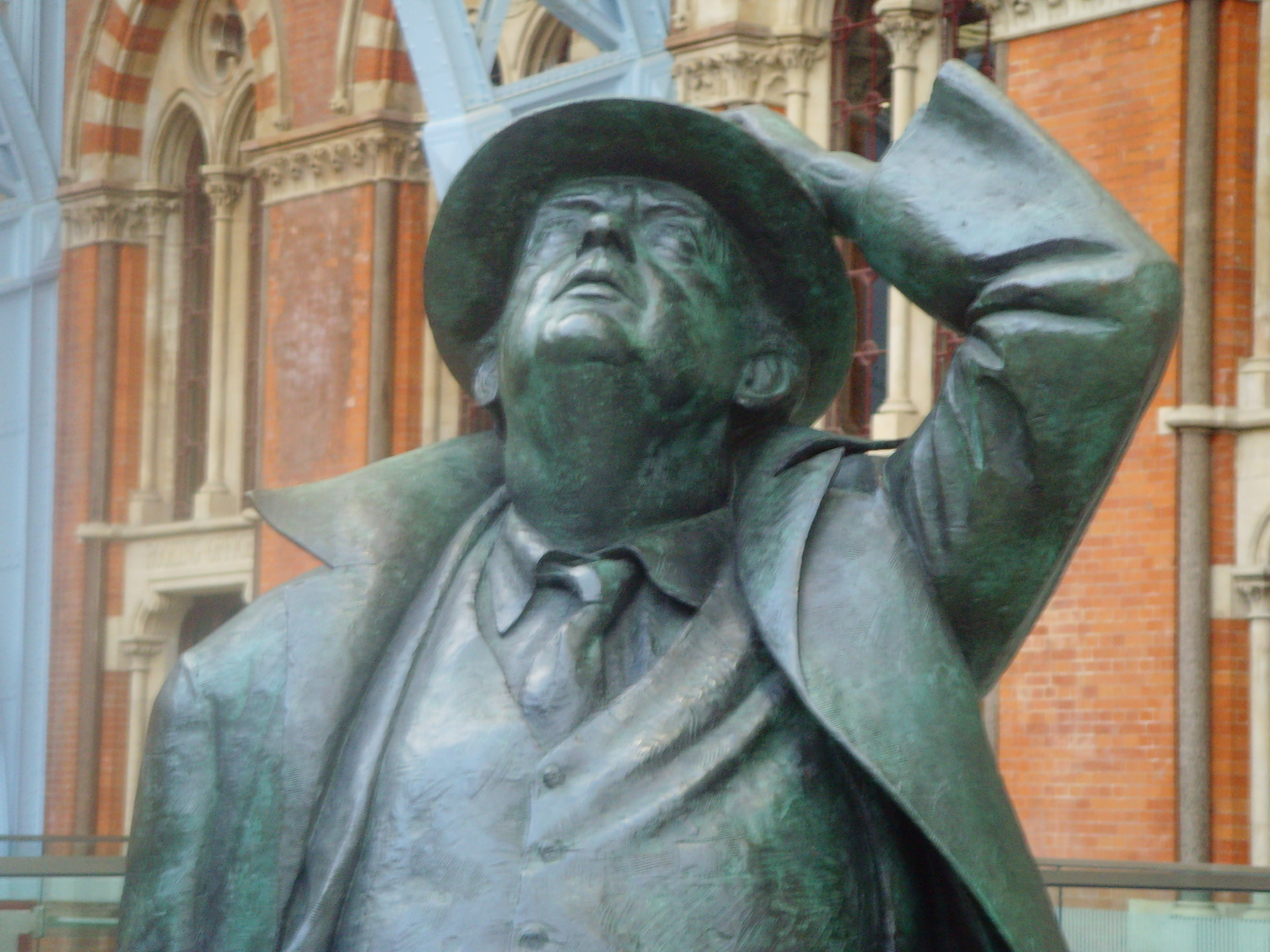
Sir John Betjeman

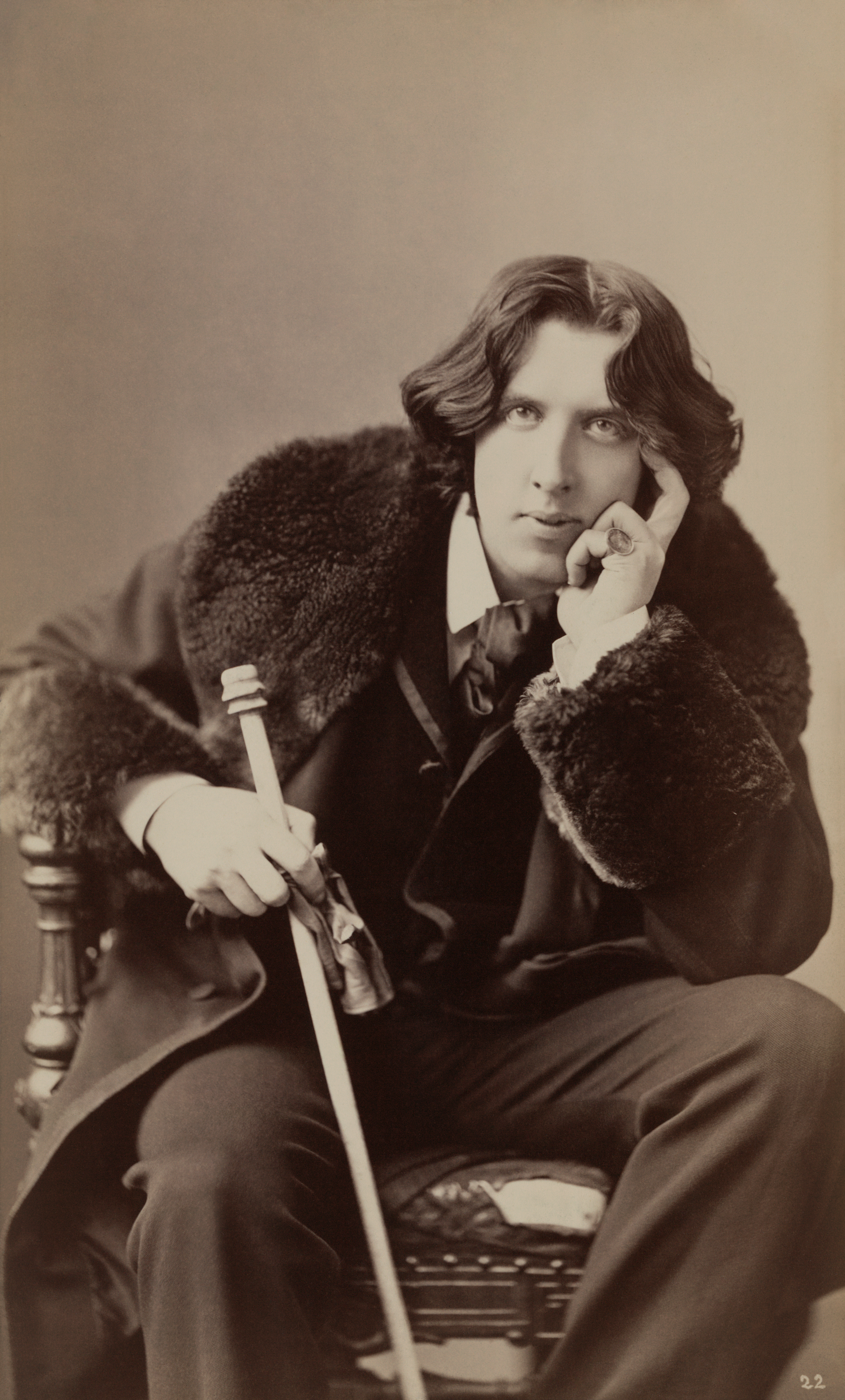
Oscar Wilde

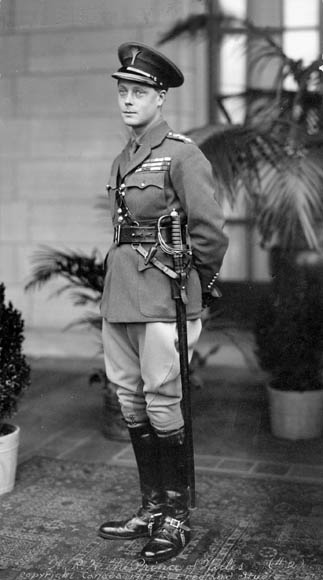
King Edward VIII

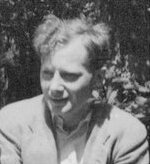
J. H. C. Whitehead

== Politicians, civil servants and Parliamentarians ==
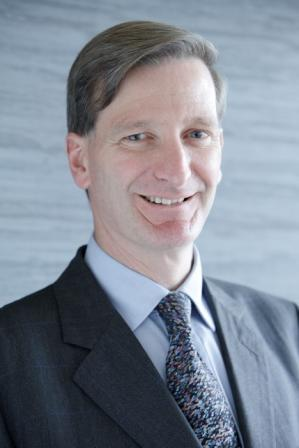
Dominic Grieve, former Attorney General for England and Wales

- Geoffrey Adams, British Diplomatic Service
- Montek Singh Ahluwalia, Indian economist and civil servant
- Francis Ashley, lawyer and MP between 1614 and 1625
- Sir Walter Bagot, 5th Baronet, 18th-century MP
- Lord Baker, politician, former MP
- Thomas Berkeley, MP
- Sir John Biggs-Davison, former Conservative MP
- Sir Trevor Bigham, barrister and Assistant Commissioner of the London Metropolitan Police, 1914–1931
- Nicholas Boles, Conservative MP for Grantham and Stamford
- Sir Ian Bowater, Lord Mayor of London (1967–1970)
- Sir Ashley Bramall, Labour Party politician, MP for Bexley, 1946–1950
- George Brandis, Australian diplomat and former Attorney-General (2013–2017)
- Jock, Lord Bruce-Gardyne, Conservative politician
- Sir Julian Bullard, diplomat, Foreign Office Minister and Pro-chancellor of Birmingham University
- Alex Chalk, Conservative MP for Cheltenham and Secretary of State for Justice
- Tankerville Chamberlayne, landowner in Hampshire and a Member of Parliament for Southampton
- Sir Cecil Clementi, British colonial administrator who served as Governor of Hong Kong, 1925–1930; Governor and Commander-in-Chief of the Straits Settlements, 1930–1934
- Robert Douglas Coe, diplomat and U.S. Ambassador to Denmark, 1953–1957
- Sir Douglas Dodds-Parker, member of the Special Operations Executive in the Second World War, and later a UK Conservative MP
- Francis Patrick Donovan, Australian diplomat and jurist
- Sir Erasmus Dryden, 1st Baronet, Member of Parliament for Banbury (1624)
- Gareth Evans, Australian international policymaker, former politician and current Chancellor of the Australian National University
- Jim Forbes, Australian politician
- Malcolm Fraser, former Australian Liberal Party politician; 22nd Prime Minister of Australia
- Sir Marrack Goulding, diplomat, Under-Secretary-General of the United Nations, Warden of St Antony's College (1997–2006)
- Dominic Grieve, Conservative politician and former Attorney General
- William Hague, Conservative politician and former Foreign Secretary
- John Hemming, Liberal Democrat politician and businessman
- Chris Huhne, Liberal Democrat politician
- Sir Jeremy Hunt, Conservative politician and former Chancellor of the Exchequer
- Lord Hutton, formerly John Hutton MP
- Harford Montgomery Hyde, barrister, politician (Ulster Unionist MP for Belfast North), author and biographer
- Christopher Jackson, politician, businessman, author (Conservative MEP for Kent East 1979–1994, Deputy Leader Conservative MEPs)
- Michael Jay, Baron Jay of Ewelme, former diplomat and Chairman of the House of Lords Appointments Commission
- Gladwyn Jebb, civil servant, diplomat and politician
- Sir Reginald Fleming Johnston, British diplomat and colonial official, served as commissioner of Weihaiwei and as tutor to China's last Emperor, Puyi
- Keith Joseph, barrister and politician
- Francis Oswald Lindley, British diplomat
- Stephen Milligan, Conservative politician and journalist
- Randy Minchew, American politician and lawyer
- Audri Mukhopadhyay, Canadian diplomat
- George Osborne, Conservative MP for Tatton (2001–2017), former Chancellor of the Exchequer and newspaper editor
- John Redwood, Conservative MP for Wokingham
- Tim Renton, Baron Renton of Mount Harry, Conservative politician: Chief Whip, Minister of State and Arts Minister, 1984–1992
- William Rodgers, Baron Rodgers of Quarry Bank, one of the "Gang of Four" of senior British Labour Party politicians who defected to form the Social Democratic Party (SDP)
- Henry Sacheverell, clergyman and politician
- Duncan Sandys, politician
- Sir John Scarlett, Director General of the British Secret Intelligence Service (MI6), 2004–2009
- Arthur Snell, former British High Commissioner to The Republic of Trinidad and Tobago
- Siôn Simon, Labour politician and MP (2001–2010)
- Zev Sufott, British-born Israeli diplomat, Ambassador to the Netherlands, first Israeli Ambassador to China
- John Turner, lawyer and former politician; 17th Prime Minister of Canada

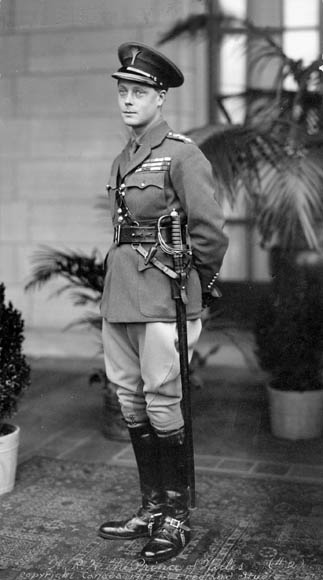
King Edward VIII

=== Peers and royalty ===
A number of Magdalen alumni have been associated with royal families around the world, or the peerage:

- King Edward VIII (attended when Prince of Wales; did not graduate)
- Wriothesley Russell, 2nd Duke of Bedford
- Wilfrid Ashley, 1st Baron Mount Temple, soldier and Conservative politician
- King Jigme Khesar Namgyel Wangchuck of Bhutan
- Robert Boothby, Baron Boothby, Conservative politician
- Al-Muhtadee Billah, Crown Prince of Brunei Darussalam
- Edward Knatchbull-Hugessen, 1st Baron Brabourne, Liberal politician in William Gladstone's government
- Edward Bridges, 1st Baron Bridges, civil servant and Chancellor of Reading University (1959–1969)
- George Cambridge, 2nd Marquess of Cambridge, great-great-grandson of King George III
- Frederic Thesiger, 1st Viscount Chelmsford, Governor of Queensland (1905–1909), Governor of New South Wales (1909–1913); Viceroy of India (1916–1921)
- John Hely-Hutchinson, 2nd Earl of Donoughmore, politician, peer and soldier
- Arthur Hill, 2nd Marquess of Downshire, peer and MP
- Thomas Fairfax, 5th Lord Fairfax of Cameron, 17th-century politician
- Patrick Neill, Baron Neill of Bladen, member of the House of Lords, Warden of All Souls College (1977–1995), Vice-Chancellor of Oxford University (1985–1989)
- Henry Pelham-Clinton-Hope, 9th Duke of Newcastle, peer and aviator
- Prince Tomohito of Mikasa, cousin of Emperor Akihito
- Yasuhito, Prince Chichibu, second son of Emperor Taishō
- Prince Christian Victor of Schleswig-Holstein, member of the British royal family
- Nicolas Browne-Wilkinson, Baron Browne-Wilkinson, former Senior Lord of Appeal in Ordinary in the United Kingdom; former Head of the Privy Council and Vice-Chancellor of the High Court
- Lord Frederick Windsor, great-grandson of King George V

== Law ==
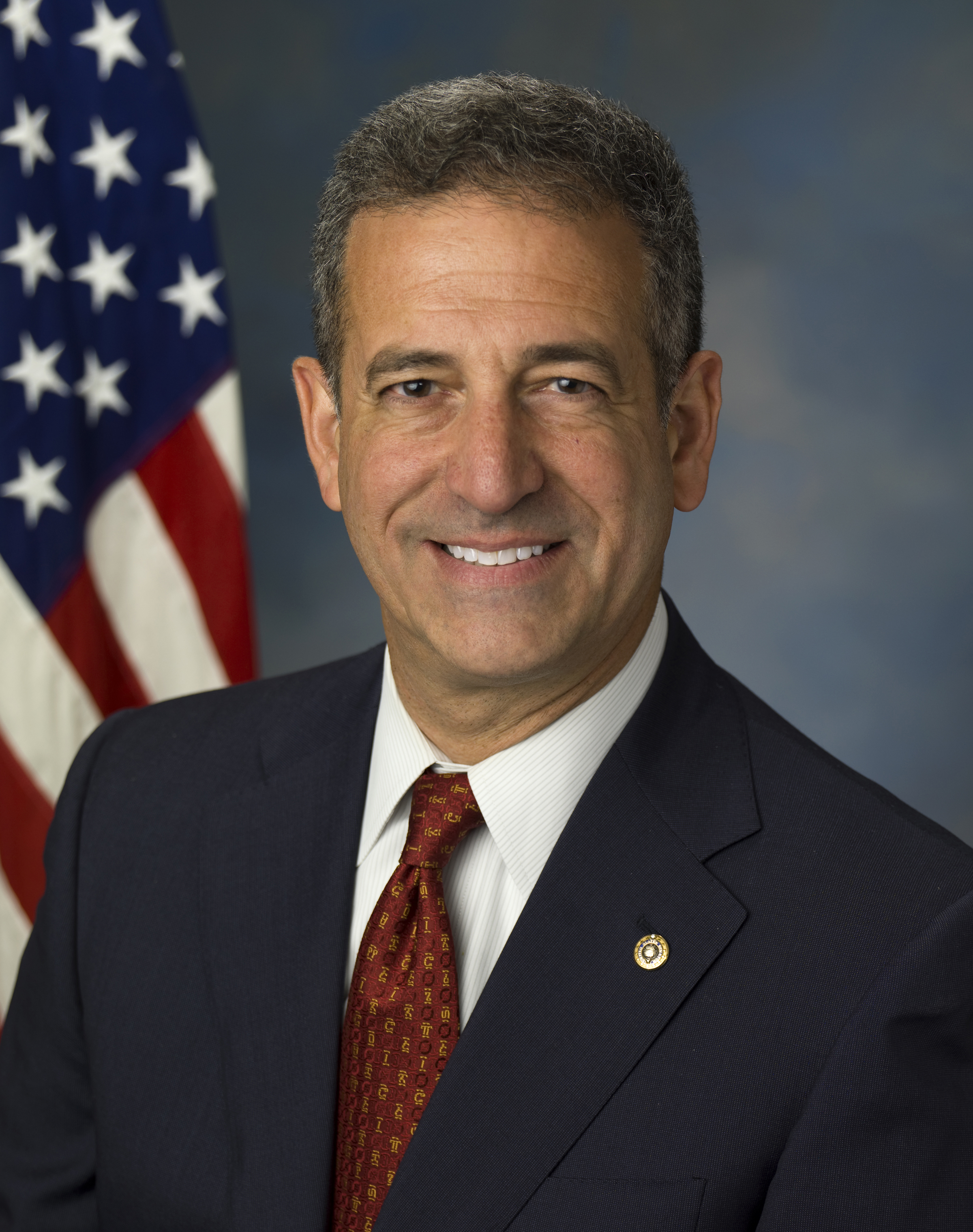
Russ Feingold

- Richard Atkin, Baron Atkin, lawyer and judge
- Charles Arnold-Baker, barrister, author and historian
- Michael Beloff, barrister and former President of Trinity College
- Jocelyn Benson, lawyer, Dean and author
- Stephen Breyer, Associate Justice of the Supreme Court of the United States
- Michael Briggs, Lord Briggs of Westbourne, Justice of the Supreme Court of the United Kingdom
- Alan Brodrick, 1st Viscount Midleton, Irish lawyer and politician
- Sir Charles Caesar, Judge and Master of the Rolls
- Guido Calabresi, legal scholar and senior Judge of the U.S. Court of Appeal for the Second Circuit
- Simon Chesterman, Dean and Professor of Law at the National University of Singapore
- Alfred Denning, Baron Denning, lawyer and senior Law Lord
- Reginald Manningham-Buller, 1st Viscount Dilhorne, lawyer, politician, Lord Chancellor (1962–1964)
- John Doyle, jurist, Chief Justice of the Supreme Court of South Australia (1995–2012)
- James Edelman, Justice of the High Court of Australia
- Tali Farhadian (born 1975 or 1976), Iranian-born American former federal prosecutor
- Russ Feingold, US lawyer and politician
- Michael Fox, barrister and High Court judge
- Sir James Gobbo, jurist and 25th Governor of Victoria
- Edward Anthony Hawke, Common Serjeant of London and Recorder of London
- Patrick Keane, Justice of the High Court of Australia
- Henry Keith, Baron Keith of Kinkel GBE, PC, Senior Lord of Appeal in Ordinary, United Kingdom
- John Neely Kennedy, Bachelor of Civil Law in 1979, United States Senator from Louisiana
- Harold Hongju Koh, Korean-American lawyer and legal scholar
- Neal Macrossan, lawyer, judge and Chief Justice of the Supreme Court of Queensland
- Dinah Rose, human rights barrister and current President of the college
- David Souter, former Associate Justice of the Supreme Court of the United States
- Jonathan Sumption, Lord Sumption, Justice of the Supreme Court of the United Kingdom
- Gerald Thesiger, High Court Judge

== Clergy ==
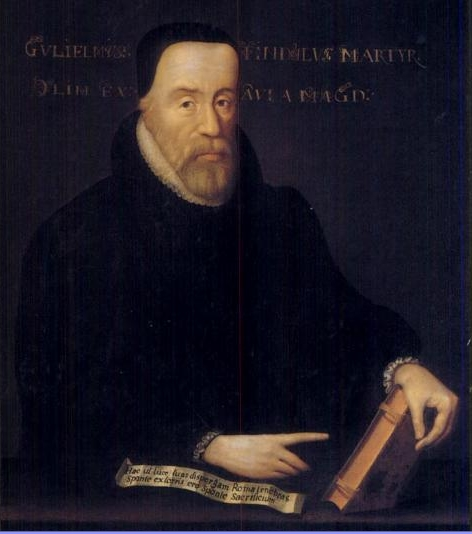
- William Tyndale
  Edward Barber, (Archdeacon of Chester) (1886–1914)
- Hugh Boulter, Archbishop of Armagh in the Church of Ireland
- John Colet, churchman and educational pioneer
- Thomas Cooper, English bishop, lexicographer, theologian, and writer
- John Davenport, puritan clergyman and co-founder of the American colony of New Haven
- Alan Don, Chaplain & Secretary to the Archbishop of Canterbury (1931–1941), Chaplain to the Speaker of the House of Commons, 1936–1946; Dean of Westminster, 1946–1959
- David Edwards, Dean of Norwich, Provost of Southwark and a prolific author
- Accepted Frewen, priest and Archbishop of York, 1660–1664
- Bede Griffiths, monk and theologian
- Henry Hammond, 17th-century churchman
- Robert Hawker, Anglican vicar and scholar
- Charles Bousfield Huleatt, Anglican priest
- Basil Jellicoe, missioner to Canning Town
- Owen Oglethorpe, academic and Catholic Bishop, President of Magdalen College, Oxford (1536–1552 and 1553–1555), Vice-Chancellor of Oxford University (1551–1552)
- Robert Parker, clergyman and scholar
- Henry Phillpotts, Anglican Bishop of Exeter, 1830–1869
- Reginald Pole, Cardinal in the Church of Rome
- Jeremy Sheehy, Anglican priest and academic
- William Tyndale, English reformer, linguistic genius, theologian
- Timothy Ware, monk and Bishop of the Eastern Orthodox Church (alias Kallistos Ware)
- Thomas Wolsey, Cardinal in the Church of Rome

== Academics ==
=== Economists ===
- Caroline Hoxby, American economist

=== Philosophers ===
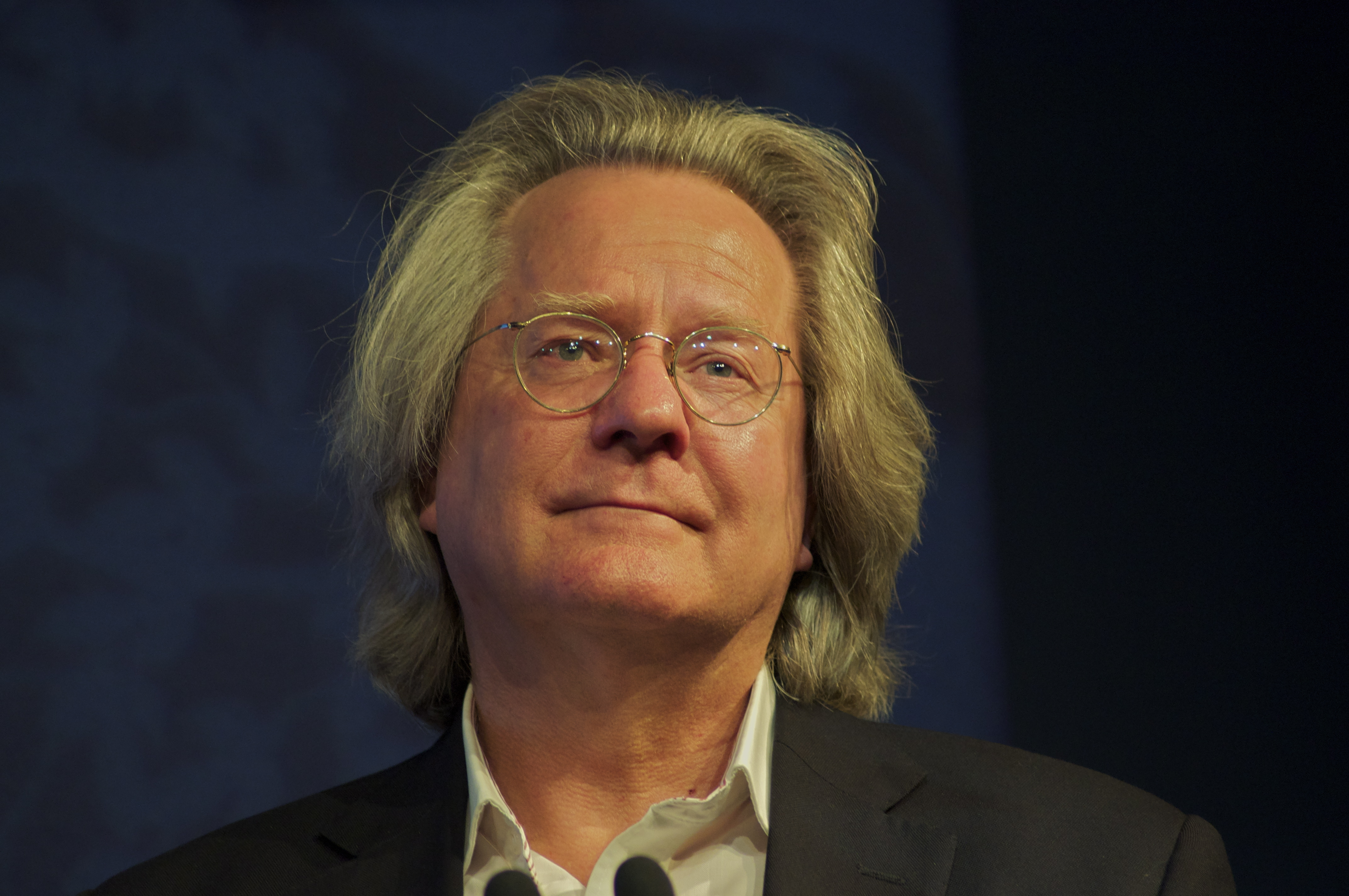
A. C. Grayling in 2011

- Ronald Dworkin, legal philosopher
- James Frederick Ferrier, metaphysical writer
- Edward Goldsmith, writer, environmentalist and philosopher
- A. C. Grayling, philosopher
- Peter Heylin, ecclesiastic and author of theological works
- Terence Irwin, philosopher
- Benedikt Isserlin, former Reader and Head of the Department of Semitic Studies at the University of Leeds
- Larry Siedentop, political philosopher

=== Historians and linguists ===
- Donald Adamson, author and historian
- Richard J. C. Atkinson, historian and archaeologist
- Robert Blake, Baron Blake, historian and life peer
- John Rouse Bloxam, historian and Fellow of Magdalen College, Oxford
- Thomas Sherrer Ross Boase, art historian, President of Magdalen College (1947–1968) and Vice-Chancellor of Oxford University (1958–1960)
- Derek Brewer, author and scholar, Master of Emmanuel College, Cambridge (1977–1990)
- Lionel Harry Butler, academic and Principal of Royal Holloway College, University of London (1973–1981)
- William Camden, antiquarian and historian
- Sir Neil Chalmers, former Director of the Natural History Museum London and Warden of Wadham College, Oxford
- Richard Chandler, antiquary
- William Cleaver, churchman and academic, Principal of Brasenose College, Oxford (1785–1809)
- Prof Edward Byles Cowell, translator of Persian poetry and the first Professor of Sanskrit at Cambridge University
- Norman Davies, historian
- Arthur Geoffrey Dickens, academic and author, Pro-Vice-Chancellor of the University of Hull (1959–1962)
- George Edmundson, clergyman and academic historian
- James Fenton, poet, journalist and literary critic
- Niall Ferguson, historian
- Felipe Fernández-Armesto, historian and author
- Theophilus Gale, educationalist, nonconformist and theologian of dissent
- Bernard Gardiner, Warden of All Souls College, Oxford and Vice-Chancellor of Oxford University (1712–1715)
- N. H. Gibbs, Chichele Professor of the History of War of Oxford University (1953–1977)
- Edward Gibbon, historian and Member of Parliament
- Martin Gilbert, historian
- Richard Gombrich, scholar of Sanskrit, Pāli, and Buddhist Studies, currently Founder-President of the Oxford Centre for Buddhist Studies
- Giles Henderson, Master of Pembroke College, Oxford
- R. L. Holdsworth, educationalist, cricketer and Himalayan mountaineer
- Albert Hourani, historian
- Reginald Johnston, academic, diplomat and tutor to Puyi
- Professor Anthony King, psephologist and political commentator
- Robin Lane Fox, classicist and gardener
- Francis Leighton, academic and Warden of All Souls College, Oxford (1858–1881)
- David Marquand, academic and former Labour Party MP
- David Thomas Powell, genealogist and antiquarian
- Hormuzd Rassam, native Assyriologist, British diplomat and traveller
- Adam Roberts, professor of international relations
- Charles Singer, historian of science, technology, and medicine
- John Steane, former headmaster, archaeologist, and author

== Mathematicians and scientists ==
Nobel laureates are identified

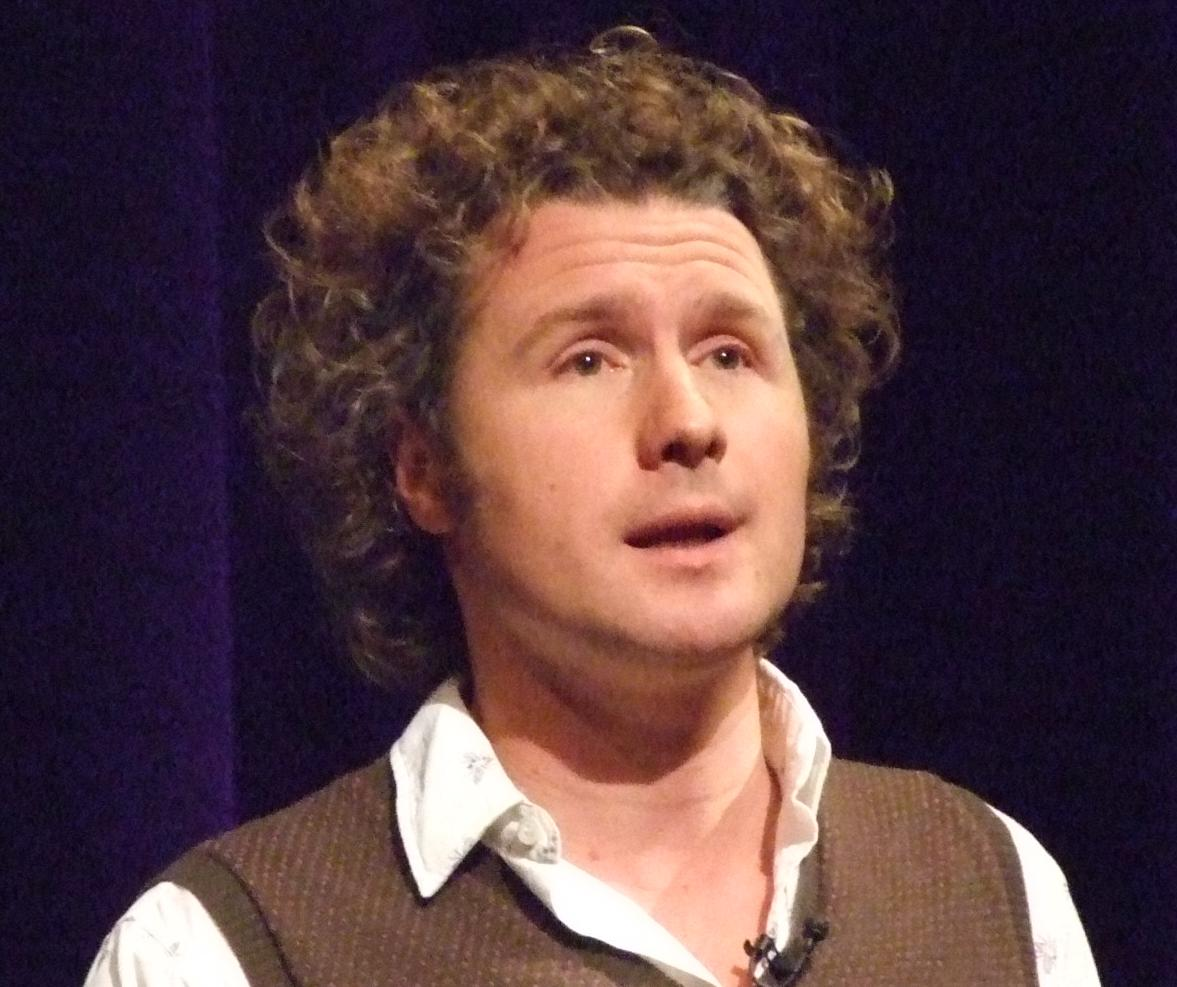
Ben Goldacre in 2009

- Paul Attfield, chemist and materials scientist
- John D. Barrow, cosmologist, theoretical physicist, and mathematician
- James Bateman, horticulturist
- H. A. Berlin, neuroscientist
- Humphry Bowen, chemist and botanist
- Henry Clerke, academic and physician, President of Magdalen College, Oxford, 1672–1687
- Frank Close, particle physicist, Professor of Physics at the University of Oxford
- William Henry Corfield
- Charles Daubeny, chemist, botanist and geologist
- Sir Gavin de Beer, evolutionary embryologist, Director of the British Museum of Natural History and President of the Linnean Society of London
- Robin Dunbar, anthropologist and evolutionary psychologist, currently Professor of Evolutionary Psychology at Oxford
- John Eccles, Nobel laureate (1963, Medicine)
- Sir John Bretland Farmer, botanist; Professor of Botany at Imperial College London
- James Fisher, author, editor, broadcaster, naturalist
- Howard Walter Florey, Nobel laureate (1945, Medicine)
- Ben Goldacre, physician, academic and science writer
- Jeffrey Alan Gray, psychologist
- John M. Goldman, haematologist, oncologist and medical researcher; pioneer in bone-marrow transplantation for chronic myeloid leukaemia; founding chairman of the charity Leuka
- Brian Greene, theoretical physicist and string theorist
- Frank Robinson Hartley, chemist, Vice Chancellor Cranfield University
- Geoffrey Herford, entomologist and civil servant
- Julian Jack, physiologist
- Francis Charles Robert Jourdain, amateur ornithologist and oologist
- Anthony James Leggett, physicist Nobel Laureate (2003, physics)
- Alfred Lodge, mathematician and President of the Mathematical Association
- Amory Lovins, American physicist, environmental scientist and writer
- Peter Medawar, Nobel laureate (1960, Medicine)
- Anna Louise Meredith, veterinary scientist, Pro Vice-Chancellor Keele University
- Desmond Morris, zoologist, ethologist and surrealist painter
- Gareth A. Morris, chemist
- Sheffield Airey Neave, naturalist and entomologist
- Matt Ridley, scientist, journalist, popular author, member of the House of Lords
- Sir Alexander Carr-Saunders, biologist and sociologist and later Director of the London School of Economics (1937–1957)
- A. Michael Spence, Nobel laureate (2001, Economics)
- Jon Stallworthy, professor emeritus of English at the University of Oxford
- Thomas William Webb, astronomer

== Athletes ==
- Mark Andrews, rower in the 1981 World Rowing Championships
- Harold Arkwright, cricketer
- Francis Barmby, cricketer
- Edgar Burgess, rower
- Charles Burnell, rower in the 1908 Summer Olympics
- John Carr, first-class cricketer
- Sir Christopher Chataway, former middle and long-distance runner, television news broadcaster, and Conservative politician
- Sir Collier Cudmore, lawyer, politician and Olympic rower who won the gold medal in the 1908 Summer Olympics
- Michael England, cricketer
- Philip Fleming, banker, rower, competed in the 1912 Summer Olympics
- Stanley Garton, rower, competed in the 1912 Summer Olympics
- Sir James Angus Gillan, Scottish rower and colonial service official; competed in the 1908 Summer Olympics and in the 1912 Summer Olympics
- Ewart Horsfall, rower (1912 Summer Olympics and 1920 Summer Olympics)
- Alister Kirby, rower at the 1912 Summer Olympics
- Sir Clement Courtenay Knollys, rower and Colonial Administrator and Governor
- David Laitt, cricketer
- Sir Henry Leveson Gower, England cricketer and Test Captain
- Alister Kirby, rower who competed in the 1912 Summer Olympics
- Duncan Mackinnon, rower in the 1908 Summer Olympics
- Gilchrist Maclagan, rower in the 1908 Summer Olympics
- Evelyn Montague, athlete and journalist; ran in the 1924 Paris Olympics, and is immortalized in the 1981 film Chariots of Fire
- Guy Nickalls, rower who competed in the 1908 Summer Olympics
- Guy Oliver Nickalls, son of Guy Nickalls, rower who competed in the 1920 Summer Olympics and in the 1928 Summer Olympics
- Malcolm Nokes, schoolteacher, soldier, research scientist and Olympic athlete (hammer throw and discus throw)
- Tuppy Owen-Smith, sportsman who played Test cricket for South Africa and captained England at Rugby Union
- Henry Wells, judge and coxswain at the 1912 Summer Olympics
- Leslie Wormald, rower in the Leander-eight in the 1912 Summer Olympics

== Artists and writers ==
- Donald Adamson, author and historian
- Julian Barnes, writer
- Neil Bartlett, author, theatre director
- Sir John Betjeman, poet, writer and broadcaster
- John Bensusan-Butt, landscape painter
- James Cahill, author and critic
- Christopher Derrick, author, reviewer, publisher's reader and lecturer
- Lord Alfred Douglas, author, poet and translator
- Fernanda Eberstadt, writer
- Duncan Fallowell, novelist, travel writer, memoirist
- John Florio, linguist and lexicographer
- Alan Garner, novelist
- John Gerrard, Legacy Fellow at Magdalen and artist
- Alan Hollinghurst, novelist and poet
- Pico Iyer, essayist and writer
- Girish Karnad, Indian writer and actor
- Gavin Lambert, screenwriter, novelist and biographer
- Andrew Lloyd Webber, Peer of the realm and music composer (did not graduate)
- John Lyly, writer, poet, dramatist, playwright and politician
- Robert Macfarlane, travel writer
- Compton Mackenzie, writer of fiction, biography, histories, and memoir
- Andrew McNeillie, currently Literature Editor at Oxford University Press
- Dave Morris, author of gamebooks, novels and comics
- Douglas Murray, author, writer and commentator
- Stephen Potts, author
- Benjamin Schwarz, writer
- Andrew Sullivan, author, editor, political commentator and blogger
- Wilfred Thesiger, explorer and travel writer
- Lucy Wadham, writer
- Oscar Wilde, Irish writer and poet
- George Wither, poet, pamphleteer and satirist

== Journalists ==
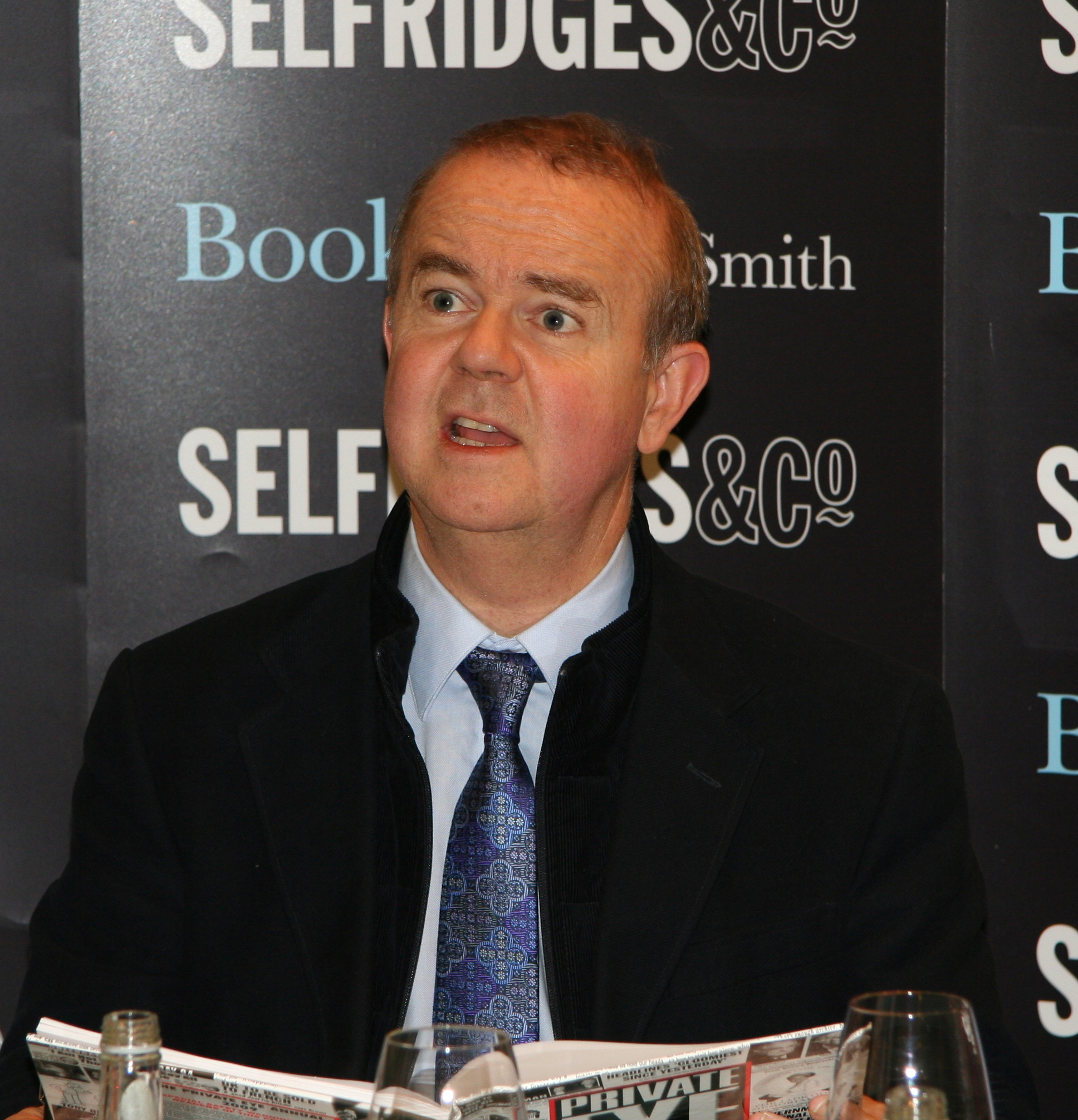
Ian Hislop in 2009

- Aravind Adiga, writer and journalist
- Swaminathan S. Anklesaria Aiyar, journalist and columnist
- Clive Crook, columnist for the Financial Times
- Matthew D'Ancona, journalist
- Geoffrey Dawson, editor of The Times (1912–1919 and 1923–1941)
- Bill Emmott, editor of The Economist (1993–2006)
- Ronan Farrow, investigative journalist
- Sagarika Ghose, journalist, news anchor and author
- Julia Hartley-Brewer, presenter of the weekday morning radio show on Talkradio
- Bevis Hillier, art historian, author and journalist
- Ian Hislop, editor Private Eye magazine and TV series Have I Got News for You team captain
- Paul Johnson, journalist, historian, speechwriter and author
- Robert Kee, broadcaster, journalist and writer
- Nicholas D. Kristof, journalist, author, op-ed columnist
- Donald McLachlan, Scottish journalist and author, founding editor of The Sunday Telegraph
- John Micklethwait, editor-in-chief of The Economist
- Peter Millar, journalist
- John Sergeant, journalist and TV personality
- Charles Spencer, 9th Earl Spencer, UK Peer, brother of Diana, Princess of Wales, journalist and broadcaster
- George Will, columnist, journalist and author

== Musicians ==
- Paul Agnew, operatic tenor
- John Mark Ainsley, lyric tenor
- Robin Blaze, countertenor
- Paul Brough, conductor and teacher
- Harry Christophers, conductor
- Vinicius de Moraes, poet, essayist, playwright and lyricist
- Anna Lapwood, organist, conductor and broadcaster
- David Lloyd-Jones, conductor
- Dudley Moore, actor, comedian, composer and musician
- Nicholas O'Neill, composer, arranger, organist and choral director
- Paul Sartin, oboist, violinist and singer with Bellowhead, and others
- James Whitbourn, composer and conductor

== Broadcasters and entertainers ==
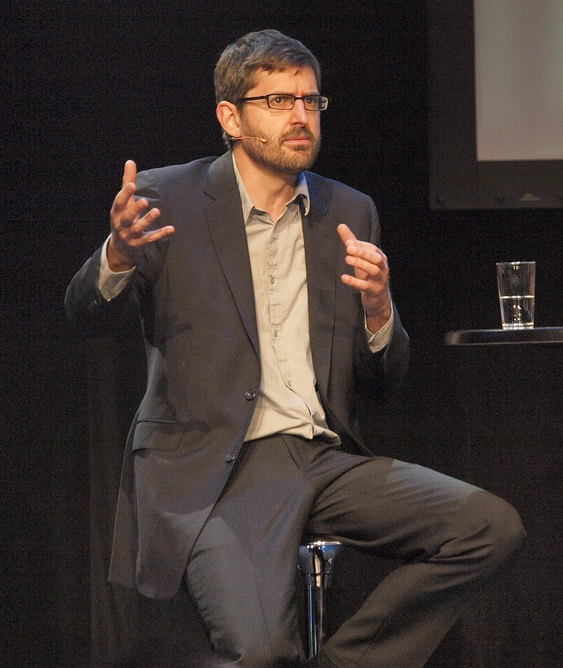
Louis Theroux in 2009

- Peter Brook, film and stage director
- Michael Denison, actor
- Freddie Grisewood, radio broadcaster
- Robert Hardy, actor
- Brian Inglis, journalist, historian and television presenter
- Terrence Malick, film director, screenwriter and producer
- Katie Mitchell, theatre director
- Wallace Shawn, actor
- Louis Theroux, broadcaster
- Simon Woods, actor

== Business ==
- David Abraham, Channel Four CEO
- Sir Eric Berthoud, oil man and diplomat
- Raymond Bonham Carter, banker; father of Helena Bonham Carter
- Sir Rupert Clarke, 3rd Baronet, soldier, businessman and horse rider
- Sir Vernon Ellis, Chair of the British Council
- Darius Guppy, British-Iranian businessman
- Dido Harding, CEO of TalkTalk
- Luke Johnson, businessman and Financial Times columnist
- J. Paul Getty, Anglo-American industrialist
- Charles D. Harman, banker and businessman
- Martha Lane Fox, Baroness Lane-Fox of Soho, co-founder of Lastminute.com and Peeress
- Prince Rupert Loewenstein, manager of the Rolling Stones
- Sir Humphrey Mackworth, industrialist and politician
- Clare Melford, former CEO of the International Business Leaders Forum
- Michael Montague, Baron Montague of Oxford, businessman and politician
- Pete Flint, founder of Trulia, Internet entrepreneur
- Sir Simon Robey, investment banker, co-founder of Robey Warshaw
- Laura Wade-Gery, Director of multi-channel e-commerce at Tesco and member of the British Government's Digital Advisory Board

== Other people ==
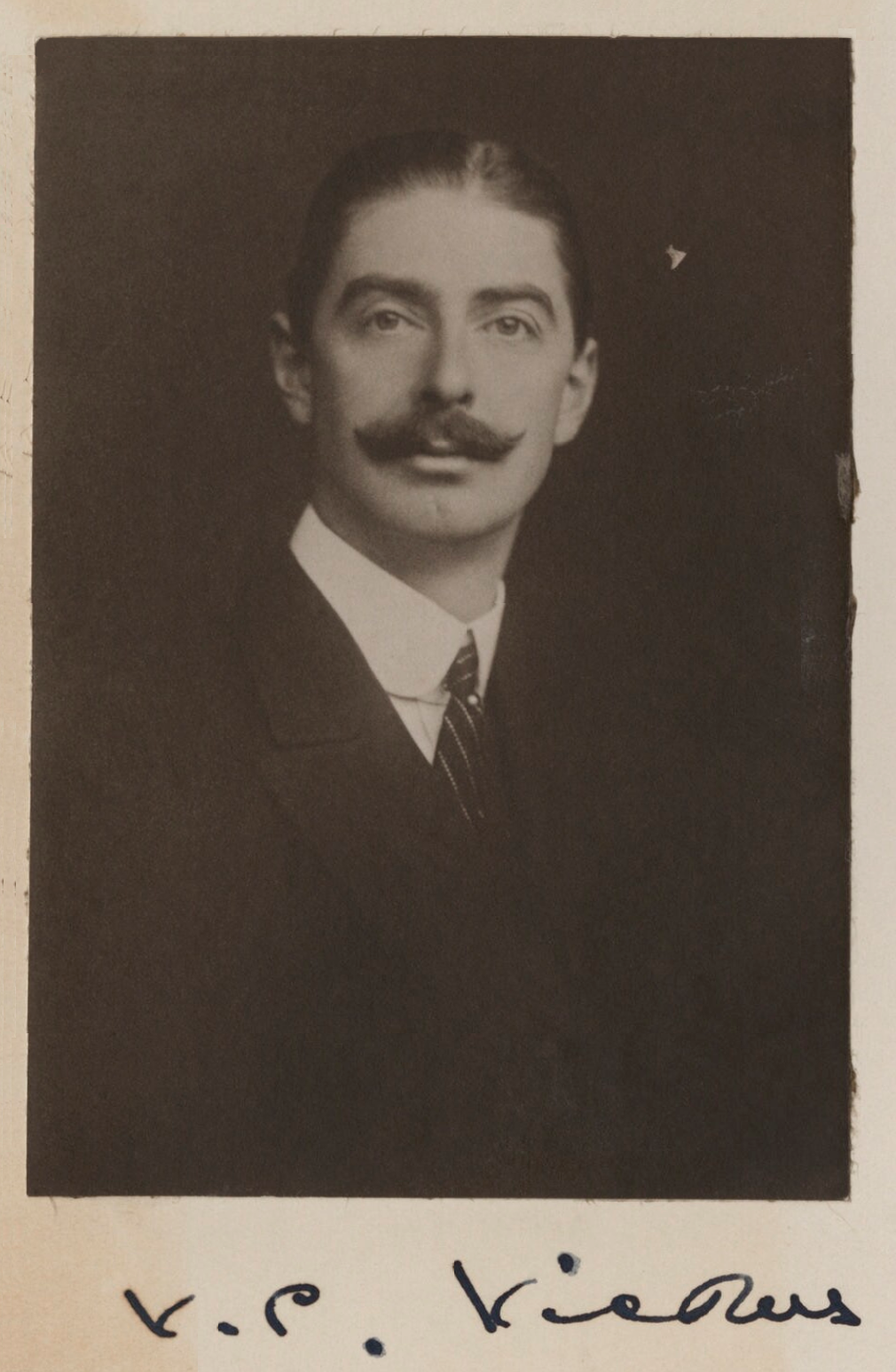
Portrait of Vincent Cartwright Vickers, platinum print, circa 1910.

- T. E. Lawrence (1888–1935), 'Lawrence of Arabia'
- Thomas Tudor Loveday (1875–1966), Principal of Southampton University College (1920–1922) and Vice-Chancellor of the University of Bristol (1922–1944)
- Simon Forman, Elizabethan astrologer, occultist and herbalist
- Robert Peverell Hichens, officer in the Royal Navy Volunteer Reserve
- Marc S. Ellenbogen, diplomat, philanthropist and President of the Prague Society for International Cooperation
- Vincent Cartwright Vickers, economist, humorist, artist, and Governor of the Bank of England.
- James Rebanks, author and sheep farmer.
- Wesley Clark, American Army general, Supreme Allied Commander Europe, and politician

== Fictional characters ==
- P. G. Wodehouse, in The Mating Season, attributes a Magdalen undergraduateship to his fictional literary character Bertie Wooster.
- Tibby, in E. M. Forster's Howards End, is also a Magdalen undergraduate.
- Bridey in Evelyn Waugh's Brideshead Revisited (Book 1, chapter 4).
- Nicholas Glozier in J.H. Fox's A Kentish Dream
- Bernard Woolley, the political adviser in Yes Minister and Yes Prime Minister.
