= Medlycott =

Medlycott is a surname. Notable people with the surname include:

- Adolph Medlycott (1838–1918), Indian Roman Catholic bishop
- Keith Medlycott (born 1965), English cricketer
- Thomas Medlycott (disambiguation), multiple people
