= Zaoui & Co. =

Investment bank based in London

Zaoui & Co. Ltd
- Type: Private
- Industry: Investment banking
- Founded: 2013; 13 years ago
- Headquarters: Mayfair, London, United Kingdom
- Key people: Michael Zaoui; Yoël Zaoui
- Website: zaouico.com

Zaoui & Co. is a boutique investment bank based in London. The firm was founded in 2013 and is led by brothers Michael and Yoël Zaoui.

The firm focus on advising companies in Europe regarding mergers and acquisition (M&A) matters.

== Background ==
Zaoui & Co. was founded in the fall of 2013 by Morocco-born brothers Michael and Yoël Zaoui. Both had significant experience in investment banking where Michael was previously the vice chairman of Morgan Stanley's institutional securities group as well as European M&A while Yoël was the co-head of global M&A at Goldman Sachs.

At the time there was a demand for smaller boutique investment banks from clients as they were able to provide more personalized services and did not have the same issues large banks had after the 2008 financial crisis. The brothers pitched to their clients that the firm would be able to provide one-on-one attention to their needs and the brothers would be personally working on the deals. As the firm only provides advice and does not earn fees in providing or managing capital, it was seen as more objective by some of its clients compared to its larger peers. In 2014, the firm had 10 employees and between January and mid-May of that year, Dealogic ranked the firm 15th in European M&A having advised on seven deals worth $67 billion.

In February 2021, Financial Times reported that Zaoui & Co. would appear as a top result in Google when users search for its boutique investment banking rivals such as Robey Warshaw, LionTree and Qatalyst Partners. Zaoui & Co. denied that it had engaged in cybersquatting and stated the only keyword search terms it owns include the name Zaoui.

In June 2021, Zaoui & Co. teamed up with several European executives to create Odyssey Acquisition, a special-purpose acquisition company, that would raise €300 million to invest in European healthcare and technology companies. Odyssey Acquisition was listed on Euronext Amsterdam and Zaoui & Co. would provide support to it in all stages of deal making. In December 2021, Odyssey Acquisition agreed to acquire BenevolentAI in a €1.5 billion deal that was the biggest in Europe at the time.

By 2021, Zaoui & Co. had advised on €225 billion worth of transactions. After it experienced a decline in profit of 72% to £2.4 million in 2021, in 2022 the firm had doubled its profit to £5.1 million and increased its number of employees to 17.

== Notable deals ==
- Advised L'Oréal to buy back 8% of its own shares from Nestlé in February 2014.
- Advised PSA Group on its restructuring plan in February 2014 which allowed Peugeot family to maintain a 14% stake
- Advised GlaxoSmithKline on a $20 billion asset swap with Novartis that was completed in March 2015
- Advised Alcatel-Lucent on its acquisition by Nokia for €15.6 billion in April 2015
- Advised Lafarge on its $50 billion merger with Holcim in July 2015.
- Advised PSA Group on its $50 billion merger with Fiat Chrysler Automobiles to form Stellantis in January 2021
- Advised SoftBank Group on the sale of Arm Holdings to Nvidia which fell through in February 2022
