= Reed's School =

Location
- Sandy Lane; Cobham, Surrey, KT11 2ES; England; 51.338253°N 0.375981°W

Information
- Type: Independent school Senior school Boarding and day school
- Motto: Fide (have faith)
- Religious affiliation: Church of England
- Established: 1813
- Founder: Andrew Reed
- Local authority: Surrey County Council
- Department for Education URN: 125321 Tables
- Chair of governors: Mike Wheeler
- Headmaster: Mark Hoskins
- Gender: Boys, with a co-educational sixth form
- Age: 11 to 18
- Enrolment: 700 (620 boys, 80 girls)
- Houses: Blathwayt, Bristowe, Capel & Mullens
- Colour: Navy
- Publication: Reedonian
- School fees: Annual fees 2022/23 up to: £34,920 (boarders); £26,985 (day pupils)
- Alumni: Old Reedonians
- Website: www.reeds.surrey.sch.uk

Reed's School is an independent secondary day and boarding school for boys with a co-educational sixth form located in Cobham, Surrey, England. There are currently around 700 day pupils (620 boys, 80 girls) and 100 full-time boarders (80 boys, 20 girls). The school was founded in 1813, by Andrew Reed and incorporated by an act of Parliament, the London Orphan Asylum Act 1845 (8 & 9 Vict. c. vii), under the presidency of the Archbishop of Canterbury, the Duke of Wellington and the Marquess of Salisbury. From 1951 until her death in 2022 Queen Elizabeth II acted as the school's 15th patron and visited the school twice, in 1997 and in 2014, as the reigning monarch. Alumni of the school are known as 'Old Reedonians'.

== History ==
=== Founding ===
Andrew Reed, founder of Reed's School

=== London Orphan Asylum, London (1813–1871) ===
The foundation was established to provide relief to destitute orphans, including children whose fathers had died and whose mothers were unable to provide for them. Initially the Asylum used two houses; one at Hackney Road, Shoreditch for the boys and one in Bethnal Green for the girls. The asylum's first unified site was at Lower Clapton Road, Clapton, where Newcome's School had stood.

Following the school's 1871 move to Watford, the East London buildings were used by the Salvation Army. Only the facade of the classical-style building remains, and forms part of the Clapton Girls' Academy

=== London Orphan Asylum/School, Watford (1871–1939) ===
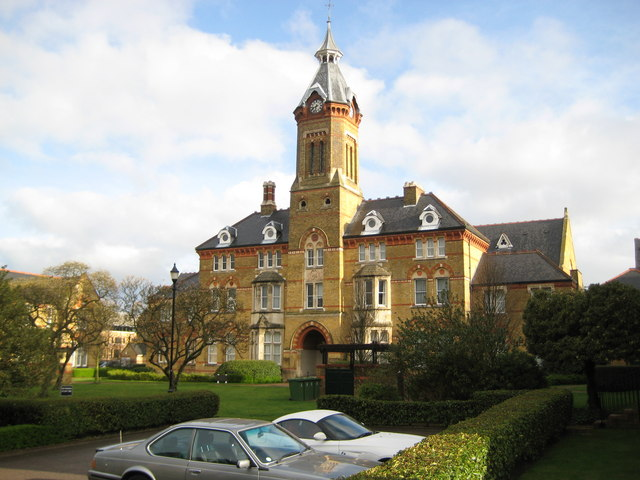
Former school buildings in Watford, now a residential development

A site in Watford was selected for the new school. The Prince of Wales, later Edward VII, and his wife the Princess of Wales and future Queen Alexandra, laid down the foundational stones on 15 July 1869 and the school formally opened in 1871.

The school was renamed to the "London Orphan School" in 1915, following a merge with the recently closed Royal British Orphan School in Slough it was again renamed the "London Orphan School and Royal British Orphan School", before finally being named "Reed's School" in 1939, in honour of the late founder.

In the early 1880s the London Orphan Asylum lost two football matches against the then named Watford Rovers, now known as Watford F.C.

Headmasters at the Watford site included Oliver Carter Cockrem and H.W. Russell.

In the 1980s the buildings were converted into residential accommodation.

=== Reed's School, Totnes and Towcester (1939–1945) ===
During World War II the school was evacuated from Watford. The site was used as an Army hospital and then by the Ministry of Labour.

=== Reed's School, Cobham (1945–present) ===
The Sandy Lane site had been purpose-built for the Sandyroyd School in around 1905 by architects Treadwell and Martin, who were also responsible for the design of Scott's restaurant (now part of the Trocadero Centre) and other notable structures. The new site provided facilities including a heated indoor swimming pool, a nine-hole golf course, and two squash courts.

A new headmaster, Robert Drayson, was appointed in 1955 and remained until 1964, when he migrated to Stowe.

In 1950, Reed's School began to take fee-paying pupils, while retaining its charitable element.

=== Royal Patrons since 1815 ===
The school has had many royal patrons.

- 1815 Prince Edward, Duke of Kent and Strathearn
- 1817 Prince Augustus Frederick, Duke of Sussex
- 1819 Princess Victoria of Saxe-Coburg-Saalfeld
- 1819 Leopold I of Belgium
- 1821 Ernest Augustus, King of Hanover
- 1822 Prince Frederick, Duke of York and Albany
- 1823 George IV
- 1826 Prince Adolphus, Duke of Cambridge
- 1826 William IV
- 1837 Queen Victoria
- 1843 Prince Albert of Saxe-Coburg and Gotha
- 1856 The Prince of Wales, later Edward VII
- 1870 The Princess of Wales, later Queen Alexandra
- 1910 George V
- 1936 George VI
- 1951–2022 Elizabeth II

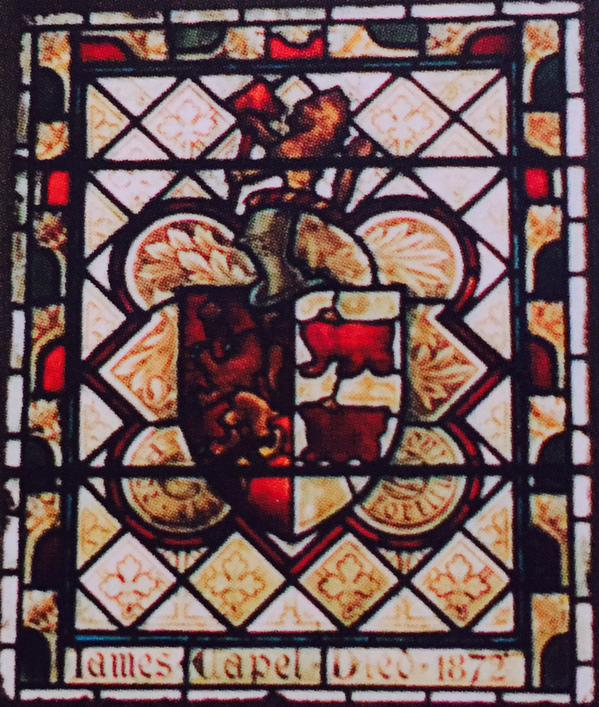
Stained glass commemorating James Capel in the Dining Hall, Watford

== Sports ==
The major sports at Reed's School are rugby, hockey and cricket with academies in tennis, skiing and golf. The senior pupils (13+) play rugby, hockey and cricket in the autumn, spring and summer terms respectively. Pupils in the junior school (11–13) play hockey, rugby and then cricket. The indoor tennis centre was opened by alumnus and former British number one, Tim Henman on 18 November 2014.

Reed's has won the International School Sport Federation's world schools' tennis championship more than any other team (in 2009, 2011 and 2015).

== Headmasters ==
- David Jarrett (1997–2014) – the first person to win a cricket blue for both Oxford and Cambridge
- Mark Hoskins (2014–present)

== Notable staff and associated people ==
- James Edmeston, architect and prolific hymn writer; wrote "Lead us, heavenly Father, lead us" for the children of the London Orphan Asylum
- Sir Benjamin Louis Cohen, former President of the London Orphan Asylum
- Sir William Blizard, consulting surgeon to the London Orphan Asylum
- Keith Medlycott, cricket coach
- Tom Hardy, actor

== Notable Old Reedonians ==
=== Royalty ===
- Prince Zeid Raad of Jordan, UN High Commissioner for Human Rights
- Prince Mired Raad of Jordan
- Timothy Taylor (art dealer), husband of Lady Helen Taylor

=== Business ===
- Alan Bott, founder of Pan Books
- Sir Simon Robey, banker and co-founder of Robey Warshaw

=== Literature ===
- Thomas Burke
- Richard Dinnick, screenwriter and author

=== Sport ===
- Henrik Breimyr, Norwegian professional football player
- Paul Brown-Bampoe, professional rugby union player
- Jeffrey Bruma, professional footballer, currently playing for PSV Eindhoven
- Alex Corbisiero, rugby player for Northampton Saints, England and the British and Irish Lions
- Jamie Delgado, British tennis player and coach
- Daniel Douthwaite, British cricketer for Glamorgan
- Jack Draper, British tennis player who recently placed in the semi finals of the US open
- Chris Eaton, British tennis player
- Alastair Gray, British tennis player
- Phil Salt, England cricketer
- Evan Hoyt, British tennis player
- Jack Gower, British alpine ski racer
- Tim Henman, British tennis player
- Oskar Kolk, cricketer
- James Morrison, golfer
- Luke Steyn, ski racer
- Theo Vukašinović, rugby player
- Jack Kenningham, rugby player

=== Arts/entertainment ===
- Richard Bagguley, muralist and artist
- Marcel Grant, filmmaker
- Dr. Keith Scholey, nature documentary producer
- Elvi Hale, actress
- Tom Hardy, actor
- Sir Simon Keenlyside, opera singer
- Sir Nolan, music producer and songwriter
- Shaun Scott, actor
- Renton Skinner, actor and comedian
- Toby Tarrant, radio DJ and son of Chris
- Jamie Treays, aka Jamie T, singer-songwriter

=== Politics ===
- Edward Kellett-Bowman, Conservative Member of the European Parliament

=== Law ===
- Stuart Popham, British lawyer
