= Luther Luedtke =

Luther S. Luedtke
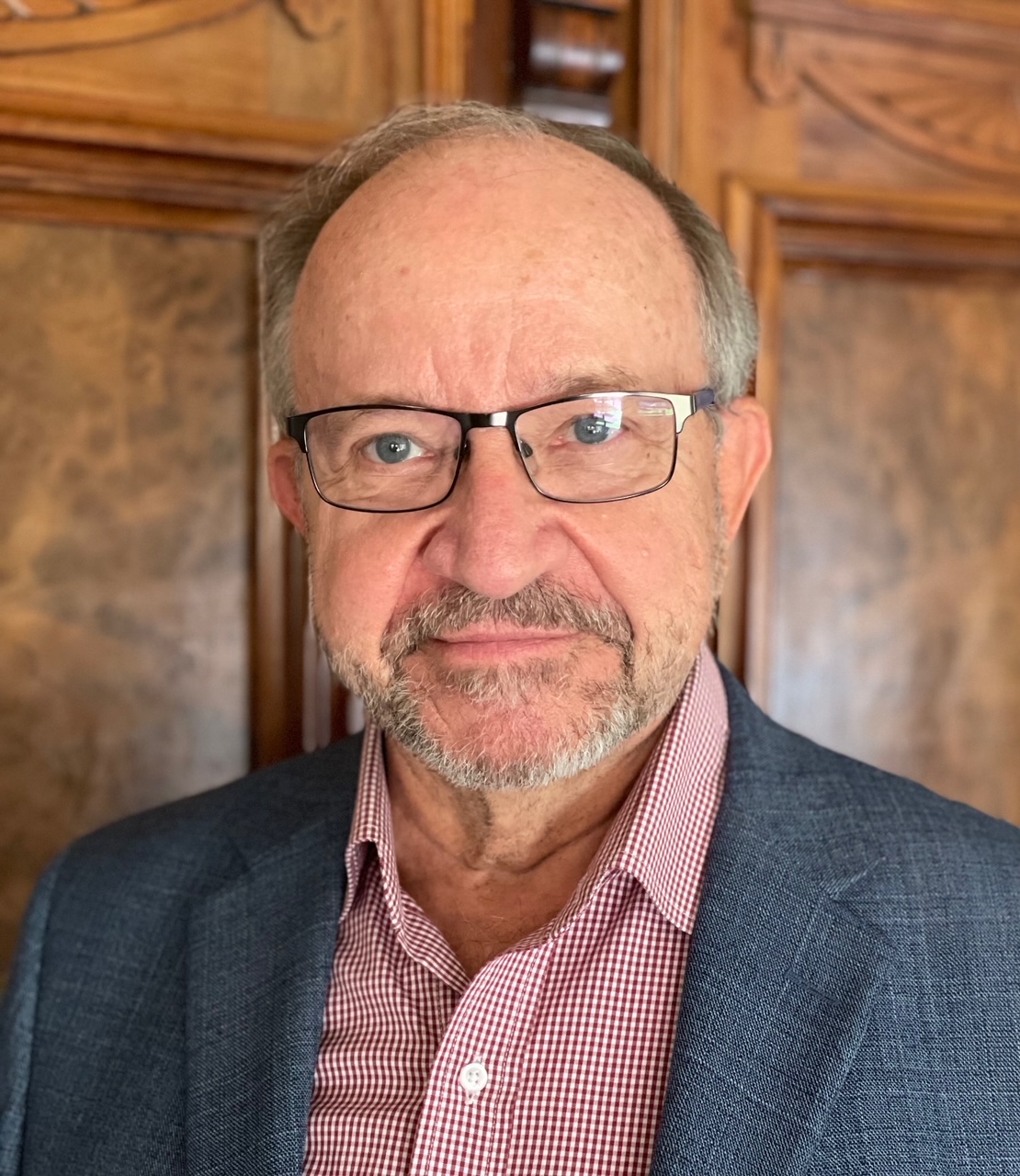

President of Education Development Center
- In office 2006–2015
- Preceded by: Janet Whitla
- Succeeded by: David Offensend

5th President of California Lutheran University
- In office 1992–2006
- Preceded by: Jerry H. Miller
- Succeeded by: John R. Sladek

Personal details
- Born: November 17, 1943 (age 81); Hutchinson, Minnesota, U.S.
- Spouse: Carol Lindstrom (m. 1967)
- Children: 2
- Education: Gustavus Adolphus College (BA); Brown University PhD

Luther S. Luedtke (born November 17, 1943) is an American scholar, educator, and non-profit executive who has served as president of Education Development Center (EDC), and California Lutheran University (CLU) in Thousand Oaks, California.

== Early life and education ==
Luedtke was born and raised on a Minnesota dairy farm and for six years attended a one-room country school. Valedictorian of his high school class, he attended Gustavus Adolphus College with a National Merit Scholarship graduating summa cum laude in English, German, and history in 1965. He received his Ph.D. in American Civilization Phi Beta Kappa from Brown University in 1971.

== Career ==
=== Teaching and research ===
From 1970 to 1992 Luedtke was a professor of English at the University of Southern California specializing in 19th and 20th century American literature. At various times he also directed USC's School of Journalism, American Studies Program, and graduate studies in English. Notable among his many publications is his book Nathaniel Hawthorne and the Romance of the Orient (1989), which was greeted as "the first genuinely original scholarship on Hawthorne's life and work that has appeared in almost a decade."

=== Public diplomacy ===
Beginning with a Fulbright grant and American Studies lectureship at the University of Kiel, Germany (1968-1969), Luedtke's teaching and research were weighted towards internationalism. His appointment as Resident Scholar for American Studies with the U.S. Information Agency (USIA) in Washington, D.C. (1979) launched more than a decade of lecturing and consultations for developing U.S. studies programs in Europe, Asia, and South America. This included an appointment as Distinguished Fulbright Scholar and Director of the American Studies Research Centre in Hyderabad, India (1984-1985). His book Making America: The Society and Culture of the United States (1987, revised 1992), originally commissioned by the Voice of America and prepared in collaboration with twenty-six other leading American scholars, was widely translated and became a leading text for students, journalists, and America watchers abroad as well as within the United States.

=== Non-profit leadership ===
Luedtke served as president of California Lutheran University from 1992 to 2006, the longest term of any president, a period of major growth in the university's undergraduate and graduate degree programs, enrollment, faculty, physical facilities, endowment, and national rankings. From 2006 until 2015, he was president and CEO of Education Development Center, a global non-profit headquartered in Newton, Massachusetts. At any time, EDC has some 1,500 research, design, and program staff in education, health, and workforce development working across the U.S. and more than twenty countries in Asia, Africa, Europe, the Middle East, and South America.

=== Boards and offices ===
Luedtke has chaired or served on the boards of numerous library, symphony, community service, philanthropic, professional, private equity, and financial service organizations including Thrivent Financial, American Studies Association, Ojai Music Festival, Jackson Memorial Library, Vesper Society, and Harvard Global Education Innovation Initiative.

== Personal life ==
He is married to Carol Luedtke, a former English teacher at Westridge School in Pasadena, California; they have two children.

== Selected publications ==
- Luedtke, Luther S. (1977). The study of American culture. DeLand, Fl: Everett, Edwards Press. ISBN 0-912112-28-X.
- Luedtke, Luther S. (1989). Nathaniel Hawthorne and the Romance of the Orient. Bloomington, Ind.: Indiana University Press. ISBN 978-0-253-33613-2.
- Luedtke, Luther S. (1992). Making America. Chapel Hill: University of North Carolina Press. ISBN 978-0-8078-4370-3.
