= LMM =

LMM may refer to:

- Large multimodal model, a large language model having multiple modalities.
- Los Mochis International Airport (IATA: LMM, ICAO: MMLM)
- Luis Muñoz Marín, first democratically elected governor of Puerto Rico
- Luis Muñoz Marín International Airport (IATA: SJU, ICAO: TJSJ), locally nicknamed LMMA or LMMIA
- Lightweight Multirole Missile, a product of Thales Air Defence Limited
- London Music Masters, charity that supports the involvement of young musicians in classical music
- Lucy Maud Montgomery (1874–1942), Canadian author
- Lin-Manuel Miranda, American composer, rapper, lyricist, and actor
- LIBOR market model, a financial model of interest rates
- Linear multistep method, schemes used in mathematics to find numerical solutions of ordinary differential equations
- Mixed model, also called linear mixed effects models (LMEMs), or shortened to linear mixed models (LMM)
