= Stuart Popham =

British lawyer

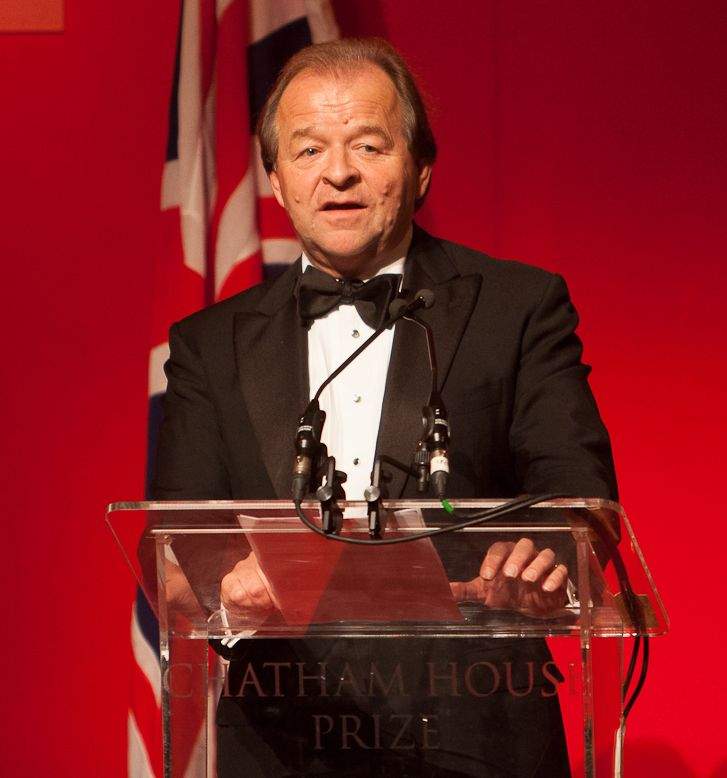
- Popham in 2012
- Born: Stuart Godfrey Popham; July 1954 (age 72)
- Education: University of Southampton
- Occupation: Lawyer
- Spouse: Carolyn Popham
- Children: 3

Stuart Godfrey Popham, CMG, KC (born July 1954) is a British lawyer.

A former senior partner at Clifford Chance, he is the vice chairman of EMEA Banking at Citigroup. He is a King's Counsel and the former chairman of Chatham House.

== Early life ==
Stuart Godfrey Popham was born in July 1954. He was educated at Reed's School, leaving in 1972. Subsequently, he received a law degree from the Southampton Law School at the University of Southampton, graduating in 1975.

== Career ==
Popham joined the law firm Clifford Chance in 1976. He was a partner from 1984 to 2003, and a senior partner from 2003 to 2011. He became a Queen's Counsel in 2011. He has served as the vice chairman of EMEA Banking at Citigroup since 1 July 2012.

Popham serves as the chairman of Chatham House. He also serves on the advisory council of TheCityUK. He was chairman of the board of trustees of the Royal National Lifeboat Institution until July 2022. He is also an independent governor of Birkbeck, University of London. He was awarded an honorary doctorate from the University of South Wales in 2013. With his wife, he is a donor to the Barbican Centre.

In February 2015, Popham argued that Brexit would make London less attractive to the financial services.

== Personal life ==
Popham resides in Chichester with his wife, Carolyn, and three children. He is a yachtsman.
