= Frank Quattrone =

American technology investment banker (born 1955)

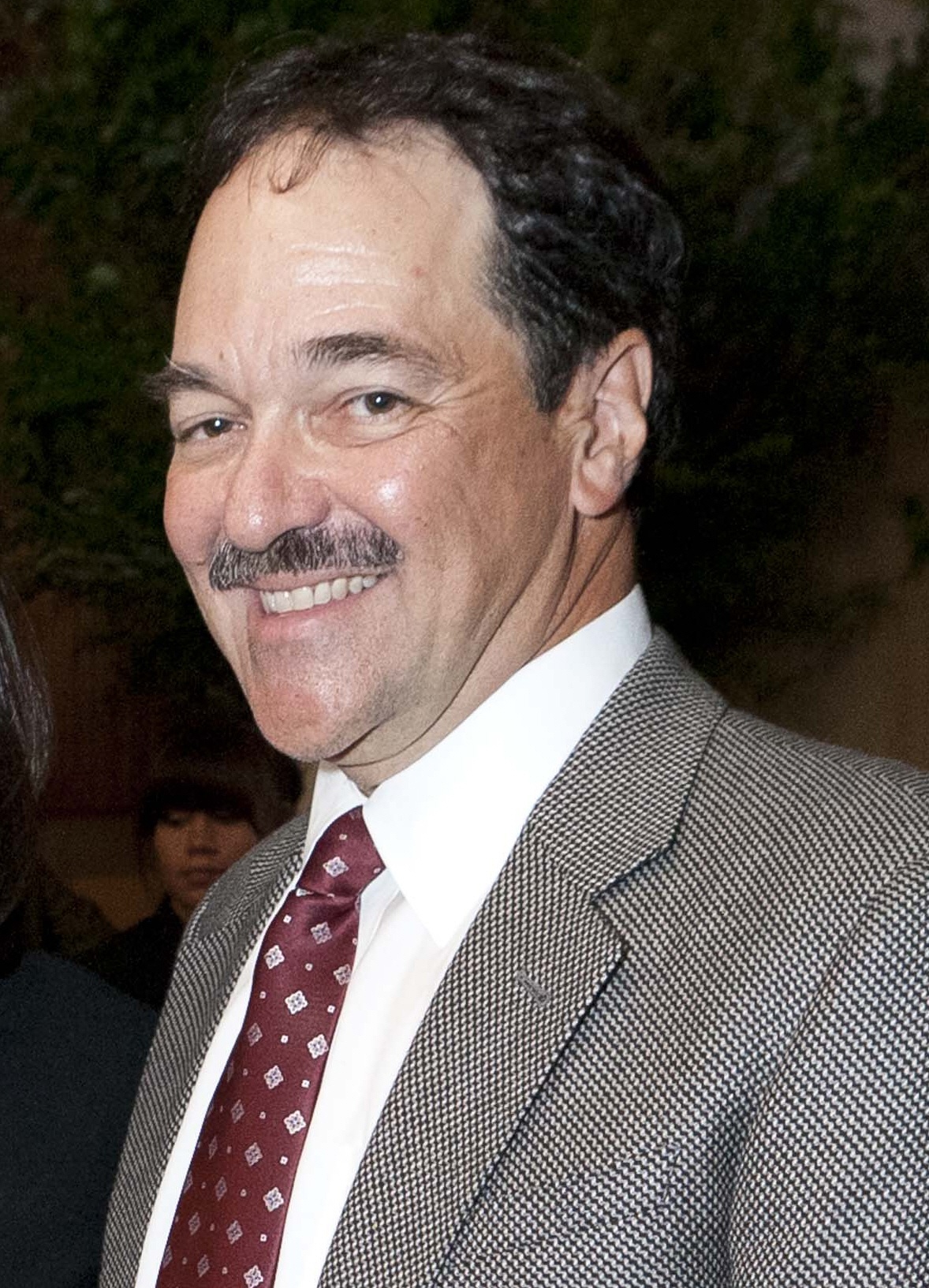
- Quattrone in 2011
- Born: 1955 (age 70–71); Philadelphia, PA
- Education: University of Pennsylvania; Stanford Graduate School of Business
- Occupation: Investment banker
- Spouse: Denise Foderaro

Frank Quattrone (born 1955) is an American investment banker who started technology sector franchises at Morgan Stanley, Deutsche Bank, and Credit Suisse First Boston. He helped bring dozens of technology companies public during the 1990s tech boom, including Netscape, Cisco, and Amazon.com. Later, he was prosecuted for interfering with a government probe into Credit Suisse First Boston's behavior in allocating "hot" IPOs. The case was eventually dropped. He was earning roughly $120 million a year during his peak at the firm. Quattrone is now head of investment banking firm Qatalyst Group, which he founded in March 2008.

== Life and career ==
Quattrone grew up in Philadelphia and attended St. Joseph's Preparatory School on an academic scholarship. He was admitted to the Wharton School of the University of Pennsylvania and graduated with honors. Following business school at Stanford University, he began work at Morgan Stanley's technology investment banking group.

In 2003, Quattrone was confronted with evidence of allegedly incriminating emails in a widely publicized series of trials. Some of the evidence included Quattrone forwarding to his entire staff an email with the subject 'Re: Time to clean up those files' after being told Credit Suisse First Boston was under investigation by a grand jury. The first trial resulted in a hung jury. The second trial resulted in a conviction. On appeal the U.S. Court of Appeals for the Second Circuit reversed Quattrone's conviction, ruling, based in part upon the Supreme Court case Arthur Andersen LLP v. United States that Quattrone's jury had been given erroneous jury instructions. The appeals court also agreed with the defense that in the interest of justice, subsequent proceedings should take place in front of a different judge.

On August 22, 2006, Quattrone reached a deferred prosecution agreement, which allowed him to avoid prison time, "leading legal observers to label the agreement an exoneration." The National Association of Securities Dealers also dropped their charges. It was stated that he "plan[s] to resume [his] business career." According to reports, Mr. Quattrone would receive $100 million to $550 million in overdue compensation, so long as he would abide by an agreement and would not break the law for a year. Credit Suisse had paid for Quattrone's legal costs.

Since 2004, Frank Quattrone and his wife Denise have supported the Northern California Innocence Project (NCIP) based at Santa Clara University School of Law. Quattrone is Chair of the NCIP Advisory Board and an active fund-raiser for the project. At the NCIP inaugural Justice for All Awards Dinner in March 2008, Quattrone accepted the Leadership Award. In 2013, the Frank and Denise Quattrone Foundation made a $15 million gift to the University of Pennsylvania Law School to found the Quattrone Center for the Fair Administration of Justice, a research center conducting inter-disciplinary, data-driven policy level research and recommendations designed to address the system factors that lead to criminal justice error.

== Qatalyst Group ==
In March 2008, Quattrone founded Qatalyst Group, a high-end corporate advisory firm focused on technology. Almost immediately after the firm issued its founding press release, it was reported to be advising Google on the Yahoo takeover deal pending with Microsoft.

Qatalyst has since advised on some of the most high-profile assignments in the industry. It represented Data Domain on its sale to EMC, nearly doubling the firm's purchase price, and represented struggling mobile device maker Palm in its sale to Hewlett-Packard.

The success of Data Domain sale was followed by the bidding war for 3Par, which concluded in Hewlett Packard paying more than double the 3Par's value on the public markets. Netezza (on its sale to IBM) and Isilon (on its sale to EMC) were other storage clients advised by Qatalyst in 2010.

The success of 2010 was overshadowed by Qatalyst's assignments in 2011. Qatalyst advised Riot Games on its sale to Tencent, Kosmix on its sale to Walmart, Atheros on its sale to Qualcomm, Zong on its sale to eBay, PopCap on its sale to EA, National Semiconductor on its sale to Texas Instruments, Autonomy on its sale to Hewlett Packard, Motorola Mobility on its sale to Google, and Netlogic on its sale to Broadcom, among many others.
