= Evercore =

American financial services company

Evercore Inc.

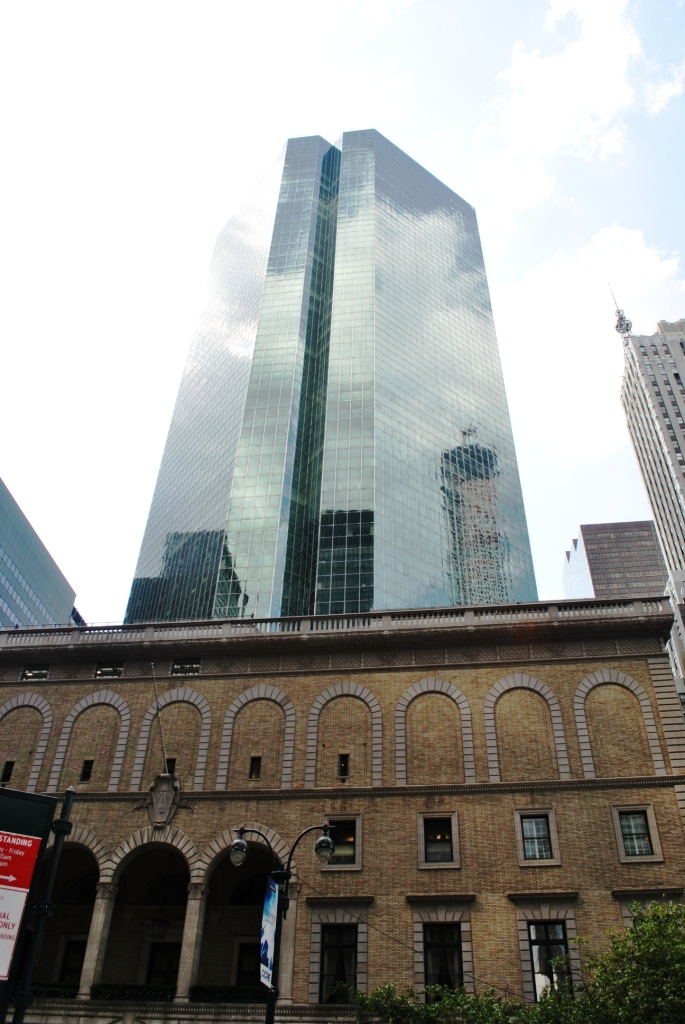
- Headquarters at Park Avenue Plaza
- Formerly: Evercore Partners Inc. (1995–2017)
- Type: Public
- Traded as: NYSE: EVR (Class A); S&P 400 component
- Industry: Investment banking
- Founded: 1995; 31 years ago
- Founder: Roger Altman
- Headquarters: New York City, United States
- Key people: Roger Altman (Senior Chairman); John S. Weinberg (Chairman and CEO); Ralph Schlosstein (Chairman Emeritus)
- Products: Investment banking; Investment management; Equity research
- Revenue: ▲US$3.86 billion (2025)
- Operating income: ▲US$790 million (2025)
- Net income: ▲US$592 million (2025)
- AUM: ▲US$15.5 billion (2025)
- Total assets: ▲US$5.36 billion (2025)
- Total equity: ▲US$2.03 billion (2025)
- Number of employees: 2,570 (2025)
- Website: evercore.com

Evercore Inc., formerly known as Evercore Partners, is a global independent investment banking advisory firm founded in 1995 by Roger Altman, David Offensend, and Austin Beutner. The firm has advised on over $4.7 trillion of merger, acquisition, and restructuring transactions since its founding.

Evercore advises on mergers and acquisitions, divestitures, restructurings, financings, public offerings, private placements and other strategic transactions and provides institutional investors with macro and fundamental equity research, sales and trading execution. It offers wealth management, institutional asset management and private equity investing.

Evercore is headquartered in New York City and has 28 offices in 11 countries across North America, Europe, South America and Asia, with approximately 1,950 employees.

== History ==
=== Founding and establishment ===
Evercore Partners was founded by Roger Altman in 1995, on the basis that clients would be best served by an investment banking firm free of the conflicts of interest of large financial institutions like Goldman Sachs and Merrill Lynch

Altman began his career in investment banking at Lehman Brothers, serving as general partner until 1977. After a role as assistant secretary of the U.S. Treasury until 1981, Altman returned to Lehman as co-head of investment banking.

In 1987, Altman joined The Blackstone Group as its head of advisory business before returning to the U.S. Treasury to serve as deputy secretary in 1993.

In 1995, Altman founded Evercore Partners.

== Recent activities ==
- In 2009, Evercore advised Wyeth in the largest deal of the year. In 2010 the firm advised Genzyme in the largest healthcare deal of the year.
- In August 2011, the firm completed its acquisition of Lexicon Partners, an independent UK-based investment banking advisory firm.
- In October 2011, Evercore and Kotak Mahindra Capital Company Limited ("Kotak Investment Banking") (a subsidiary of Kotak Mahindra Bank Limited), announced that the two firms had entered into an exclusive strategic alliance for cross-border M&A advisory services between India and the United States, the United Kingdom, and Mexico.
- In November 2011, the firm announced that it had agreed to purchase a 5% non-controlling interest in ABS Investment Management, an institutionally focused equity long/short hedge fund of funds manager.
- In 2012, Evercore advised Kraft in the largest Consumer/Retail deal of the year, as well as TNK-BP in the largest Energy deal of the year.
- In 2023, Evercore advised Dell in the largest technology deal of the year.
- In April 2014, former Evercore banker Perkins Hixon pleaded guilty to insider trading in the securities of Evercore, Westway Group Inc. and Titanium Metals Corporation from 2010 to 2013. He resigned from the company earlier in 2014.
- In August 2014, Evercore announced the acquisition of International Strategy & Investment ("ISI") Group for $440 million. The deal was closed the following October to create Evercore ISI Institutional Equities, offering Macro and Fundamental Research, Sales, and Trading execution. In 2014, the firm secured the second highest number of Institutional Investor #1 positions, after J.P. Morgan, and also ranked No. 5 in total II positions. The same year, Evercore advised AstraZeneca in its defense against Pfizer's hostile takeover.
- Other M&A assignments include advising DuPont on its $68 billion merger of equals with The Dow Chemical Company to create DowDuPont; Medivation on its sale to Pfizer Inc., and Abbott Laboratories on its $31 billion acquisition of St. Jude Medical in the two largest Healthcare transactions of 2016. In addition, the company advised Qualcomm on its pending acquisition of NXP Semiconductors NV in the largest Technology transaction of that year. Evercore also advised Centurylink on its pending acquisition of Level 3 Communications Inc. in the largest Telecom transaction of 2016, and Tesla, Inc. on its $2 billion acquisition of SolarCity.
- Also in 2016, John S. Weinberg joined Evercore from Goldman Sachs as Chairman of the Board and Executive Chairman.
- In 2017, Evercore advised Coach, Inc. on its $2 billion acquisition of Kate Spade New York; Whole Foods Market on its $14 billion sale to Amazon; CVS on its acquisition of Aetna in the largest Healthcare deal of the year; and Qualcomm on its successful defense against Broadcom in the largest contested Technology deal ever.
- In 2018, Evercore has advised the Independent Committee of the Board of Directors of T-Mobile U.S. on its $25.6 billion acquisition of Sprint Corporation, Takeda Pharmaceutical Company Limited on its $62.2 billion acquisition of Shire plc, and Comcast Corporation on its $39 billion acquisition of Sky plc.
- In 2019, Evercore advised National Amusements, Inc. on its $12 billion combination of CBS Corp. and Viacom Inc., Anadarko Petroleum on its $55 billion sale to Occidental Petroleum, and Bristol-Myers Squibb on its $74 billion acquisition of Celgene Corporation in the largest M&A deal of the year.
- In 2020, Evercore advised AstraZeneca on its $39 billion acquisition of Alexion Pharmaceuticals in the largest healthcare M&A deal of the year.
- In July 2025, Evercore acquired Robey Warshaw in a cash and share deal that valued the company at £146 million.
- In October 2026, Evercore named Nigel Dawn and Naveen Nataraj as co-presidents, effective January 1, 2027.
- In November 2026, Francis Stapleton left Evercore for Bank of America, where he became head of its global activism and raid-defense team.

== See also ==
- Investment banking
- List of investment banks
- Boutique investment bank
