= Robert Drayson =

English naval officer and schoolmaster (1919-2008)

Robert Quested Drayson DSC (5 June 1919 – 15 October 2008) was an English naval officer and schoolmaster.

During the Second World War Drayson was decorated for sinking the German Navy auxiliary cruiser Komet. After the War he returned to Cambridge, graduated, and taught at St. Lawrence College and Felsted, then was head master of Reed's School and Stowe before becoming lay chaplain to the Bishop of Norwich.

== Life ==
Born in Ramsgate, Kent, Drayson was educated at Chatham House School, St. Lawrence College, Ramsgate, and Downing College, Cambridge, arriving there in 1938 to read Modern Languages. At school he excelled at field hockey, cricket and middle-distance running.

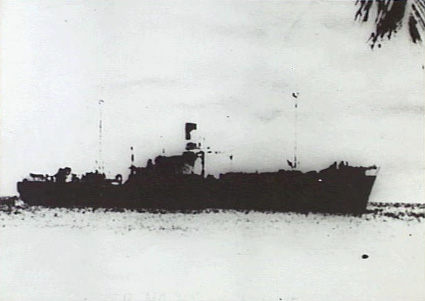
The auxiliary cruiser Komet

The Second World War broke out when Drayson had been at Cambridge for a year. He joined the Royal Navy as a rating, but was sent to take an officer training course at the newly established HMS King Alfred, then at Hove. After joining the fleet he spent the whole war serving in the motor torpedo boats of the home coastal forces.

In October 1942, Drayson was the first lieutenant on MTB 236. His commanding officer had gone sick, so Drayson, with the rank of Acting Sub-Lieutenant, had temporary command of the boat when the flotilla was included in a force of MTBs and destroyers in an action off the French coast. The German auxiliary cruiser Komet, escorted by some torpedo boats, was passing through the English Channel to start her second commerce raiding cruise. The Allied force headed at speed for an interception point near Cap de la Hague. 2 MTB flotillas were following 5 destroyers.

Drayson was in the second flotilla and, as junior commanding officer, last in the line of MTBs as they crossed the Channel. In the very dark night of 13 October, the leading flotilla lost contact with the destroyers and then Drayson became separated from the rest of the MTBs as they halted for the flotilla commanders to discuss what they should do. He decided to continue independently directly to Cap de la Hague. He soon saw signs of an intense battle start between the Allied destroyers and the German convoy: star shells and tracer fire illuminated the scene. He decided to get to the shoreward side of the battle, hoping to find a target trying to escape the action.

Instead, he saw Komet, the main target, silhouetted by a starshell. MTB 236 was ahead of the German ship and moved in to attack at slow speed. Komet was heavily engaged with the destroyers, firing astern and travelling at about 15 knots. Drayson fired his two torpedoes at a range of about 500 yards and turned away, crash starting the main engines and making smoke to provide some cover. Komet switched her fire to the MTB, but both torpedoes hit just as this was becoming accurate. Moments later, there was an enormous secondary explosion as Komet blew up and sank with all hands. The stern of MTB 236 was lifted out of the water by the explosion and the concussion put one engine out of action and damaged another. She limped home at reduced speed. Drayson was awarded the Distinguished Service Cross for "great skill and bravery" and went on to command MTB 701.

In 1943 Drayson married Rachel Jenkyns, a WREN, and they had a son and two daughters.

In 1946, soon after leaving the Royal Navy, Drayson returned to Cambridge, where he gained a Blue for hockey and took a degree in history. After Cambridge, he became an assistant master at St. Lawrence College, his old school. From there he went to Felsted School as an assistant house master and in 1955 was appointed as head master of Reed's School, Cobham, Surrey. In 1964 he moved up to the headmastership of Stowe School, where he remained for fifteen years. In its obituary of him, The Daily Telegraph called Drayson the "head master of Stowe whose muscular Christianity and tireless persistence revived the school's fortunes".

One of Drayson's boys at Stowe was Richard Branson, who later confessed that while at the school "In a lengthy report, I instructed the then headmaster, R. Q. Drayson, in no uncertain terms just how I felt he should have been running the school. I covered many areas... Boldly, I said money would be saved by my plan and this could be put towards my next proposals." When the 16-year-old Branson left Stowe, Drayson told him, "Congratulations, Branson – I predict you will either go to prison or become a millionaire."

Always a committed Christian, after retiring from Stowe in 1979, Drayson spent some five years as lay chaplain to his wartime colleague Maurice Wood, Bishop of Norwich, and spent six years as a member of the board of governors of Wood's former school, Monkton Combe School, from 1979 to 1985. The Draysons settled at Sandhurst, Kent where he took an active part in village life until his death on 15 October 2008 at the age of 89.
