= Financial Technology Partners =

American investment banking firm

- Type: Private
- Industry: Investment banking
- Founded: 2002; 24 years ago
- Founder: Steve McLaughlin
- Headquarters: San Francisco, California, U.S.
- Key people: Steve McLaughlin
- Number of employees: ~250 (2023)
- Website: www.ftpartners.com

Financial Technology Partners (FT Partners) is an American boutique investment bank which focuses on the fintech sector.

It is headquartered in San Francisco with additional offices in New York, Miami and London.

== History ==
In 2002, Steve McLaughlin who was Global head of Financial Technology investment banking at Goldman Sachs left his job to found FT Partner from his apartment in Pacific Heights, San Francisco.

FT Partners focused on fintech which at the time was still in its infancy. According to McLaughlin, the financial institution bankers did not like fintech as the deals were too small while the technology bankers did not like fintech as the deals were weird. When the firm was launched, McLaughlin was helped by unpaid interns from University of California, Berkeley to buy office supplies from a Staples store. After the Dot-com bubble, the firm for a while had to struggle to find any deals.

An early deal that made the firm notable was for Lynk Systems Inc. It previously hired Merrill Lynch to find a buyer and got an offer of $150 million. It offered FT Partners 5% of any deal price over $300 million. In 2004, the company was sold to Royal Bank of Scotland for $525 million. After the sale, FT Partners commissioned and framed a cartoon commemorating the deal with plans to present it at a celebratory dinner in New York. McLaughlin went to a printing shop and offered $1,000 to produce a poster-sized version.

Another notable deal was where FT Partners stood out was when it advised Verifone on its initial public offering (IPO) in April 2005. While the company hired bulge bracket investment banks to be bookrunners or co-managers for it, FT Partners was hired as the IPO adviser to perform most of the other work on the deal such as drafting regulatory filings, working on valuation and picking the underwriters. It was speculated that FT Partners was chosen because its independent nature allowed it to get better valuation for VeriFone compared to the larger investment banks who might underprice the new offering to please their investor clients. In addition FT Partners as a single IPO adviser was able to keep VeriFone's intention secret until it was ready to market the deal which was more difficult with the traditional underwriting route as it involved multiple parties. FT Partners took an advisory fee of $1.25 million which was paid in VeriFone shares valued at the offering price of $10 each that FT Partners could not sell for six months. It was hoped that the share price would appreciate in the future which would increase the firm's payout even more.

In December 2021, FT Partners had 225 employees and made $600 million in revenue that year giving it a valuation of $2 billion. The firm is wholly owned by McLaughlin who stated he has no intention to sell it or take it public.

== Business overview ==
FT partners business model combines investment banking advisory services with the profit seeking of private equity which results in fees that often ratchet up as a percentage of the sales price it fetches for clients. The fees charged by FT partners are considered brazen for their size and structure even by Wall Street standards. The blueprint of FT partners is to find companies that are not properly valued, negotiate unusual fee structures and only represent the sellers. In 2019, the firm earned a $250 million fee on the sale of a client which according to Dealogic is the biggest advisory fee on record. McLaughlin also personally invests in the companies that he advises. This has led to concern about a conflict of interest but McLaughlin has stated personally investing in his client will align his incentives with theirs. McLaughlin has also stated that the firm generally has no interest in working on large deals worth over $20 billion for large clients as the firm is focused on being small, nimble and specialized.

FT Partners grew slowly in its early years, as attracting talent was difficult for a small, unknown firm. McLaughlin was the firm's only managing director for its first decade and handled all transactions personally. The firm has only recently begun hiring additional senior bankers. Despite the firm's expansion, McLaughlin remains involved in each deal. After hiring several senior bankers with fintech expertise, the firm has operated without actively soliciting clients for over a decade. It receives hundreds of monthly inquiries from fintech companies but accepts only a limited number of new clients, stating that it prioritizes dedicated attention to each engagement.

== Notable deals ==
- Advised Tradescape on its sale to E-Trade in April 2002 for $280 million.
- Advised SoundView Technology Group on its sale to Charles Schwab in November 2003 for $321 million.
- Advised Mercury Payment Systems on its acquisition by Vantiv in May 2014.
- Advised Heartland Payment Systems on its $4.5 billion acquisition by Global Payments in April 2016.
- Advised CardConnect on its sale to First Data for $750 million in May 2017. The fee charged struck First Data executives as so egregious that they asked CardConnect to get it reduced.
- Advised Cayan on its acquisition by TSYS for $1 billion in January 2018.
- Advised GreenSky on its IPO in May 2018.
- Advised the sale of Assurance IQ to Prudential Financial for $2.35 billion in September 2019. Assurance IQ was a three-year-old startup with no venture capital funding.
- Helped arrange a funding round for Revolut in July 2021 that increased its valuation from $5.5 billion to $33 billion.
- Advised Circle on its merger with a special-purpose acquisition company called Concord Acquisition Corp in July 2021. It was a $4.5 billion deal to become a public company. There was a dispute on the fee as FT partners stated they were entitled to around 9% of the transaction value which was more than $400 million.
