= Petersham Lodge =

Coordinates: 51.446858°N 0.304261°W

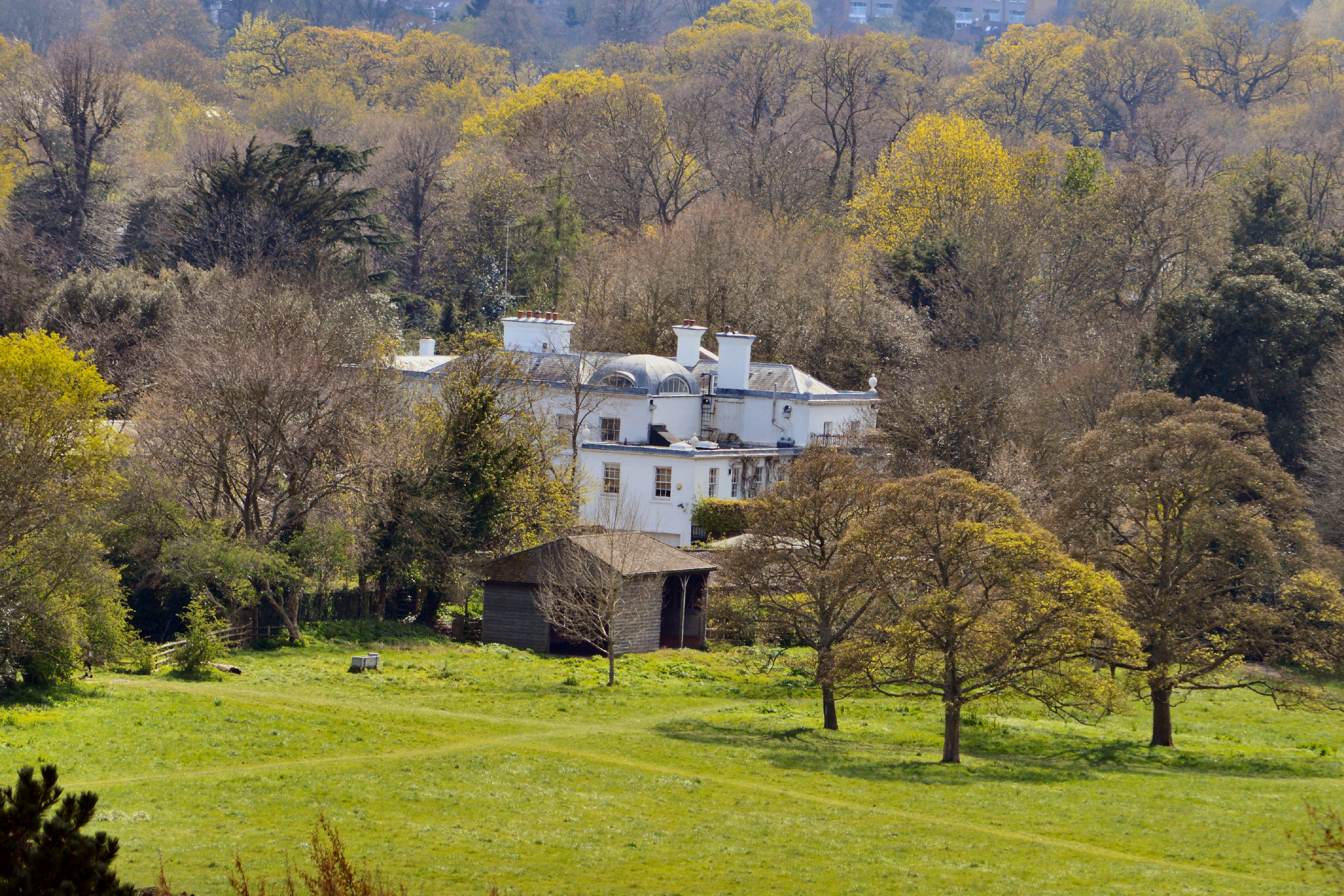
- Petersham Lodge from Richmond Hill
- Interactive map of the Petersham Lodge area

General information
- Type: Residential
- Location: Petersham, London Borough of Richmond upon Thames, England
- Construction started: early 18th century

Listed Building – Grade II
- Official name: Petersham Lodge
- Designated: 10 January 1950
- Reference no.: 1250211

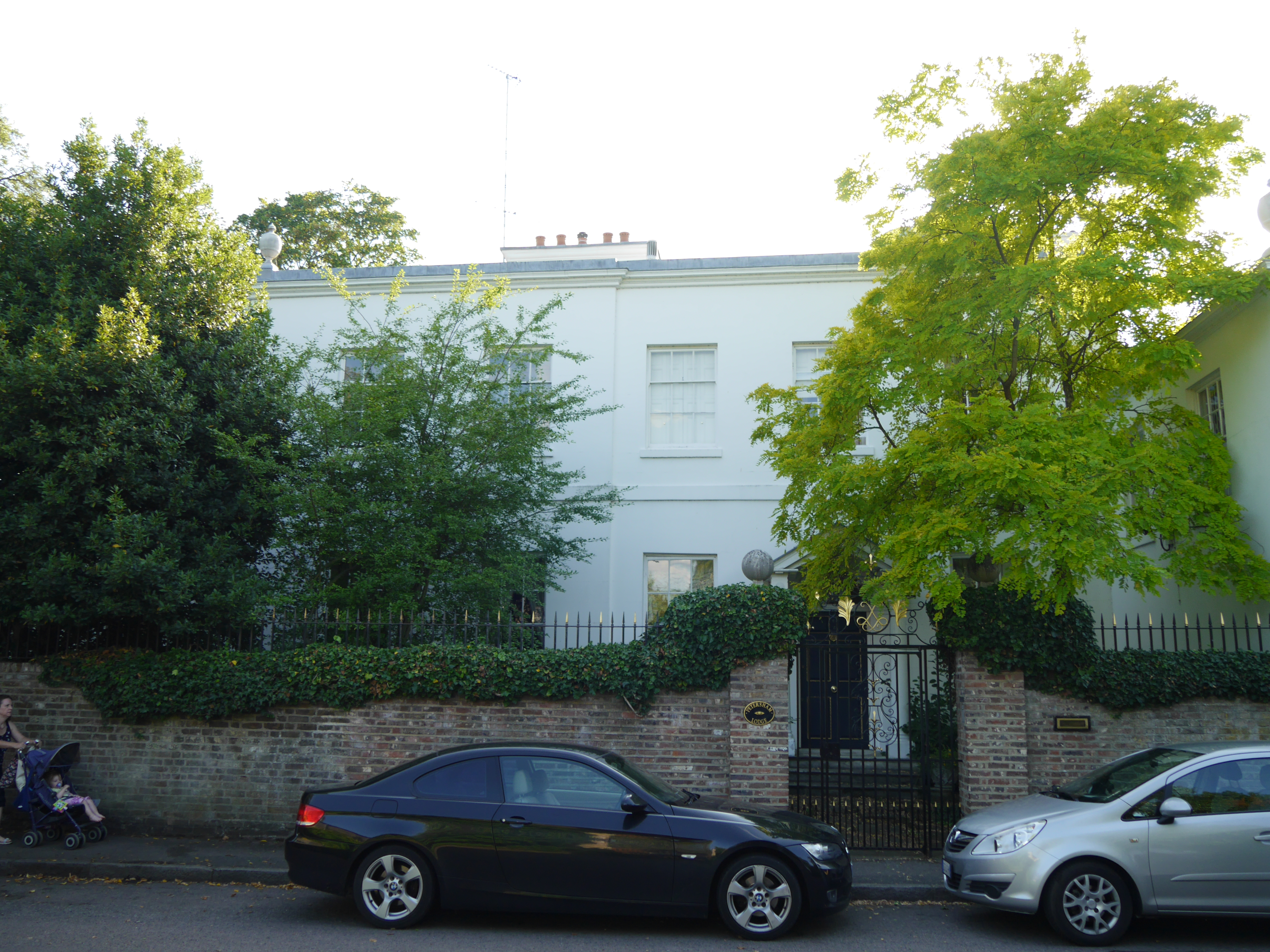
Petersham Lodge

Petersham Lodge is a Grade II listed house on River Lane, Petersham in the London Borough of Richmond upon Thames. Rebuilt in the early 18th century for Catherine Douglas, Duchess of Queensberry, it is a former grace-and-favour mansion.

== Notable residents ==
After the lodge had been left in disrepair for many years, Matthew Banckes rebuilt it for Laurence Hyde, 1st Earl of Rochester in 1691–92. On the death in 1779 of William Stanhope, 2nd Earl of Harrington, the lease was bought by Thomas Pitt, 1st Baron Camelford who purchased the fee simple in 1784 from the Crown, an act of Parliament having been passed for that purpose. The house was repaired and redecorated by John Soane in 1781. In 1790 it was sold by him to the Duke of Clarence (who later became William IV). James Hamilton, Viscount Hamilton was born there in 1786.

Prince Rupert Loewenstein, the long-time financial manager of the rock band The Rolling Stones, lived at Petersham Lodge until his death in 2014, having purchased it for about £2 million in 1987.
