= Prince Rupert Loewenstein =

Spanish-born German-Bavarian aristocrat (1933–2014)

Rupert, Prince of Loewenstein, Count of Löwenstein-Scharffneck
- Born: Rupert Louis Ferdinand Frederick Constantine Lofredo Leopold Herbert Maximilian Hubert John Henry zu Löwenstein-Wertheim-Freudenberg; 24 August 1933; Palma, Majorca, Spanish Second Republic
- Died: 20 May 2014 (aged 80); London, England
- Other name: "Rupie the Groupie"
- Occupation: Merchant banker
- Known for: The Rolling Stones' business adviser and financial manager, 1968–2007
- Spouse: Josephine Clare Lowry-Corry
- Children: Rudolf, Prince zu Löwenstein-Wertheim-Freudenberg; Konrad, Prince zu Löwenstein-Wertheim-Freudenberg; Maria Theodora Marjorie, Princess zu Löwenstein-Wertheim-Freudenberg, now Contessa della Gherardesca
- Parent(s): Leopold, Prince zu Löwenstein-Wertheim-Freudenberg and Countess Bianca Fischler von Treuberg

Rupert, Prince zu Löwenstein-Wertheim-Freudenberg, Count of Löwenstein-Scharffeneck (24 August 1933 – 20 May 2014) was a Spanish-born Bavarian aristocrat and the longtime financial manager of the rock band the Rolling Stones.

== Early life and education ==
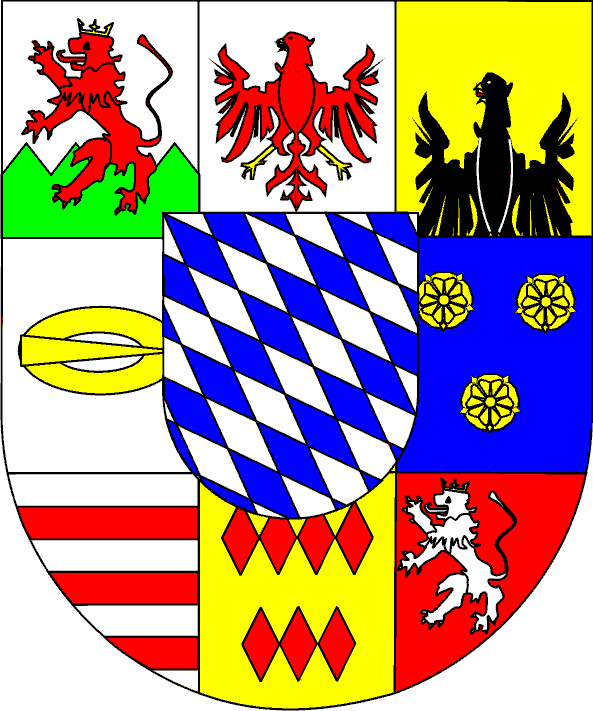
Arms of Löwenstein-Wertheim-Freudenberg

A scion of the former royal houses of Wittelsbach and Löwenstein-Wertheim, once rulers of Bavaria, Loewenstein was born in Palma, Majorca, Spain, the son of Leopold, Prince of Loewenstein-Wertheim-Freudenberg, who was brother of Hubertus, Prince of Löwenstein-Wertheim-Freudenberg, and his wife, Countess Bianca Henrietta Maria Fischler von Treuberg, descendant of Pedro I of Brazil. Both were of partial Jewish descent. Following his parents' separation, he and his mother arrived in England in 1940. Loewenstein was educated at the then Quaker St Christopher School in Letchworth, Hertfordshire, followed by Magdalen College, Oxford, where he studied medieval history.

== Banking ==
After school, Loewenstein worked as a stockbroker for Bache & Co. In 1963, he was part of a consortium formed to buy the merchant bank Leopold Joseph & Sons, along with fellow Oxford graduates Jonathan Guinness, Richard Cox-Johnson and Louis Heyman, and he became a director of the resulting firm. Leopold Joseph had previously been family owned by the Josephs, and carried out only specialised lines of banking business.

Following the acquisition, the business was substantially expanded to include advice on issues and mergers, investment advice, and particularly currency trading. By 1971, the firm had become one of the principal dealers in London in investment dollars. That year, it undertook a capital raising with a target of a net £940,000 to enable further expansion. In 1981, Loewenstein left to start his own company, Rupert Loewenstein Ltd, where most of his clients were new money, who he described as "much more interesting than old money. People with old money are nearly always having to be adjusted downwards; those with new money are much more realistic."

== The Rolling Stones ==
Loewenstein was the Rolling Stones' business adviser and financial manager from 1968 until 2007. In 1968, then working in London as a merchant banker, he was introduced to Mick Jagger by a mutual friend, art dealer Christopher Gibbs. According to Keith Richards, Loewenstein had never heard of Jagger before then. Jagger was of the opinion that the Stones' then-manager, Allen Klein, was not paying them everything they were due.

Loewenstein is credited with transforming the Stones into a "global brand and one of the world's richest bands", in particular by encouraging them to take into account potential tax advantages in any decisions about where to record, rehearse or perform. He managed their release from an existing contract, which paid them almost nothing, and persuaded them of the tax advantages of leaving England and moving to the south of France. He channelled their earnings through a series of companies in the Netherlands, and got them to rehearse in Canada, rather than the United States, to reduce their tax bill. Richards said, "[t]he tax rate [in the UK] in the early '70s on the highest earners was 83 percent, and that went up to 98 percent for investments... It was Rupert's advice that we become non-resident". Loewenstein also copyrighted the famous red tongue logo, and enlisted corporate sponsors such as General Electric for tours.

Richards has claimed that until they started to tour large venues in the 1980s, the Stones did not make much money from touring. The first important one was the 1981 and 1982 tours which broke box office records. By then, Loewenstein had reorganised the band's finances so that they did not "get cheated out of eighty percent of the takings... On a fifty-dollar ticket, up till then, [the band got] three dollars. He set up sponsorship and clawed back merchandising deals. He cleaned out the scams and fiddles, or most of them. He made us viable." In a 2002 interview, Richards said of Loewenstein: "He is a great financial mind for the market. He plays that like I play guitar. He does things like a little oil well. And currency—you know, Swiss francs in the morning, switch to marks in the afternoon, move to the yen, and by the end of the day, how many dollars?"

Loewenstein never got involved in the Rolling Stones' music. He said he preferred classical music and never played a Stones recording by choice; if he had to listen to rock and roll, he preferred the Beatles. Richards confirmed: "Rupert didn't like rock and roll; he thought 'composing' was something done with a pen and paper, like Mozart."

Loewenstein's daughter, Princess Dora Loewenstein (Maria Theodora Marjorie Loewenstein), wrote several first-hand accounts of life with the Rolling Stones, whom she had known since she was a child.

== Personal life and family ==
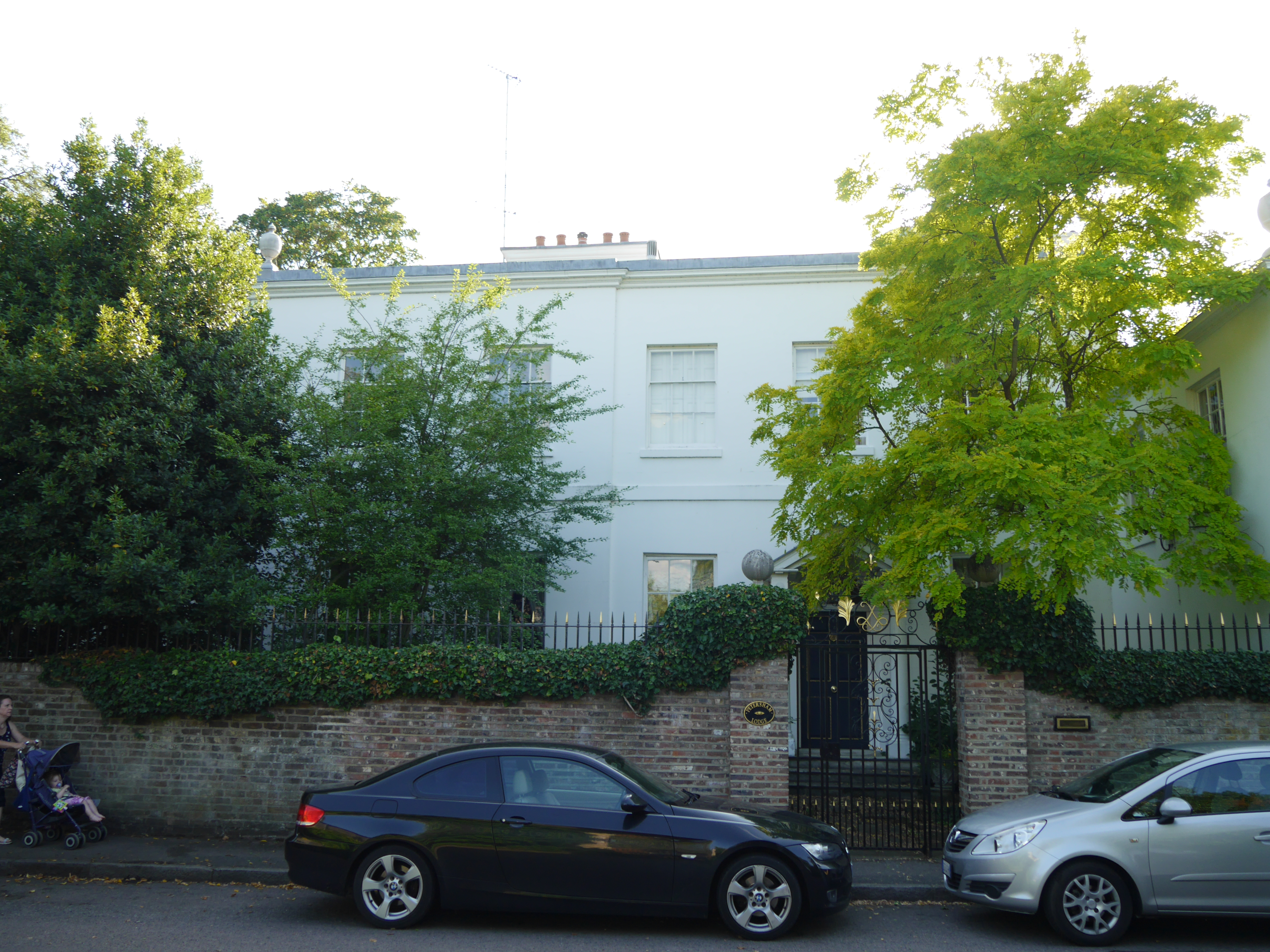
Petersham Lodge

On 18 July 1957, Loewenstein married Josephine Clare Lowry-Corry.

The couple had three children:

- Rudolf Amadeus Joseph Karl Ludwig Emmanuel (born 17 November 1957) who became a priest in the Dominican Order.
- Konrad Friedrich Ferdinand Johannes Ottakar Sylvester (born 26 November 1958) who also became a Catholic priest. He belongs to the Priestly Fraternity of St. Peter.
- Maria Theodora Dora Marjorie (born 11 July 1966) who has been married since 1998 to Count Manfredi della Gherardesca. Her godfather was Alexis von Rosenberg, Baron de Redé (1922–2004).

They lived in Petersham Lodge in River Lane, Petersham, London, a former grace-and-favour mansion, purchased for about £2 million in 1987. It is an early-18th-century house, built for the Duchess of Queensberry, and Grade II listed by Historic England.

Loewenstein was named to the International Best-Dressed Hall of Fame in 2001.

=== Catholicism ===
Loewenstein was a promoter of the traditional Latin Mass and had a letter on the subject published in The Times in 1975. He was active in Catholic orders of chivalry and was a Grand Inquisitor of the Sacred Military Constantinian Order of Saint George and president of the British association of the Sovereign Military Order of Malta.

== Autobiography ==
In 2013, Loewenstein published his autobiography, A Prince Among Stones: That Business with The Rolling Stones and Other Adventures (Bloomsbury, London), which disclosed details of the band's financial arrangements. Jagger was not pleased and was reported to have said: "Call me old-fashioned, but I don't think your ex-bank manager should be discussing your financial dealings and personal information in public."

== Death ==
Loewenstein died, age 80, in London on 20 May 2014 from complications of Parkinson's disease.

== See also ==
- List of alumni of Magdalen College, Oxford
- List of people from London
