= David Jarrett =

English cricketer and schoolmaster

Personal information
- Full name: David William Jarrett
- Born: 19 April 1952 (age 74); Bromsgrove, Worcestershire, England
- Batting: Right-handed
- Bowling: Right-arm medium
- Role: Batsman

Domestic team information
- Years: Team
- 1974–1975: Oxford University
- 1976: Cambridge University
- 1978–1981: Bedfordshire

Career statistics
Competition	First-class
Matches	21
Runs scored	678
Batting average	16.53
100s/50s	0/4
Top score	62
Balls bowled	6
Wickets	0
Bowling average	–
5 wickets in innings	–
10 wickets in match	–
Best bowling	–
Catches/stumpings	12/–
- Source: Cricinfo, 16 November 2015

David William Jarrett (born 19 April 1952) is an English schoolmaster who was the first man to win cricket Blues for both Cambridge University and Oxford University. He attended Wellington College before matriculating at the University of Oxford. He served as headmaster of Reed's School in Cobham, Surrey, from 1997 to 2014.

== Cricket career ==
Born in Bromsgrove, Worcestershire, Jarrett attended Wellington College, in Berkshire, where he played in the First XI, leading the batting in his final year, 1969, with 493 runs at an average of 37.92. He went up to Worcester College, Oxford, and played two seasons as a middle-order batsman in the Oxford cricket team. He achieved only moderate success, but won his Blue in 1975 and played a match-saving innings of 35 in the second innings against Cambridge after Oxford had lost five wickets cheaply. A few weeks later he began studies at St Catharine's College, Cambridge. In his first match for Cambridge, in April 1976, he made his highest first-class score, 62, after Cambridge had lost their first five wickets for 23 on the first morning against Essex. In the 1976 University match he made 56 in 190 minutes in the second innings in a vain attempt to deny Oxford victory. That was his last first-class match. He also won a hockey Blue at Cambridge.

He played a few matches for Worcestershire Second XI in 1976 and 1977, scoring a century against Yorkshire Second XI at Headingley in 1976. He played Minor Counties cricket for Bedfordshire in 1978 and 1981.

== Teaching career ==
Jarrett taught Classics for 20 years at Bedford School, where he was also master-in-charge of cricket. In 1997 he became headmaster at Reed's School in Cobham, Surrey, and served in that position until his retirement in 2014. In 1996 Reed's was ranked 671st in the national league tables for independent schools; by 2011 it had risen to 88th. He also raised the standard of cricket at Reed's, where an indoor cricket centre has been named in his honour.

He and his wife Anne have two children.
