= Shiva Feshareki =

Shiva Feshareki is a British-Iranian experimental composer, turntable artist and radio presenter. As a turntablist, she plays her compositions solo or alongside classical orchestras. She was born in London in 1987. She obtained a Doctorate of Music from the Royal College of Music. In 2017 she was honoured with the Ivor Novello Award for Innovation (formerly British Composer Award).

== Compositions ==
Through her research and compositional work she contributed to a rediscovery of some early pioneers of electronic music, such as Pauline Oliveros, Daphne Oram and Éliane Radigue. This includes her work on the completion and realisation of Daphne Oram's 'Still Point' at the BBC Proms alongside James Bulley.

2019

'Opus Infinity' - A Spatial Composition for Turntables, Ensemble and Bespoke Soundsystem. Premiere by Shiva Feshareki and Ensemble Modern at Frankfurt LAB (2020).

‘Meditation on a Spiral Staircase’ - for Turntables and Spatialised Brass Ensemble, premiered at SOUNDLab by Shiva Feshareki and the Brass players of Szczecin Philharmonic. 'Vapour' - Electronic Track (single)

‘Liquid Pyramid’ - Audio-Visual Collaboration with alx.000000

‘Perpetual Motion (in two contrasting movements)’ - for Violin, Cello and Electronics, premiered by Britten Sinfonia at Milton Court, Barbican Centre.

NEW FORMS LP

== Awards ==
- BASCA British Composer Award for Innovation in 2017
- London Music Masters Composer Award in 2016
- Royal Philharmonic Society Composition Prize 2009
- Women Make Music PRS award
- BBC/Guardian Young Composer of the Year in 2004

== UK and international festivals ==
- The BBC Proms
- MUTEK, Montreal
- MaerzMusik (The Long Now) - Kraftwerk, Berlin.
