= Seabury Capital =

American investment and merchant banking firm

Seabury Capital Group LLC
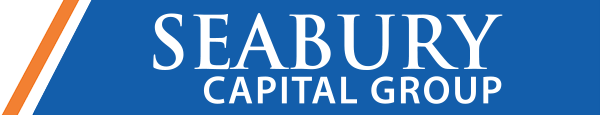
- Type: Private
- Industry: Financial services
- Founded: 1995; 31 years ago
- Founder: John Luth
- Headquarters: Carnegie Hall Tower, New York, United States
- Key people: John Luth (Chairman & CEO)
- Products: Investment banking, Merchant banking
- AUM: US$1.5 billion (2023)
- Number of employees: 265 (2022)
- Website: www.seaburycapital.com

Seabury Capital (Seabury) is an American boutique investment and merchant bank that has a focus on the aviation industry. Outside the U.S., the firm has offices in Europe and Asia.

== History ==
In 1995, John Luth founded Seabury Capital originally as an airline consultancy firm. The firm's name comes from Samuel Seabury, the first Anglican Bishop in the US who is an ancestor of Luth's wife. Luth, a former banker was previously the Chief financial officer of Continental Airlines who used his restructuring experience to carve out a niche that provided advice to other airline companies. The successful restructuring of Continental Airlines at the time lead to an increase in stock price which gave Luth a lot of cash from his equity stake in it. Luth cashed in his stake so he could fund Seabury.

Seabury became a boutique investment bank that advised aviation companies on financial matters as well as a strategic consultancy firm that offered advice on operational areas. Half its employees were bankers while the other half were former airline executives. While its consulting business received mixed reviews, it was its financial advisory business that stood out with praise on its expertise regarding areas such as aircraft lease restructuring. Luth was known as a ruthless negotiator who could still keep negotiations transparent and detailed. Many aircraft lessors compared Seabury to Babcock & Brown. There were concerns that the restructuring advisory business could lead to conflicts of interest from having advised so many airlines and so Ruth looked to Europe and Asia for new business.

In January 2015, Seabury launched a merchant banking division to invest in the aviation, aerospace, defense and transportation sectors. Seabury would only take minority interest stakes citing it focused only on long term growth.

In April 2016, Seabury formed Seabury Global Markets, a fintech distribution platform.

In February 2017, Accenture acquired Seabury's aviation consulting business.

In October 2023, Seabury merged with aviation financial advisory firm Plane View Partners.

== Business activities ==
=== Deals ===
- In 1997, advised Frontier Airlines after complications arose from a proposed merger with Western Pacific Airlines.
- In 2021, advised Avianca Group on raising exit financing.
- In 2022, advised Malaysia Airlines on acquiring 20 Airbus A330neos.
- In 2023, advised Gol Linhas Aéreas Inteligentes regarding debt restructuring.
