= Victoria Robey =

American-British arts administrator and former banker

Victoria Robey CBE
- Born: Victoria Susan Hull; 1959 or 1960 (age 65–66); Greenwich, Connecticut, US
- Education: Phillips Academy; Wesleyan University
- Occupation: Arts administrator
- Spouses: Richard Sharp (divorced); Simon Robey
- Children: 3
- Relatives: John Gutfreund (uncle)

Victoria Susan Robey, Lady Robey, CBE (née Hull; born 1960) is an American-British arts administrator and former banker.

== Early life ==
She is the daughter of Lloyd Nelson Hull (1922-2018), lawyer and civic leader, and Mary Gutfreund (sister of John Gutfreund), who married in 1957. She grew up in Greenwich, Connecticut, US. She was educated at Phillips Academy and Wesleyan University in Connecticut.

== Career ==
She started her career in mergers and acquisitions and corporate finance at Goldman Sachs in New York and London, and subsequently joined executive search company Russell Reynolds Associates.

Robey is chairman of the board of directors of the London Philharmonic Orchestra.

She is a co-founder of Music Masters, a UK-based music education charity which works with schools, teachers and arts organisations with the aim of making music accessible to all.

== Honours ==
She was appointed Officer of the Order of the British Empire (OBE) in the 2014 Birthday Honours and Commander of the Order of the British Empire (CBE) in the 2024 New Year Honours, both for services to music.

== Personal life ==
In 1987, she married Richard Sharp, a fellow Goldman Sachs banker, in Connecticut. In October 2008, they were living in Kensington, and had an estimated net worth of £500 million. They had three children together.

Some time after 2014, she married British investment banker Sir Simon Robey.
