= Simon Robey =

British investment banker

Sir Simon Robey
- Born: Simon Christopher Townsend Robey; 5 July 1960 (age 65)
- Education: Reed's School
- Alma mater: Magdalen College, Oxford
- Occupation: Investment banker
- Spouse: Victoria Hull
- Children: 3

Sir Simon Christopher Townsend Robey (born 5 July 1960) is a British investment banker and supporter of cultural organisations.

== Early life and education ==
Robey was adopted as a child and grew up in Cambridge. He has described himself as an 'odd child', with a 'fairly nerdy' upbringing. He attended Reed's School in Cobham before moving onto Magdalen College, Oxford as a choral scholar to read English.

== Business career ==
Robey worked for several investment banks. Latterly he worked for 25 years at Morgan Stanley, becoming co-chairman of global mergers and acquisition.

In 2013 he joined with Simon Robertson, a former Goldman Sachs banker, to form Robertson Robey Associates. Later in that year Simon Warshaw joined. In 2014 Robertson split from the group, leaving Robey and Warshaw to rebrand the firm as Robey Warshaw, with Robey’s former Morgan Stanley colleague Philip Apostolides also joining the firm.

== Other roles ==
Robey joined the board of the Royal Opera House on 1 July 2006, and was its chair from 2008 until 2017. In 2016 he also became the chair of Aldeburgh Music (now known as Snape Maltings).

== Recognition ==
Robey was knighted in the Queen's Birthday Honours for 2016 "for services to Music".

== Personal life ==
Robey is married to Victoria Hull. She was previously married to Richard Sharp, BBC chairman and a former investment banker. He has three daughters from his previous marriage, and three step-children from her previous marriage.

He owns Bramfield Hall, a 16th-century, Grade II*-listed building in Suffolk. The property had been owned by the Rabett family for 450 years until Robey acquired it.
