= Qatalyst Partners =

American investment bank

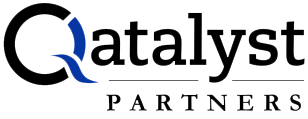
- Company type: Private
- Industry: Banking
- Founded: 2008
- Founder: Frank Quattrone
- Headquarters: San Francisco
- Area served: United States
- Key people: Frank Quattrone (Founder Executive Chairman), George Boutros (CEO), Jason DiLullo (President)
- Products: Boutique investment bank
- Number of employees: 58
- Website: http://www.qatalyst.com

Qatalyst Partners is an American technology-focused boutique investment bank that specialises in mergers and acquisitions. It is based in San Francisco with an additional office in London.

== History ==
Qatalyst Partners was founded in March 2008 by Frank Quattrone, Adrian Dollard, and Jonathan Turner.

In 2012, CEO Frank Quattrone was named the "Financial Dealmaker of the Year" by the San Francisco Business Journal for his work with the firm.

== Deals ==
The company's advisory and acquisition deals have included eBay, LinkedIn, LifeSize, Google, GoDaddy.com, Taleo, NetSuite, Motorola, and others.

Qatalyst has acted as lead adviser to various deals including

- LinkedIn's sale to Microsoft for $26.2 billion
- Analog Devices acquisition of Linear Technology for $15 billion
- KLA Tencor's sale to Lam Research for $11.5 billion
- NetSuite's $9.4 billion sale to Oracle
- HomeAway's $3.9 billion sale to Expedia

== See also ==
- Frank Quattrone
