= David Offensend =

American nonprofit businessman

David G. Offensend
- Born: 1953 (age 72–73)
- Education: Harvard Business School
- Occupations: President and CEO at Education Development Center

David G. Offensend (born 1953) is the president and chief executive officer of the global nonprofit Education Development Center. He joined EDC after 10 years as the chief operating officer at the New York Public Library (NYPL). Offensend received his bachelor's degree from Princeton University and a Master of Business Administration from the Harvard Business School. He was replaced at NYPL by Iris Weinshall.

He was a co-founder of Evercore Partners and was senior advisor to the private equity business when he left in 2004 to join the New York Public Library, where he stayed until 2014. Prior to that, he worked for the Texas investor Robert M. Bass and Lehman Brothers. He is a trustee of Princeton University.
