= Thomas Medlycott =

Thomas Medlycott may refer to:

- Thomas Medlycott (1628–1716), MP for Abingdon
- Thomas Medlycott (1662–1738), Chief Commissioner of Revenue in Ireland, MP for Milborne Port and Westminster, 2nd son of the above
- Thomas Medlycott (1697–1763), MP for Milborne Port from 1747 to 1763, nephew of the above.

== See also ==
- Medlycott Baronets, title in the Baronetage of the United Kingdom
