= Music Masters =

Music education charity

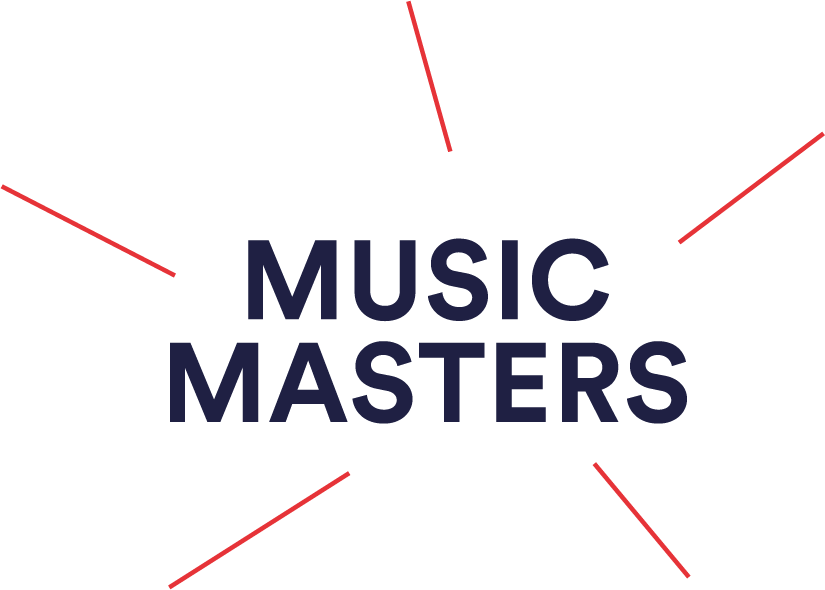
- Formation: 2007
- Founders: Victoria Robey and Professor Itzhak Rashkovsky
- Headquarters: London
- Website: www.musicmasters.org.uk

Music Masters (formerly London Music Masters/LMM) is a UK-based music education charity which works with schools, teachers and arts organisations with the aim of making music accessible to all.

Founded in 2007, Music Masters provides teaching, mentoring, financial support and performance opportunities to musicians between the ages of 4 and 25. Its flagship music education programme, the Schools Programme, raises the aspirations and nurtures the potential of disadvantaged primary school children across London.

Music Masters' creative partners include the London venues Southbank Centre and Wigmore Hall, the London Philharmonic Orchestra and the Royal College of Music as well as London Contemporary Orchestra and the Young Classical Artist Trust (YCAT). It also partners periodically with the US-based Sphinx Organization, a similar non-profit arts and youth development organisation.

Internationally renowned musicians such as Nicola Benedetti, Colin Currie, Sheku Kanneh-Mason, Harlem Quartet, Randall Goosby, Daniel Kidane, Benjamin Baker, Tom Poster, Elena Urioste, Benjamin Grosvenor, Nadine Benjamin, Anthony Marwood, Tai Murray support this charity's work as Ambassadors. During the last year of his life American composer Elliott Carter was also an Ambassador. Other recognised musicians, such as violinists Maxim Vengerov, Midori Gotō, Isata Kanneh-Mason and Plinio Fernandes have collaborated with Music Masters in specific projects.

== History ==
Music Masters was founded in 2007 by Victoria Robey and Professor Itzhak Rashkovsky with the dual aim of introducing classical music to primary school children from financially disadvantaged and diverse backgrounds and supporting some of the best of the next generation of young professional musicians. The organisation has worked with over 2000 children in inner city schools and helped develop the careers of the finest young musicians of their generation. Music Masters aims to invest in future generations in order to help them reach their full potential as both musicians and contributors to society.

== Governance ==
=== Chair ===
Victoria Robey 2007–2010, Julian Simmonds 2010–2012, Simon Freakley 2012–current.

=== Chief Executive/Executive Director ===
Roz De Vile 2020–Present, Robert Adediran 2013–2020, Victoria Robey CBE HonRCM 2009–2013, Mary Deissler 2008–2009.

=== Current Trustees ===
Simon Freakley (chairman), Sarah Bunting, Dr Steven Berryman, Mo Carrington, Talia Hull, James Joseph, Dr Kadiatu Kanneh-Mason, Rebekah Kofo-Kasumu, Philip Keller, Stuart Mason, John Nickson, Victoria Robey CBE HonRCM, Alicia Swannell and Philippa Thomas.

=== Former Trustees ===
John Antoniazzi, Shaun Bailey, Nicholas Berwin, Mo Carrington, Sir Vernon Ellis, John Gilhooly, Professor Colin Lawson, Professor Itzhak Rashkovsky (artistic director), Richard Sharp, Julian Simmonds, Dennis, Lord Stevenson of Coddenham CBE, Ed Vaizey MP and Timothy Walker.

You can find out more about the Advisory Council and the Development Committee on the Music Masters website.

== Current initiatives ==
Music Masters currently operates the following programmes:

=== Schools Programme ===
The Schools Programme (previously LMM Learning) is a community development programme that targets socio-economically disadvantaged areas in order to increase the ethnic, cultural and socio-economic diversity within the classical music industry. The project currently operates in a small number of primary schools across three London boroughs (Lambeth, Westminster and Islington) providing free musicianship, violin and cello lessons for children aged 4+.

The Schools Programme was one of the three finalists for the "Everyday Impact Award – New Enterprises" category of the 2012 Social Change Awards organised by the Directory of Social Change. In 2015 Music Masters was awarded the Excellence in Early Years and Primary Music Award] in the third annual Music Teacher Awards at a ceremony held in London.

=== I'm In – The Inclusive Music Index ===
Music Masters has developed a diversity and inclusion audit tool for organisations in the music sector, which provides an analysis of behaviours and attitudes across the whole organisation, looking at organisational drivers, culture, leadership and accountability, procurement, recruitment, talent management, marketing, the audience and customer experience. The tool, called I'M IN, was developed together with global consulting firm AlixPartners,

=== Musicians of Change (PGCEi) ===
Musicians of Change (PGCEi) is a one-year teaching course, jointly led by Music Masters and Birmingham City University. The course is designed to equip teachers with the essential and practical skills needed for the demands of group instrument teaching.

== LMM Awards (2009–2017) ==
=== LMM Awards ===
The LMM Awards supported exceptional violinists in entering the professional classical music industry. Music Masters provided financial support, career guidance and performance opportunities including a Wigmore Hall recital and a concerto with the London Philharmonic Orchestra. Music Masters also regularly commissioned new works of music to be premièred by the Award Holders.

==== 2009–2012 ====
The first LMM Awards were granted from 2009 to 2012 to Jennifer Pike (UK), Agata Szymczewska (Poland) and Elena Urioste (USA).

==== 2012–2015 ====
Violinists Benjamin Beilman (USA), Hyeyoon Park (South Korea), Alexandra Soumm (Russia/France) were all LMM Award Holders from 2012 to 2015.

==== 2016–2017 ====
Violinist Marc Bouchkov (France) and composers Jack White (UK) and Shiva Feshareki (UK) were all LMM award holders from 2016 to 2017.
