= Boutique investment bank =

Non-full service, specialized investment bank

A boutique investment bank is a small investment bank that specializes in at least one aspect of investment banking, generally corporate finance, although some banks' strengths are retail in nature, such as Charles Schwab. Of those involved in corporate finance, capital raising, mergers and acquisitions and restructuring and reorganizations are their primary activities. Boutiques usually provide advisory and consulting services, but lack capacity to provide funding. After the Gramm–Leach–Bliley Act, investment banks have either had a retail deposit base (JPMorgan Chase, Citi, Bank of America) or have had funding from overseas owners or from Wealth Management arms (UBS, Deutsche Bank, Morgan Stanley). Boutique banks on the other hand often turn to other banks to provide funding or deal directly with capital rich firms such as insurers to provide capital for deals.

Boutique investment banks generally work on smaller deals involving middle-market companies, and usually assist on the sell or buy-side in mergers and acquisitions transactions. In addition, they often specialize in certain industries such as media, healthcare, industrials, technology or energy. Some banks may specialize in certain types of transactions, such as capital raising or mergers and acquisitions, or restructuring and reorganization. Typically, boutique investment banks may have a limited number of offices and may specialize in certain geographic regions, thus the moniker 'regional investment bank'. Traditionally, boutique investment banks are specialized in certain fields of corporate finance and thus not full-service. However, the term is often used for non-bulge bracket full-service investment banks, banks that are also known as middle-market investment banks.

== History ==
During 2014, The Financial Times The New York Times, and The Economist all published favorable articles regarding the growing trend of corporations to hire boutique investment banks. Reasons cited included their absence of conflicts, independence, and skill of one or a relative few individuals. The discrediting of traditionally conflicted Wall Street investment banking firms, especially those listed as full-service or conglomerates on the list of investment banks, due to their role in the creation or exacerbation of the 2008 financial crisis, is cited as a primary reason for the ascendancy of these boutique firms. However, advances in technology which permit the outsourcing of all non-core aspects of the firm have also been cited as a cause of this David versus Goliath phenomenon.

Working at boutique investment banks generally requires working longer hours than at larger banks, even though the majority of boutiques are founded and led by former partners at large banks.

As larger investment banks were hit hard by the Great Recession of the 2000s, many senior bankers left to join boutiques, some of which largely resemble the partnerships that ruled Wall Street in the 1970s and 1980s. Boutique investment banks took a greater share of the M&A and advising market at the same time.

Large boutique firms include Evercore, Lazard, Centerview Partners, PJT Partners, Rothschild & Co and Moelis & Company.

== Services ==
Boutique investment banks may be engaged in providing one or more of the following services:

- Connecting clients, especially with regard to IPOs or further stock offerings.
- Mergers and Acquisitions advisory
- Underwriting debt and/or equity securities
- Capital raising (e.g. private equity deals; not as common due to small firm size)

== Notable boutique investment banks ==
The following is a partial list of notable boutique investment banks:

- Allen & Company
- Centerview Partners
- Ducera Partners
- Evercore
- Financial Technology Partners
- Greenhill & Co.
- Guggenheim Partners
- Houlihan Lokey
- Lazard
- Leerink Partners
- LionTree
- Moelis & Company
- Perella Weinberg Partners
- PJT Partners
- Qatalyst Partners
- The Raine Group
- Rothschild & Co
- Seabury Capital
- Zaoui & Co.

== See also ==
- Bulge Bracket investment banks
- List of largest investment banks
- List of hedge funds
- List of private-equity firms
- Fund of funds
- Sovereign wealth fund
- Boutique law firm
