= Keith Medlycott =

English cricketer (born 1965)

Cricket information
- Batting: Right-handed
- Bowling: Slow left arm orthodox

Career statistics
Competition	First-class	List A
Matches	141	58
Runs scored	3,584	431
Batting average	25.94	15.39
100s/50s	3/21	0/0
Top score	153	44*
Balls bowled	22,504	1,791
Wickets	357	49
Bowling average	32.26	29.71
5 wickets in innings	18	0
10 wickets in match	6	0
Best bowling	8/52	4/18
Catches/stumpings	90/–	17/–
- Source: CricketArchive, 8 November 2022

Keith Thomas Medlycott (born 12 May 1965 at Whitechapel, Middlesex) is an English former cricketer, a left-arm spinner and middle order batsman for Surrey and Northern Transvaal. He is known in the game as "Medders".

== First-class career ==
Medlycott's career in first-class cricket spanned 1984 to 1991, and in List A matches from 1985 to 1991 (but with one final match in 2005).

Of his three first-class centuries, one was made on debut against Cambridge University, whilst another was made in Surrey's record seventh wicket partnership of 262 – with Jack Richards – against Kent in 1987.

== International career ==
Medlycott travelled to the West Indies during England's 1989–90 tour, but did not play in any Test matches. In the winter of 1990 he toured Sri Lanka with the England A team.

== Minor level cricket ==
Medlycott also played for the Minor County Buckinghamshire, appearing for them in one match in the Cheltenham and Gloucester Trophy against Lancashire in 2005, fourteen years after his previous appearance in a List A fixture.

== Coaching and administration ==
At the end of 1991, Medlycott was forced into premature retirement at the age of 26 due to developing a tendency to fail to let go of the ball when bowling, known as the bowling "yips". In 1997, he returned to Surrey as a coach, where he helped secure three County Championship titles and four one-day trophies. He moved on from his position in 2003, and went on to work for the International Cricket Council as a high performance manager for umpires.

In 2007, Medlycott became cricket professional and coach at Reed's School in Cobham, Surrey.

In February 2009, Medlycott was appointed Director of Cricket at Purley Cricket Club. He was also team captain.
