= Robey Warshaw =

Investment bank based in London

Robey Warshaw LLP
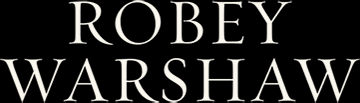
- Type: Private
- Industry: Investment banking
- Founded: 1 October 2013; 12 years ago
- Defunct: October 2025
- Fate: Acquired by Evercore
- Headquarters: 31 St James's Place, London, United Kingdom
- Key people: Partners: Sir Simon Robey; Philip Apostolides; Simon Warshaw; George Osborne; Chetan Singh
- Revenue: £40.1 million (2021)
- Net income: £30.1 million (2021)
- Website: robeywarshaw.com

Robey Warshaw LLP was a boutique investment bank based in London. The firm was founded in 2013 and was led by investment bankers Sir Simon Robey, Philip Apostolides, and Simon Warshaw. In 2025, it was acquired by Evercore, a US-based investment bank.

== History ==
Robey, Apostolides and Warshaw were prominent dealmakers in the City of London prior to setting up the firm. Robey was a former co-head of mergers and acquisitions at Morgan Stanley, Warshaw was a co-head of investment banking at UBS, while Apostolides was a managing director in Morgan Stanley's financial sponsors group. In 2020, former Chancellor of the Exchequer George Osborne joined the firm as the first new Partner since its founding.

According to The Observer, banking experts have attributed Robey Warshaw's early success to the connections of its founders and its ability to remain discreet during negotiations owing to its small size, at fewer than 20 employees. The Telegraph highlighted the firm's "personal approach" favoured by corporate executives.

In July 2025, the company announced it had agreed to be acquired by Evercore for £146 million. The transaction closed in October 2025, with Robey Warshaw's team being integrated into Evercore's.

== Partners ==
- Sir Simon Robey (since 2013)
- Philip Apostolides (since 2013)
- Simon Warshaw (since 2013)
- George Osborne (since 2020)
- Chetan Singh (since 2024)

== Notable activities ==
- In 2014, Robey Warshaw helped AstraZeneca successfully fend off a politically charged merger bid by Pfizer.
- In 2015, it served as adviser to BG Group and SABMiller in their mergers with Royal Dutch Shell and Anheuser-Busch InBev respectively.
- In 2018, it advised Comcast on their takeover bid for Sky UK.
- In 2021, it advised the London Stock Exchange Group on its acquisition of data provider Refinitiv. In the same year, it advised National Grid plc on its purchase of Western Power Distribution.
- In 2022, it advised a consortium led by former Guggenheim Partners, President Todd Boehly on its bid for Chelsea F.C. In the same year it also advised HSBC on its defense against a proposed spin-off of its Asian unit by its shareholder, Ping An Insurance.
- In 2023, it advised HSBC on their rescue of Silicon Valley Bank's UK arm, with Simon Robey and George Osborne at the helm. In the same year, it also advised John Lewis Partnership on a potential controversial stake sale, which would end John Lewis' 100% staff-owned model.
- In 2025, it advised Santander UK on its acquisition of TSB Bank.
