= Independent advisory firm =

Type of investment bank

An independent advisory firm (sometimes less accurately called an advisory boutique) is an investment bank that provides strategic and financial advice to clients, primarily including corporations, financial sponsors, and governments. Revenues are typically generated by providing deal-specific advice related to mergers and acquisitions as well as financing. The WSJ noted in January 2016 that "boutique is a fuzzy label, defined as much by what these firms do (mostly give M&A advice) as what they don’t do (trading, lending, much in the way of underwriting)."

== History ==
=== 1800s: Early history ===
Rothschild was founded in the City of London in 1811.

The largest independent firm, Lazard, got its start in 1848 and only went public in 2005 under the leadership of Bruce Wasserstein, who unified its disparate branches.

=== 1980s: New players established ===
In September 2015 the FT wrote, "The concept of an advisory boutique dates back to the 1980s, when some of Wall Street’s biggest names ditched established banks to set up their own firms — often after legendary bust-ups. Peter Peterson and Stephen Schwarzman quit Lehman Brothers after an epic power struggle to start the Blackstone Group in 1985. Blackstone started out as an M&A advisory firm before branching out into private equity investing, a formula that made both men billionaires. A few years later, Bruce Wasserstein and Joseph Perella left First Boston and created Wasserstein Perella. In 2006 Perella co-founded Perella Weinberg Partners, with Peter Weinberg, then of Goldman Sachs."

=== 1990s: Conglomerate model ascendent ===
The repeal of the 1933 Glass–Steagall Act that kept investment banks and commercial banks separate led to significant consolidation. The FT wrote that in the 1990s, "the 'financial supermarket' model was ascendant." Sandy Weill rolled up various commercial banks, investment banks, brokerages and insurance companies to form Citigroup. J.P. Morgan and Chase Manhattan agreed to combine and Credit Suisse swallowed Donaldson, Lufkin & Jenrette in 2000.

=== 2000s: Resurgence and wave of new firms ===
Evercore Partners was founded in 1996 by Roger Altman and has a broader investment banking business than most independent firms, including equity research and underwriting services. Greenhill was also founded in 1996.

Greenhill listed its shares in 2004, Lazard in 2005, Evercore in 2006, and Moelis in 2014.

Ex-UBS banker Blair Effron founded Centerview Partners in 2006 because of the difference between smaller and larger firms, where he worked most of his career. He told the FT in September 2015, “Dillon Read where I started was about providing intellectual capital. UBS [which acquired Dillon Read in 1995] was a provider of financial capital.”

Following the 2008 financial crisis, there was a heightened sense of conflict of interest around the bulge bracket wall street banks. Dealogic recorded that the market share of U.S. boutiques hit 18% in the first half of 2015, up from 8% in 2008, with independent firms participating in six of the top 10 M&A deals.

In March 2012 the FT wrote, "a long-term and fundamental trend is coming back to the fore: the perennial fight between smaller boutique advisers and their bulge-bracket rivals has picked up pace."

In 2013, 80% of the top 10 M&A deals included independent advisors. In March 2013 Fortune wrote of the purported competitive advantages independent advisory firms face.

The WSJ noted in April 2014 that "investors and clients are drawn to nimbler firms with less-complicated business models and fewer regulatory barriers ... Sprawling financial malls such as Goldman Sachs and J.P. Morgan hawk a menu of products: deal advice, lending, derivatives and so on. Boutiques purport to sell only the smarts and experience of their bankers. As a result, they claim that their counsel is unsullied by other interests." However, many have diversified into other areas such as asset management.

PJT Partners was founded in the summer of 2014 and merged with Blackstone's corporate finance and private funds business, floating on the NYSE in late 2015.

In March 2015 the Financial Post wrote, "in a coup that grabbed headlines ... Centerview Partners and another U.S. independent advisory firm, Lazard, shut out the majors in the year’s biggest deal [until that point]: the US$75 billion merger of Kraft Foods and H.J. Heinz".

Hugh McGee of Barclays (formerly Lehman Brothers), who earned a $13m bonus in 2013, told the FT in September 2015 that “between regulatory compliance and internal bureaucracy I found myself spending 80 per cent of my time on non-client activities, which is really not fun”.

== Notable firms ==
=== Current firms ===
- Centerview Partners
- Evercore
- Greenhill
- Guggenheim Partners
- Houlihan Lokey
- Lazard
- Moelis & Company
- Perella Weinberg Partners
- PJT Partners
- Rothschild

=== Defunct firms ===
- Dillon Read
- Salomon Brothers
- S.G. Warburg
- Wasserstein Perella
