= Wasserstein =

Wasserstein is a surname and can refer to:

- Abraham Wasserstein (1921–1995), a German-born British and Israeli classicist
- Bernard Wasserstein (born 1948), a British historian
- Bruce Wasserstein (1947–2009), an American former investment banker and former CEO of Lazard
- Wendy Wasserstein (1950–2006), an American playwright
- Leonid Nasonovich Vasershtein, a Russian-American mathematician

It is also used to name:

- Wasserstein metric, a mathematical distance measure
- Dresdner Kleinwort Wasserstein, an investment bank, part of Dresdner Bank
- Wasserstein Perella & Co., an investment bank built by Bruce Wasserstein and Joseph R. Perella
