= Gary Parr =

American banker

Gary W. Parr
- Born: February 16, 1957 (age 69)
- Education: University of North Carolina (BSBA); Northwestern University (MBA)
- Occupations: Investment Banker, Wall Street Executive, Philanthropist
- Employer: Apollo Global Management
- Known for: Wall Street Deal History
- Spouse: Katherine (April 2016-present)

Gary Wilton Parr (born 1957) is an American investment banker and Wall Street executive. He is Senior Managing Director of Apollo Global Management and a member of its Management Committee. Previously, he was a deputy chairman and member of the Board of Directors of Lazard. He was one of the most prominent advisors to governments and companies during the Great Financial Crisis.

== Early life and education ==
Parr is from Charlotte, North Carolina. He attended the University of North Carolina at Chapel Hill and graduated with a BSBA in 1979 with Honors, Phi Beta Kappa and Beta Gamma Sigma, and was in Pi Kappa Phi fraternity. He also received an MBA from Northwestern University's Kellogg School of Management.

== Career ==
=== Wall Street ===
Parr began his career at First Boston Corp., where he worked on insurance industry mergers. In 1988, he was part of a group that formed the advisory firm Wasserstein Perella, co-founded by Bruce Wasserstein and Joseph Perella and rose to be co-president. In 1993, he moved to Morgan Stanley, where his roles included heading the Global Financial Institutions Group and co-heading the Global M&A Department with William Lewis Jr., as well as Vice Chairman. He joined Lazard in 2003.

At Lazard, he was a deputy chairman and on the board of directors.

He has advised clients on many of the largest mergers and acquisitions and strategic investments in the financial services industry, including: the sale of Lehman's North American investment banking business to Barclays; the sale of Bear Stearns to JPMorgan Chase; Mitsubishi UFJ's $9 Billion investment in Morgan Stanley; Kuwait's investment in Citigroup; China Investment Corp.'s investment in Morgan Stanley; the merger of Bank of New York and Mellon; the sale of Donaldson Lufkin & Jenrette to Credit Suisse First Boston; Dean Witter Discover's merger with Morgan Stanley; and Berkshire Hathaway's acquisition of GEICO.

Gary is a founder of Parré Chocolat, a luxury chocolate brand with an ethical trade ethos.

=== Board leadership and philanthropy ===
- New York Philharmonic: Parr is Chairman Emeritus of the Board, and served two terms as chairman from September 2009 to February 2015.
- Venetian Heritage: Parr is a former chairman of the Board of Venetian Heritage, a historical preservation and restoration organization focusing on the former Republic of Venice's legacy of art and architecture.

Other Board Memberships:

- Morgan Library & Museum
- Berkeley Divinity School at Yale
- Lincoln Center: Executive Committee and Board
- Kenan-Flagler Business School at the University of North Carolina at Chapel Hill

=== Parr Center for Ethics at the University of North Carolina ===
Parr established the Parr Center for Ethics at the University of North Carolina at Chapel Hill in 2004 and the university recently celebrated its 20th Anniversary. Geoffrey Sayre-McCord, an eminent meta-ethicist specializing in moral realism and the ethical perspectives of David Hume is a co-founder and first executive director of the Parr Center for Ethics. Among other activities, the Parr Center sponsors visiting scholars and presentations by philosophers. The Parr Center is the home of the National High School Ethics Bowl, a nationwide competition that inspires and challenges high school students across the country to develop their ethical reasoning skills. Parr continues to serve as Chairman of the Parr Center and Sarah Stroud became Director of the Center in 2018.

=== Parr Shakespeare Prize for Excellence in Teaching Shakespeare ===
Parr created and launched the national Parr Shakespeare Prize for Excellence in Teaching Shakespeare in 2025, in honor of his high school English teacher Miss Gragg, who instilled his love for the works of William Shakespeare. He gathered a prominent team of advisors and judges for the Prize, including Eric Rasmussen, James Shapiro, Zachary Lesser, David Kastan, and Ayanna Thompson, and launched the prize throughout all fifty United States.

== Personal life ==
He is a preservationist, having restored 10 historically relevant properties, including Chastellux, a McKim, Mead, and White designed French Chateau on ten acres of Frederick Olmsted-designed grounds in Tuxedo Park, New York; Casa Alva, designed by a Palm Beach architect Maurice Fatio for Consuelo Vanderbilt Balsan, the Former Duchess of Marlboro, in 1935; a 1906 Arts and Crafts movement house in New Canaan, Connecticut; and a 1911 John Russell Pope English Jacobean mansion on Park Avenue on the Upper East Side of Manhattan.

Parr and Fred Whittemore raised a fund that produced ten films with Hart Sharp Entertainment, including: Boys Don't Cry (1999 film), Revolutionary Road, Proof, and Nicholas Nickleby.

Parr is married to Katherine, a former public schoolteacher.

Parr is known to be "a frugal sort who says he cuts his own hair".

== Awards and recognition ==
=== Awards ===
He was awarded the Distinguished Alumnus Award from the University of North Carolina in 2013.

He was honored by Young Audiences for Learning in 2015 for his contributions to the performing arts.

=== Media mentions and books ===
Parr has been frequently interviewed about his expertise by business media throughout his career. He has been included in books on Wall Street history, including Too Big To Fail by Andrew Ross Sorkin about the Great Financial Crisis, The Last Tycoons, The Sellout, and Street Fighters.
