= Mack Rossoff =

American financier and investment banker

- Born: St. Louis
- Citizenship: United States
- Education: Harvard Business School, (MBA, 1984)
- Alma mater: Princeton University, (AB, 1974)
- Occupation: Financier
- Years active: 32
- Employer(s): Rossoff & Company LLC; Banc of America Securities (prior); Soundview Technology Group (prior); JP Morgan (prior); Schroder Wertheim & Co. (prior); Dillon, Read & Co. (prior); Wasserstein Perella & Co. (prior); The First Boston Corporation (prior)
- Known for: Mergers and Acquisitions, Corporate Finance
- Notable work: Financial advisor to Kohlberg Kravis Roberts during the leveraged buyout of RJR Nabisco
- Spouse: Jeannette Boyer
- Website: www.rossoffco.com

Mack Rossoff is an American financier and investment banker. He is Managing Director at GLC Advisors, LLC and the founder of Rossoff & Co., an independent financial advisory firm based in New York City. Rossoff has had a long career in investment banking, with over 39 years of experience. GLC Advisors and Rossoff & Co. operate in the United States and internationally.

== Career ==
Rossoff started his career in 1982 with The First Boston Corporation, predecessor to Credit Suisse, where he advised Taft Broadcasting on acquisition of Gulf Broadcasting, Time Inc.’s acquisition of Scott Foresman & Co., Tri-Star Pictures on its initial public offering and Ted Turner on his junk bond offering. At First Boston, Rossoff worked with Bruce Wasserstein and Joseph Perella and later joined them in a move to Wasserstein Perella & Co.

While with Wasserstein Perella & Co., Rossoff worked on several notable transactions, including Campeau Corporation's acquisition of Federated Department Stores, Time Inc.’s merger with Warner Communications, Inc., and Kohlberg Kravis Roberts leveraged buyout of RJR Nabisco Inc., valued at a record $25 billion. Rossoff's role in the leveraged buyout of RJR Nabisco Inc. is referenced in Barbarians at the Gate, the best-selling book that chronicled the transaction.

Rossoff went on to be a managing director at Dillon, Read & Co. in the corporate finance department, head of corporate finance at Schroder Wertheim & Co., global head of media and entertainment at JP Morgan and managing director and head of mergers and acquisitions at Soundview Technology Group, Inc. Following Soundview Technology Group, Rossoff joined Banc of America Securities as a managing director in the media and telecom group. While at Banc of America Securities, Rossoff advised Columbia Sussex on the $2.75 billion contested acquisition of Aztar Corp.

During his career Rossoff has been on a number of corporate boards including Director of Oneclip.com. Rossoff is an Honorary Trustee of Congregation Rodeph Sholom (Manhattan) and was Vice Chair and Trustee of Ethical Culture Fieldston School

== Early life ==
Rossoff grew up in Palos Verdes, California, the son of Lyn Marcella and Jerome Rosoff. He has two siblings, Bob Rossoff and Lauri Rossoff Kinney. He received his AB cum laude from Princeton University in 1974. While at Princeton, Rossoff was Co-Winner of the 1869 Thesis Prize for best senior thesis on Ethics. Rossoff received his MBA with Second Year Honors from Harvard Business School. He is married to the attorney Jeannette Boyer.
