= Robert B. McKeon =

American businessman (1954–2012)

- Born: Robert Brian McKeon; August 6, 1954
- Died: September 10, 2012 (aged 58)
- Education: Fordham University; Harvard Business School (M.B.A.)
- Occupations: Private equity investor; Mergers and acquisitions (M&A), founder of Veritas Capital
- Spouses: Clare Elizabeth Smith McKeon; Patricia Finnegan
- Children: Alexander, Robert, Jacqueline, and James
- Parent(s): Diana Brady McKeon and Donald Stillwell McKeon

Robert B. McKeon (August 6, 1954 – September 10, 2012) was Chairman of New York-based Veritas Capital Management LLC, a private equity firm that he formed in 1992. He was also a founding partner of Wasserstein Perella & Co., where he served as the Chairman of Wasserstein Perella Management Partners.

== Early life ==
McKeon was born to Diana Brady McKeon and Donald Stillwell McKeon and grew up with six siblings in Bronx, NY. He attended Albertus Magnus High School in Bardonia, New York. McKeon, learned about takeovers from his father's experience-Donald McKeon was a deliveryman for Drake's cakes, a company that was sold three times in three years in the late 1980s when McKeon was in his thirties. He graduated magna cum laude from Fordham University with a Bachelor of Science in Economics and received a Master of Business Administration from Harvard Business School.

== Career ==
McKeon began his career at First Boston Corporation in the Mergers and Acquisitions Group, later becoming a director. In the 1980s, First Boston's merger and acquisition team was led by Wall Street legends, investment banker Bruce Wasserstein and financier Joseph R. Perella, who orchestrated transactions such as the leveraged buyout of Federated Stores, earning First Boston $200 million in fees. In a New York Times 2007 article, Parella was described as "one of the financial industry’s sharpest recruiters" and Wasserstein was described as the biggest star of the dealmakers in the 1980s Mergers and acquisitions (M&A) boom in The Wall Street Journal. At First Boston, and then at Wasserstein Perella after 1988, Parella and Wasserstein helped create "a dynasty of bankers and executives that has spread throughout Wall Street and corporate America".

=== Wasserstein Perella & Co. ===
In February 1988, Wallerstein and Perella announced their resignations from First Boston. McKeon, who was 34 years old at the time, along with Bill Lambert and Charles Ward left to join Wasserstein Perella & Co., sometimes referred to as "Wasserella" a "boutique investment bank". By 2007, Wasserella was known as a "dynasty of bankers and executives that has spread throughout Wall Street and corporate America". McKeon became the Chairman of Wasserstein Perella Management Partners, the group's private equity arm, leading deals such as the very successful acquisition and management of Maybelline Cosmetics.

=== Veritas Capital ===
With the success of Maybelline, in 1992 McKeon and Thomas Campbell (a former banker from Wasserstein) founded the New York-based Veritas Capital, a private equity firm that specializes in "intelligence", "information technology", such as Global Tel Link (2009) and military and defense industry investments, such as the controversial Dyncorp International LLC (2004), MZM Inc. (2005), Lockheed Martin, and Raytheon, which were acquired under McKeon's tenure.

In the 2000s, Veritas under McKeon's tenure, made a major play in homeland security, first with the purchase of sections of DynCorp in 2004 and then with the 2005 acquisition of MZM Inc. in the wake of the Cunningham scandal. Because of the scandal, Veritas changed the name from DynCorp to Athena Innovative Solutions Inc. (now CACI).

Following its acquisition of DynCorp (Athena Innovative Solutions Inc.), Veritas under McKeon, built it into a "formidable defense contractor." It was sold to CACI International Inc. in 2007.

By 2006, Veritas had prepared DynCorp for an IPO on the New York Stock Exchange, but its success created a rift between McKeon and Campbell, resulting in dueling claims in court between the two. In 2006, McKeon had fired Campbell, with whom he had had a collegial relationship for two decades, claiming that Campbell allegedly earned $100 million in 2002 from Omnicom Group Inc. dealings related to DynCorp. Campbell counterclaimed that "McKeon had profited by millions of dollars, but had "shut him out" of the DynCorp IPO.

In 2012 Veritas acquired its largest investment, with the purchase of Thomson Reuters Corp's "health-care data business" for $1.25 billion. At the time of his death, Veritas had $2.2 billion in assets under management. Senior partners Ramzi Musallam, who worked at Veritas since 1992, Hugh Evans and Benjamin Polk took over Veritas management in 2012. In 1999, the state of Connecticut invested $125 million in a Veritas fund. Veritas denied knowledge about a Veritas consultant who had "confessed to paying kickbacks" to a "Connecticut official".

== Philanthropy and other activities ==
McKeon supported his alma maters, including Albertus Magnus High School, and served on the board of trustees at Fordham University. In 2005, he established The Robert B. McKeon Fellowship Fund for Military Personnel at Harvard University. He was a member of the Council on Foreign Relations, where he endowed in perpetuity in 2007, The Robert B. McKeon Endowment Series on Military Strategy and Leadership. Mr. McKeon was appointed by the Governor of Connecticut to serve as Chairman of the state's Health and Educational Facilities Authority, a public authority that finances hospitals and universities in Connecticut. He and his wife, Clare Smith McKeon, an Oxford graduate who worked at Christie's, were avid art collectors.

== Death ==
McKeon took his own life on September 10, 2012, in Darien, Connecticut. McKeon Hall, a residence hall at Fordham University's Lincoln Center campus, is named after him.
