= Jon B. Kutler =

American chief executive

Jon B. Kutler (born October 16, 1956) is chairman, chief executive officer and founder of Admiralty Partners, Inc. and a trustee of the California Institute of Technology where he serves as the chairman of the Jet Propulsion Laboratory Committee.

== Education ==
Kutler is a graduate of the United States Naval Academy and holds a Bachelor of Science degree in naval architecture. He received his Master of Business Administration degree from the Harvard Business School.

== Career ==
Kutler is a nationally recognized expert in the fields of aerospace and defense. He began his investment-banking and private equity career on Wall Street in 1984, after serving ten years in various positions in the U.S. Navy. He has worked in mergers and acquisitions for Goldman Sachs & Co., The First Boston Corporation and was managing director in charge of the West Coast office and international aerospace/defense practice of Wasserstein Perella & Co. In 1992 he founded the Quarterdeck companies, which includes Quarterdeck Investment Partners, Inc., a leading merger and acquisition advisory firm servicing the global aerospace and defense sectors and Quarterdeck Equity Partners ("QEP"), a private equity firm. In December, 2002 he sold the merger and acquisition advisory businesses of Quarterdeck to NYSE listed investment banking firm Jefferies LLC to focus his efforts in his private equity investment company which he then renamed Admiralty Partners, Inc. Among Admiralty's investments has been AmSafe a leading provider of safety systems to the aerospace and defense industry and a maker of the iconic brand of tear drop shaped commercial aircraft seatbelts.

== Personal life ==
In December 2005, Kutler was buried in an avalanche while skiing in Austria, an experience he credits with changing his outlook on life.
