= Miner Institute =

Coordinates: 44.88893°N 73.46628°W

William H. Miner Agricultural Research Institute
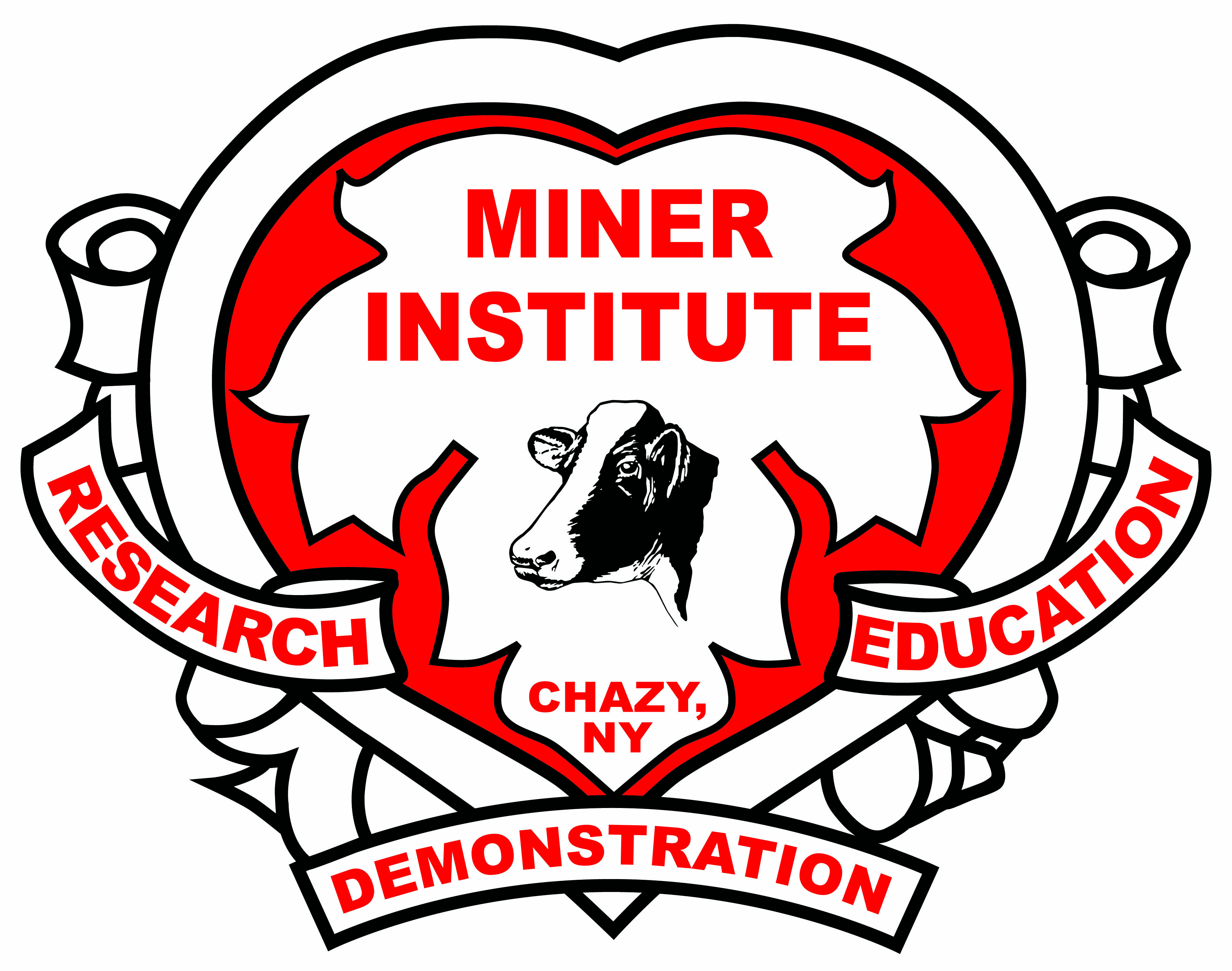
- Founded: 1951
- Founder: William H. Miner (posthumous)
- Purpose: Dairy nutrition research and Education
- Location: Chazy, New York, United States
- Method: Laboratories, Dairy Herd, Demonstration, Research Funding
- Key people: Heather Dann (President)

The William H. Miner Agricultural Research Institute is a private, not-for-profit educational research institution with an operational dairy farm and Morgan horse herd located in Chazy, New York on the Adirondack Coast of Lake Champlain. Miner Institute currently encompasses over 8,600 acres of forest and agricultural land in the Little Chazy and Great Chazy river watersheds. The Institute is funded through an endowment, research grants and the sale of milk from its dairy operation.

Created in 1951, the Institute's mission is to offer quality research, education, and demonstration programs addressing critical agricultural and environmental issues relevant to Northern New York, Vermont and Quebec farmers.

== History ==
Heart's Delight Farm, the land that would become Miner Institute, was developed by William Henry Miner on his family homestead of 144 acres, beginning in 1903. Miner became a wealthy railroad industrialist as the inventor of railcar draft gears. After becoming a successful entrepreneur in Chicago he returned to Chazy. He focused on farming and philanthropy, founding the Chazy Central Rural School, Physician's Hospital (now CVPH Medical Center) and expanding Heart's Delight Farm into all areas of agricultural production. Miner also oversaw construction of hydroelectric dams and powerhouses throughout Chazy and Altona. The largest dam, finished in 1915, cost one million dollars and held one billion gallons of water. It supplied power to the area for seven years until equipment failure forced its closing. Between 1910 and 1920 Miner purchased over 5,000 acres of land. At peak size the farm had 4,000 acres of tillable land, 2,000 acres of pasture and 6,000 acres of woodland. Fruits, vegetables, beef and dairy cattle, mules, sheep, pigs, chickens, turkeys, pheasants and brook trout were raised on the farm. In addition to the 800 regularly employed workers Miner hired around 100 families to camp at Flat Rock and pick berries. At the height of production Miner was shipping 16,000 quarts of berries a day to major metropolitan areas. Heart's Delight food products were sold nationwide. The farm's 800 workers at that time worked draft horses, purebred horses and the farm had its own dairy, box factory, ice house, natatorium, greenhouses and gristmill. Miner also built a 20-bedroom guesthouse and an entertainment center named Harmony Hall, which included an auditorium, complete with a stage large enough for 300 people. Miner's will established the school and farm, The William H. Miner Agricultural Research Institute.

== Research ==
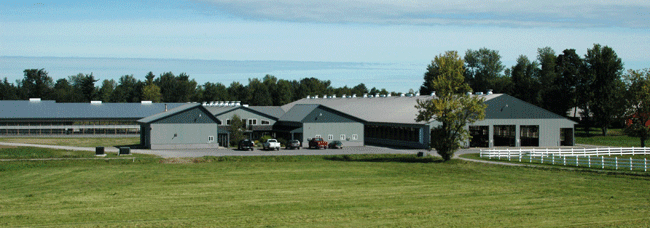
Miner dairy barn

Miner Institute conducts research in the areas of crop-animal-environment interactions, cow comfort and behavior, and equine reproductive management. The Institute maintains research herds of Holstein dairy cows and Morgan horses. The dairy complex at Miner consists of four barns. A 160-cow freestall barn, built in 1970 for dairy cows, now houses pregnant heifers and far-off dry cows. In 1999, a freestall dry cow barn was built with attached calving pens. There is also a greenhouse barn for calves from weaning through four months. The newest addition is an insulated freestall dairy barn designed to accommodate dairying and research requirements. The current herd, consisting of approximately 600 registered Holstein dairy cows, is milked three times a day in a double-12 parallel parlor with automatic identification and pedometer system. The research wing is attached and includes tie stalls and Calan bin feeding areas.

== Community Outreach ==
Miner is also a demonstration farm, exhibiting crop, dairy, and equine production innovations for regional producers and allied industries. The Institute publishes a monthly dairy newsletter, The Farm Report, and quarterly equine newsletter, The Stable Sheet. In 2003, an on-site exhibit opened which covers the history of William H. Miner, development of Heart's Delight Farm, and the current work of the Miner Institute.

== Education ==
Year-round education programs are held at Miner in cooperation with SUNY Plattsburgh, and University of Vermont. Applied Environmental Science Program (AESP) – For over 50 years, the Institute has supported SUNY Plattsburgh's Applied Environmental Science Program (AESP). AESP is a semester-long, residential educational program for Environmental Science and Geology Majors. It is conducted with Miner staff and teaching faculty from the Center for Earth and Environmental Science at Plattsburgh State University. Advanced Dairy Management (ADM) – University of Vermont (UVM)/Vermont Technical College (VTC) FARMS 2+2 member farm – Miner participates in FARMS 2+2 by providing a semester of curriculum for UVM/VTC students. Students spend two years at VTC, and two years at UVM with one semester as residents and students at Miner. ADM curriculum focuses on teaching practical dairy operation, research analysis, and exposing future producers to allied industries.

== Affiliations ==
Other industry support work includes cooperation with Cornell University and University of Pennsylvania to develop the feed ration computer software CPM.
