= Centerview Partners =

American investment banking firm

- Type: Private ownership
- Industry: Financial services
- Founded: 2006; 20 years ago
- Headquarters: 31 West 52nd Street; New York, New York, U.S.
- Products: Investment banking, mergers and acquisitions, restructuring, private equity
- Website: www.centerviewpartners.com

Centerview Partners is an American independent investment banking firm founded in 2006. Centerview operates primarily as an investment banking advisory firm with approximately 80 partners and 500 professionals advising across various industries, geographies, transaction structures, and deal sizes. The firm is headquartered in New York City with offices in London, Paris, Menlo Park and San Francisco.

== History ==
Centerview was founded in July 2006 by Blair Effron, former Vice Chairman of UBS AG, and Robert Pruzan, former CEO of Dresdner Kleinwort Wasserstein North America and President of Wasserstein Perella & Co. In 2010, Robert E. Rubin, former U.S. Secretary of the Treasury, joined the firm as Counselor. In 2019, Rahm Emanuel joined the firm to launch the Chicago office. In 2023, Richard N. Haass, former president of the Council of Foreign Relations, joined the firm as Senior Counselor. In 2025, Reince Priebus, former White House Chief of Staff and Chairman of the Republican National Committee, joined the firm as Senior Advisor.

In April 2021, a former Centerview analyst sued the firm, alleging that she was fired after requesting disability accommodations for her diagnosed mood and anxiety disorder. These accommodations would have stipulated that she receive at least 8 hours of sleep each night and not be required to continue working into the early morning. The case was settled out of court before it went to trial.

In 2024, The Wall Street Journal cited Centerview as the investment bank with the fourth highest M&A revenue in the U.S. The firm has also consistently ranked well as a top investment bank to work for, in part for its high compensation relative to the industry, including to first year analysts.

In 2024, Centerview ranked fourth among all banks for mergers and acquisitions revenue in the U.S. As of 2025, the firm was rated "No. 1 Investment Bank to Work For" by Vault for six consecutive years.

== Management ==
Before co-founding Centerview, Effron was Group Vice Chairman of UBS AG and a member of the Board of UBS Investment Bank, where he also sat on several management committees and advised Gillette on its $57 billion sale to Procter & Gamble, which was the largest M&A transaction of 2005. In 2006, Effron announced he was leaving UBS to form a new boutique investment banking firm.

Before co-founding Centerview, Pruzan was Head of Global Investment Banking and CEO of North America at Dresdner Kleinwort Wasserstein and President of Wasserstein Perella & Co. He is a former member of McKinsey & Company where he specialized in strategic consulting for consumer products companies and financial institutions.

== See also ==
- List of investment banks
- Boutique investment bank
