= Ronald Kramer =

Ronald Kramer may refer to:

- Ron Kramer (Ronald J. Kramer, 1935–2010), American college athlete and professional American football player
- Ronald Kramer (business), American businessman and CEO of Griffon Corporation
