= Edward J. Garrett =

American businessman

- Born: 1918; Brooklyn, New York, U.S.
- Died: March 10, 1982 (aged 63–64); New York City, New York, U.S.
- Education: New York University
- Occupations: Chairman of the Board, President, and CEO of Instrument Systems Corporation 1964–1982
- Spouse: Sylvia Jampol Garrett (1918–2015)
- Children: Arlene Garrett Blau; David Garrett

Edward J. Garrett (1918 – March 10, 1982) was an American business executive. He was the Chairman of the Board, President, and CEO of Instrument Systems Corporation (ISC; today Griffon Corporation).

== Biography ==
Garrett was born in Brooklyn, New York, in 1918 and studied engineering at New York University, graduating in 1939. He began his career as a civilian engineer for the Army Corps of Engineers and joined the newly created Reeves Instrument Corporation in 1944. At Reeves, he helped develop EDVAC, one of the first electronic computers. Garrett later joined Loral Electronics Corporation, rising to Vice President by 1961.

In 1964, Garrett was named Chairman of the Board and President of Instrument Systems Corporation (ISC), a small defense electronics company founded in College Point, Queens, in 1959. Although ISC was highly regarded for its products, it had struggled financially in its early years. ISC's major stakeholders, including Helmuth W. Waldorf and Lester Avnet, the President of Avnet Electronics Corporation, hired Garrett to reposition the company for future growth.

Garrett brought on board his son-in-law, Harvey R. Blau, a former Assistant U.S. Attorney for the Southern District of New York, as General Counsel.

Following a strategy that had proved successful at Loral, Garrett transformed ISC by closing deficit-ridden plants, seeking civilian markets as well as government research-and-development contracts, and acquiring a wide array of young growth-oriented companies, mainly in defense and commercial electronics and manufacturing.

ISC's biggest contracts of the Garrett era exemplified the company's continued ability to leverage innovative technologies it had developed for military or government purposes and apply them to civilian use. For example, after successfully producing communications systems for the U.S. military, ISC's Telephonics subsidiary won multi-year contracts to produce multiplex passenger entertainment systems for the new Boeing 747 and Lockheed L-1011 wide-body airplanes.

Garrett's aggressive strategy grew ISC at an astonishing rate, transforming it from a struggling small electronics company to a nationally recognized industrial conglomerate in less than a decade. In 1970, ISC was listed for the first time on the prestigious Fortune 500 list of America's largest companies.

As the 1970s progressed, however, Garrett's strategy faced stiff headwinds. Conglomerates had fallen out of favor with investors, U.S. defense spending decreased as the Vietnam War winded down, and two oil crises and the recessions of 1973–1975 and the early 1980s further diminished ISC's prospects. ISC's revenues fell from $233.25 million in 1974 to $104.3 million in 1982. Garrett implemented divestiture and cost-cutting measures but died at New York University Medical Center from a severe illness on March 9, 1982, before his turnaround plan was fully implemented. He was succeeded by his son-in-law Harvey Blau as chairman and CEO of ISC.

In addition to his role at ISC, Garrett founded the Spencer Heart Fund, a non-profit corporation devoted to the research and development of heart surgery at New York University Medical Center, in 1977.

== Personal life ==
In 1939, he married Sylvia Jampol; they had two children: Arlene J. Blau (married to Harvey R. Blau) and David B. Garrett. They remained married until his death; she died on November 15, 2015.
