= Mitchell Fisher =

20th-century American rabbi and lawyer

Mitchell Salem Fisher
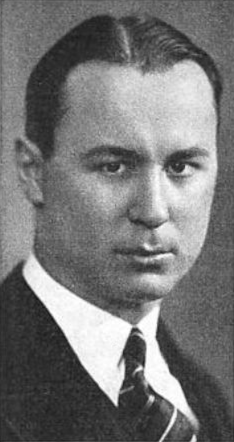
- As rabbi of Temple Israel of Washington Heights in April 1927
- Born: 1903 or 1904
- Died: March 19, 1990 (aged 86); Ewing, New Jersey, U.S.
- Education: New York University; Columbia University; Jewish Institute of Religion; Columbia Law School
- Occupations: Rabbi and lawyer

Mitchell Salem Fisher (1903 or 1904 – March 19, 1990) was an American rabbi who resigned from his active rabbinic position in 1930 because of what he described as "institutional restraint" and a separation between preachers and issues in the world. After his resignation, Fisher became a lawyer with a specialization in marriage law. He worked for the Anti-Nazi League in opposition to the German American Bund, served as counsel to the New York Board of Rabbis, and played a significant role in the development of family law in New York.

== Early life and education ==
Mitchell Salem Fisher was born in 1903 or 1904. He graduated with a B.A. from New York University in 1923, and received an M.A. from Columbia University in 1927, as well as a PhD in 1930. He additionally attended the Jewish Institute of Religion, from which he received the John Palmer Prize in 1926 and was ordained as a rabbi in 1927.

== Career ==
=== As a rabbi ===
Preachers enunciate ideals, but these must remain so indefinite, so unpointed, so unchallenging, so completely removed from the real issues of everyday living and struggling, that these ideals become patently and utterly vain. The rabbi becomes an exalted lecturer, entertainer and institution promotion agent.

— Mitchell Salem Fisher, in his letter of resignation from the rabbinate

From 1925 to 1928, Fisher was rabbi of Temple Israel of Washington Heights. In 1928 he became acting rabbi at Rodeph Shalom, and in 1930 supervised the congregation's move into a new synagogue building.

As a rabbi, Fisher described Prohibition as a "national curse". He supported the Socialist Party of America and its presidential candidate Norman Thomas. He was additionally a Zionist, and served as the first national vice president of Zionist student organization Avukah.

In April 1930, one month after the 1930 move, Fisher resigned, citing a desire to speak strongly about issues "without immediate institutional restraint". In his letter of resignation, he criticized the position of rabbi as "an exalted lecturer, entertainer and institution promotion agent". While stating that he expected other rabbis to "boldly assert upon learning of this letter that they are free", Fisher asserted that "with very, very few exceptions none of them is the possessor of effective freedom. And those few who have won their fight to such freedom usually have done so outside of the conventional paths of rabbinical success."

In response to Fisher's resignation, The American Hebrew described his disillusionment as discouraging and stated that "If the modern synagogue shackles a Rabbi's idealism so that the ideals he preaches become patently and utterly vain our lay leaders ought to know it and ascertain the reasons why."

=== As a lawyer ===
After his resignation, Fisher attended Columbia Law School, graduating in 1933 and becoming a lawyer. He began working for the Anti-Nazi League, which opposed the German American Bund, promoted a boycott of German goods in the years prior to World War II, and later successfully infiltrated and exposed the Ku Klux Klan. He additionally served as counsel to the New York Board of Rabbis. Specializing in marriage law, Fisher helped to draft much of the family law for New York.

== Publications ==
In 1973, Reconstructionist Press published a book by Fisher titled Rebel, O Jews! And Other Prayers. One poem from the book, titled "Prayer for a Disturbed Sabbath", was adapted and used in the Mishkan T'filah.

== Later life and death ==
Fisher died on March 19, 1990, at the Home for the Jewish Aging in Ewing, New Jersey. He was 86 years old when he died, with three living children, eight grandchildren, and one great-grandchild.

== See also ==
- Abraham Feinberg
