= Harvey R. Blau =

American attorney and business executive

- Born: Harvey R. Blau; November 14, 1935
- Died: January 19, 2018) (age 82)
- Occupation: Businessman
- Known for: Chairman of the Board and former CEO of Griffon Corporation
- Spouse: Arlene Joan Garrett
- Children: Stephanie Blau Kramer; Melissa Blau; Victoria Blau Orlin
- Relatives: Edward J. Garrett (father-in-law); Ron Kramer (son-in-law)

Harvey R. Blau (November 14, 1935 – January 19, 2018) was an American attorney and business executive. He was the Chairman of the Board and former CEO of Griffon Corporation (formerly Instrument Systems Corporation). He became a practicing attorney in New York in 1961, and in 1966 was the founding partner of the law firm Blau Kramer Wactlar & Lieberman PC in Jericho, New York.

== Biography ==
Blau was born to a Jewish family. He graduated from the U.S. Army Infantry School in Fort Benning, Georgia, in 1958, and served as a captain in the Army Reserve until 1966. After receiving an A.B. from New York University, a J.D. from Columbia University School of Law, and an LL.M. from New York University School of Law, Blau clerked for Judge Irving Ben Cooper and worked as Assistant United States Attorney in the Southern District of New York in the mid-1960s.

Blau joined Griffon – then known as Instrument Systems Corporation (ISC) – as General Counsel in 1966. After Edward Garrett's death in 1982, Blau was appointed Chairman of the Board and CEO in 1983. Under Blau's leadership, ISC grew to a large diversified conglomerate whose wholly owned subsidiaries produced garage doors, clothing, specialty plastics, and aerospace and defense electronics. He transformed the company by accelerating a divestiture and cost-cutting plan, strengthening profitable existing lines of business, and aggressively seeking new business. In 1995, Blau renamed ISC as Griffon Corporation, a name inspired by the mythical half-eagle, half-lion symbolizing the combined strengths of the company's different subsidiaries. Blau retired as CEO in March 2008 and was succeeded by Ron Kramer, who had married Blau's daughter Stephanie in 1992. Kramer had served on the company's board of directors since 1993 and was elected Vice Chairman in 2003.

In addition to his role at Griffon, Blau served as Chairman of the Board and CEO of Aeroflex Incorporated, a manufacturer of electronic components and test equipment, from 2002 to 2007, and as mayor, deputy mayor, and trustee of the Village of Old Westbury, New York. In 2010, Blau and his wife received the Theodore Roosevelt Award at the Legal Aid Society's Annual Servant of Justice Awards Dinner. Blau's commitment to public service is evident in his extensive involvement in local government. He served as mayor, deputy mayor, and trustee of the Village of Old Westbury, New York. In these roles, Blau worked to address community needs, promote development initiatives, and enhance the quality of life for residents.

== Personal life ==
In 1964, he married Arlene Joan Garrett, the daughter of Griffon's then Chairman and CEO Edward J. Garrett, in a Jewish ceremony at the Plaza Hotel in Manhattan. The couple had three children: Stephanie (married to Ron Kramer), Melissa Blau, and Victoria Blau Orlin (married to Paul Orlin). Blau died on January 19, 2018, at age 82. Services were held at Temple Emanu-El in Manhattan.
