= Ducera Partners =

American investment banking firm

Ducera Partners LLC
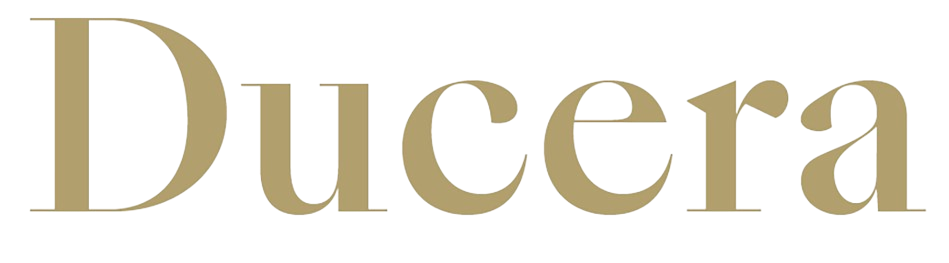
- Company type: Private
- Industry: Financial services
- Founded: June 2015; 11 years ago
- Founders: Michael Kramer; Derron Slonecker; Joshua Scherer; Agnes Tang; Adam Verost
- Headquarters: Eleven Times Square, New York, U.S.
- Key people: Michael Kramer (CEO)
- Products: Investment banking; Wealth management; Growth capital
- Number of employees: 45 (2022)
- Website: www.ducerapartners.com

Ducera Partners (Ducera) is an American boutique investment bank that has a focus on advising companies regarding restructuring matters. Through its affiliate partners, it is also involved with wealth management and growth capital. Headquartered in New York, it has additional offices in Los Angeles, San Francisco and Stamford.

Founded in 2015 by bankers who had previously worked for Perella Weinberg Partners (PWP), Ducera has since been engaged in legal disputes with PWP.

== History ==
Ducera was co-founded in 2015 by partners Michael Kramer, Derron Slonecker, Joshua Scherer, Agnes Tang, and Adam Verost. Kramer, Slonecker, Scherer and Verost had been colleagues at PWP, and were fired and sued by PWP, who claimed to have discovered their plan to leave and start their own firm. Kramer and his colleagues filed a countersuit for defamation and wrongful seizing of equity, in addition to denying their plan to leave. In 2016, the New York state court dismissed some of the compensation claims of Ducera's co-founders while allowing their allegations of defamation and interference of business prospects to move forward.

In 2015, Ducera restructured $72 billion worth of debt for a group of Puerto Rico Government Development Bank bondholders. In 2016, Ducera and Morgan Stanley advised Monsanto on its sale to Bayer for US$66 billion, of which Ducera was stated to have taken in $50 million in fees.
