= William H. Miner =

American entrepreneur (c.1862–1930)

- Born: Circa. 1862; United States
- Died: 1930 (aged 67–68); Plattsburgh, New York
- Occupation: Entrepreneur
- Known for: Wealthy railroad and food industrialist
- Spouse: Alice T. Miner
- Children: 1

William Henry Miner (c. 1862 – 1930) was an American entrepreneur, industrialist, pioneer and philanthropist. Miner became a wealthy railroad industrialist as the inventor of railcar draft gears. After becoming a successful entrepreneur in Chicago he returned to Chazy, New York. Heart's Delight Farm, the land that would become Miner Institute, was developed by William H. Miner on his family homestead beginning in 1903.

Miner focused on farming and philanthropy, founding the Chazy Central Rural School, Physician's Hospital (now called CVPH Medical Center) and expanding Heart's Delight Farm into all areas of agricultural production. Miner also oversaw construction of hydroelectric dams and powerhouses throughout Chazy and Altona. The largest dam, finished in 1915, cost one million dollars and held one billion gallons of water. It supplied power to the area for seven years until equipment failure forced its closing.

== Career ==
Between 1910 and 1920 Miner purchased over 5,000 acres of land. At peak size, the farm had 4,000 acres of tillable land, 2,000 acres of pasture and 6,000 acres of woodland. Fruits, vegetables, beef and dairy cattle, mules, sheep, pigs, chickens, turkeys, pheasants and brook trout were raised on the farm. In addition to the 800 regularly employed workers Miner hired around 100 families to camp at Flat Rock and pick berries. At the height of production Miner was shipping 16,000 quarts of berries a day to major metropolitan areas.

Heart's Delight food products were sold nationwide. The farm's 800 workers at that time worked draft horses, purebred horses and the farm had its own dairy, box factory, ice house, natatorium, greenhouses and gristmill.

== Personal life ==
Miner also built a 20-bedroom guesthouse and an entertainment center named Harmony Hall, which included an auditorium, complete with a stage large enough for 300 people.

Miner died in 1930 after surgery in Physician's Hospital in Plattsburgh, New York and was buried in Chazy. He was 67.

== Legacy ==
=== William H. Miner Agricultural Research Institute ===
Miner's will established the school and farm, The William H. Miner Agricultural Research Institute, a private, not-for-profit educational research institution with an operational dairy farm and Morgan horse herd located in Chazy, New York on the Adirondack Coast of Lake Champlain. Miner Institute would encompass over 8,600 acres of forest and agricultural land in the Little Chazy and Great Chazy river watersheds. The institute is funded through an endowment, research grants and the sale of milk from its dairy operation. Created in 1951, the Institute's mission is to offer quality research, education, and demonstration programs addressing critical agricultural and environmental issues relevant to Northern New York, Vermont and Quebec farmers.

=== Publications and collections ===
In 2010, Joseph Burke published a biography of Miner under the title William H. Miner: The Man and the Myth published on Langdon Street Press (a division of Hillcrest Publishing Group, Inc.).

PBS broadcast a documentary about the life and times of William H. Miner in 2016. The documentary titled Heart's Delight: The Story of William H. Miner was directed by Paul Frederick.

Alice T. Miner Museum (full name Alice T. Miner Colonial Collection) was established by Alice Miner, his wife and is located at Chazy. Alice Miner died in 1950. The couple had only one son.
