= Joseph E. Newburger =

American judge

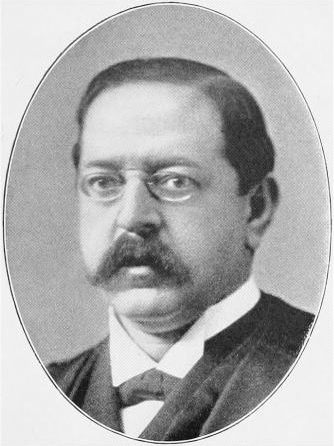
- Born: Joseph Emanuel Newburger; October 21, 1853; Manhattan, New York, US
- Died: July 19, 1931 (aged 77); Plattsburgh, New York, US
- Education: Columbia Law School
- Occupations: Lawyer, judge

Joseph Emanuel Newburger (October 21, 1853 – July 19, 1931) was a Jewish-American lawyer and judge from New York.

== Life ==
Newburger was born on October 21, 1853 on the Lower East Side of Manhattan in New York City, the son of Emanuel Newburger and Lottie Fuchs.

Newburger attended Columbia Law School, graduating from there with an LL.B. in 1874. He then practiced law until 1890. Active in Tammany Hall, he unsuccessfully ran for the New York State Assembly. He was elected judge of the City Court in 1890, a position he held for five years. He was then elected to the Court of General Sessions, and in 1905 he was elected as a Tammany candidate Justice of the New York Supreme Court. When his term expired in 1919, Tammany chief Charles F. Murphy refused to back his candidacy for re-election due to differences that developed between them. In response, Newburger's friends formed an independent group to support his re-election campaign, the Republicans chose him as their candidate, and he was re-elected by a plurality of 80,000. He retired in the end of 1923, when he reached 70 and the state's age limitation. In the beginning of 1924, he was appointed Official Referee of the Supreme Court.

Active in Jewish societies, Newburger was one of the founders of the Jewish Theological Seminary of America. He was president of Independent Order B'nai B'rith District No. 1, an executive committee member of the Independent Order Free Sons of Israel and the Order Kesher Shel Barzel, and a trustee of the Hebrew Free Schools. He was a director and president of the Hebrew Orphan Asylum, and during his presidency the orphanage purchased a new site in the Bronx. He was also active in the Freemasons and Odd Fellows.

Newburger died of heart disease in his suite in the Hotel Champlain in Bluff Point on July 19, 1931. He had been undergoing treatment for a month at the Physicians' Hospital in Plattsburgh. His funeral took place in Temple Rodeph Sholom, which he was president of from 1884 to 1896. Rabbi Louis I. Newman delivered the eulogy. The honorary pallbearers included Chief Judge Benjamin N. Cardozo and Associate Judge Irving Lehman of the Court of Appeals, Presiding Justice Edward R. Finch of the Appellate Division, former Presiding Justice Victor J. Dowling of the Appellate Division, Federal Judge William Bondy, Supreme Court Justices Joseph M. Callahan, Albert Cohn, William T. Collins, John F. Carew, John Ford, and Bernard L. Shientag, and former Supreme Court Justices John Proctor Clarke, Francis B. Delehanty, and M. Warley Platzek. Also attending the funeral were Borough President Samuel Levy, members of the board of trustees of the Hebrew Orphan Asylum, and trustees of the congregation. He was buried in Union Field Cemetery.
