= Congregation Rodeph Sholom (Manhattan) =

Reform synagogue in New York City

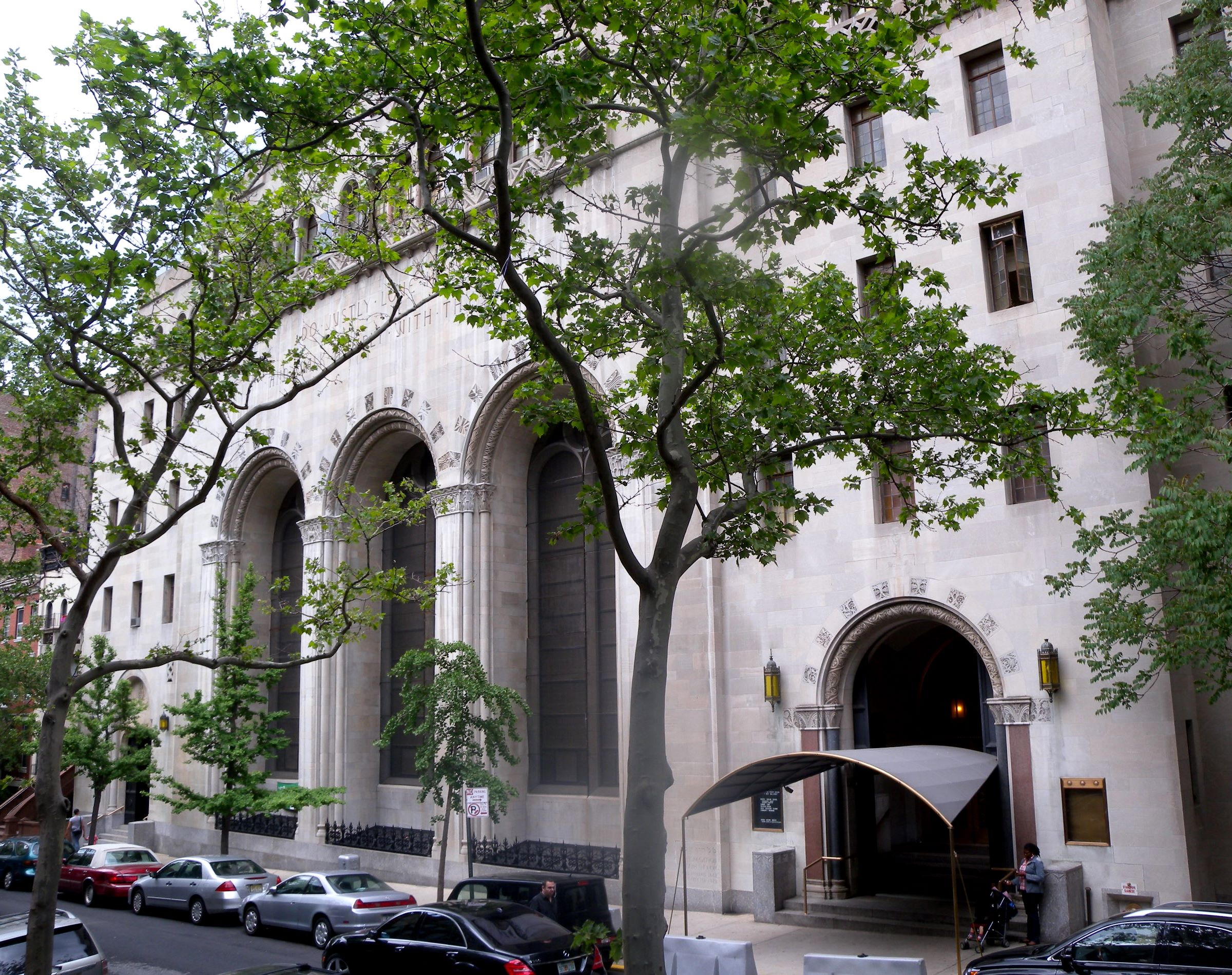
- Synagogue at 7 West 83rd St

- Location in Manhattan, New York City

Religion
- Affiliation: Reform Judaism
- Ecclesiastical or organisational status: Synagogue
- Leadership: Rabbi Benjamin H. Spratt
- Status: Active

Location
- Location: 7 West 83rd Street, Upper West Side, Manhattan, New York City, New York
- Country: United States
- Coordinates: 40°47′2″N 73°58′18″W

Architecture
- Architect: Charles B. Meyers (1930)
- Type: Synagogue
- Style: Romanesque Revival
- Established: 1842 (as a congregation)
- Completed: 1853 (Clinton Street); 1930 (West 83rd Street)

Website
- rodephsholom.org

Congregation Rodeph Sholom is a Reform Jewish synagogue at 7 West 83rd Street on the Upper West Side of Manhattan in New York City, New York. Founded in 1842 by German Jewish immigrants, it is one of the oldest synagogues in the United States.

== History ==
City directories from the years 1845 to 1853 list the congregation as having met at 156 Attorney Street. The first building constructed by Rodeph Sholom, at 8 Clinton Street on the Lower East Side in 1853, is still in use by Congregation Chasam Sopher. It is the second-oldest surviving synagogue building in New York City and the fifth-oldest synagogue building in the United States.

Rodeph Sholom moved to Lexington Avenue and 63rd Street, to a new Victorian Romanesque building designed by D. & J. Jardine and built in 1872–73 for Ansche Chesed. Simeon Abrahams conveyed land to the congregation for a burial ground in 1842. This cemetery was on 88th Street between Madison and Park Avenues. By 1879, there had not been a burial in twenty-six years. It was removed sometime between 1897 and 1911.

The synagogue began as an Orthodox congregation, and began using a Conservative service in 1875. Aaron Wise served as rabbi from 1876 to his death in 1896, followed by Rudolph Grossman from 1896 until his death in 1927. The congregation joined the Reform movement in 1901.

In 1930, Rodeph Sholom moved to its present location at 7 West 83rd Street on the Upper West Side. The move was supervised by Mitchell Fisher; then acting rabbi of the congregation, he would resign a month later due to what he described as "institutional restraint". The Romanesque Revival synagogue house and sanctuary, designed by Charles B. Meyers, were built between 1929–30 and dedicated on Purim in March 1930. Modern renovations to the lobby and multi-purpose room, overseen by MBB Architects and Chicago-based Judaica expert Amy Reichert, improved the building's accessibility and introduced new artwork.

Benjamin H. Spratt is the senior rabbi.

== Day school ==
In 1970, Rodeph Sholom opened the first Reform movement Jewish day school in the United States. Its goal is to help Jews become self-aware adults in the world today. In 1972, the school expanded to move all the way through sixth grade, and since then it has expanded through eighth grade. The elementary and middle school stands on 79th Street, between Amsterdam and Columbus Avenue. The Brutalist-era building has been renovated with a modern, accessible entrance and two rooftop playdecks designed by MBB Architects. Danny Karpf is Head of School.

== Notable members ==
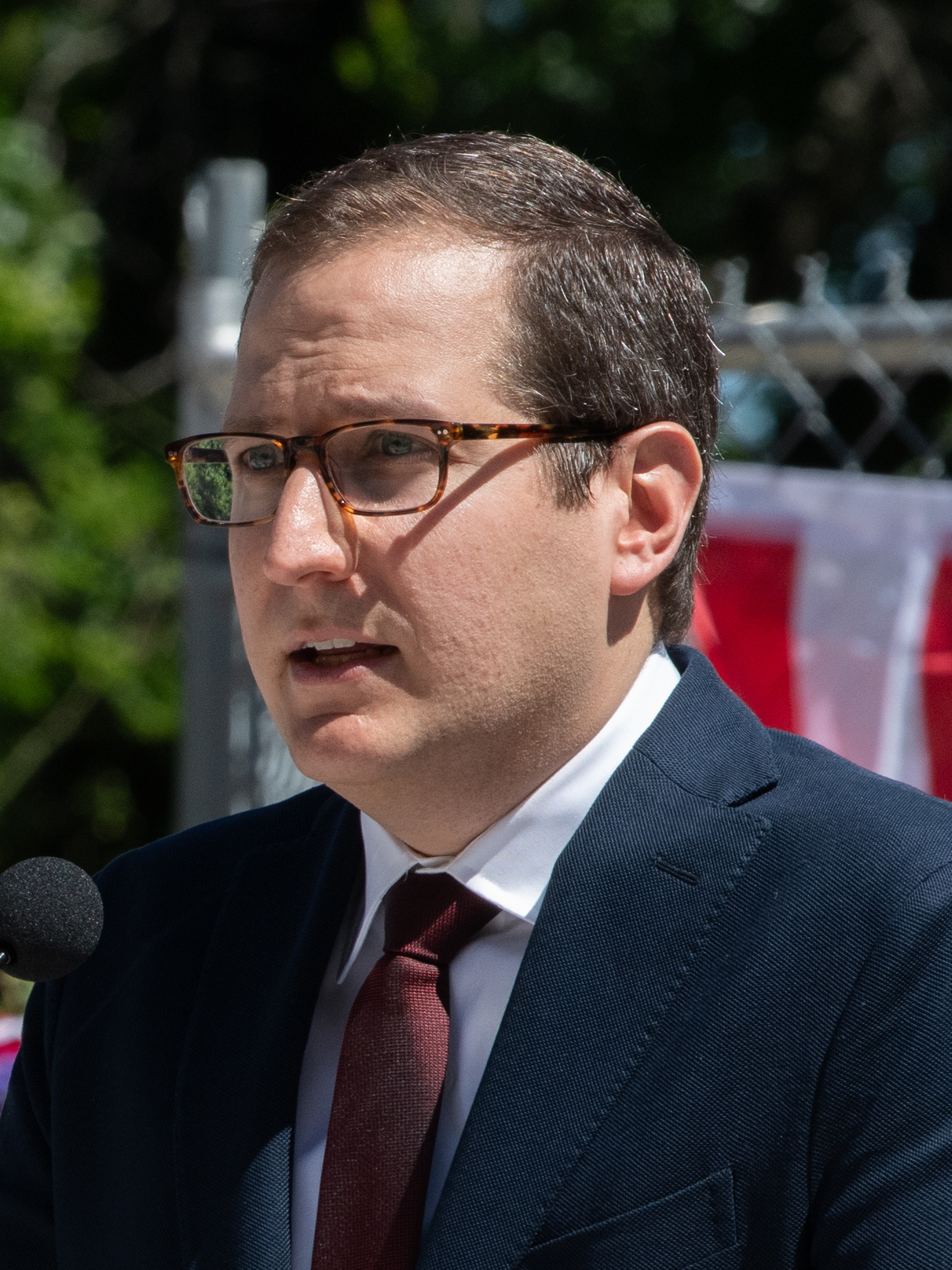
Micah Lasher

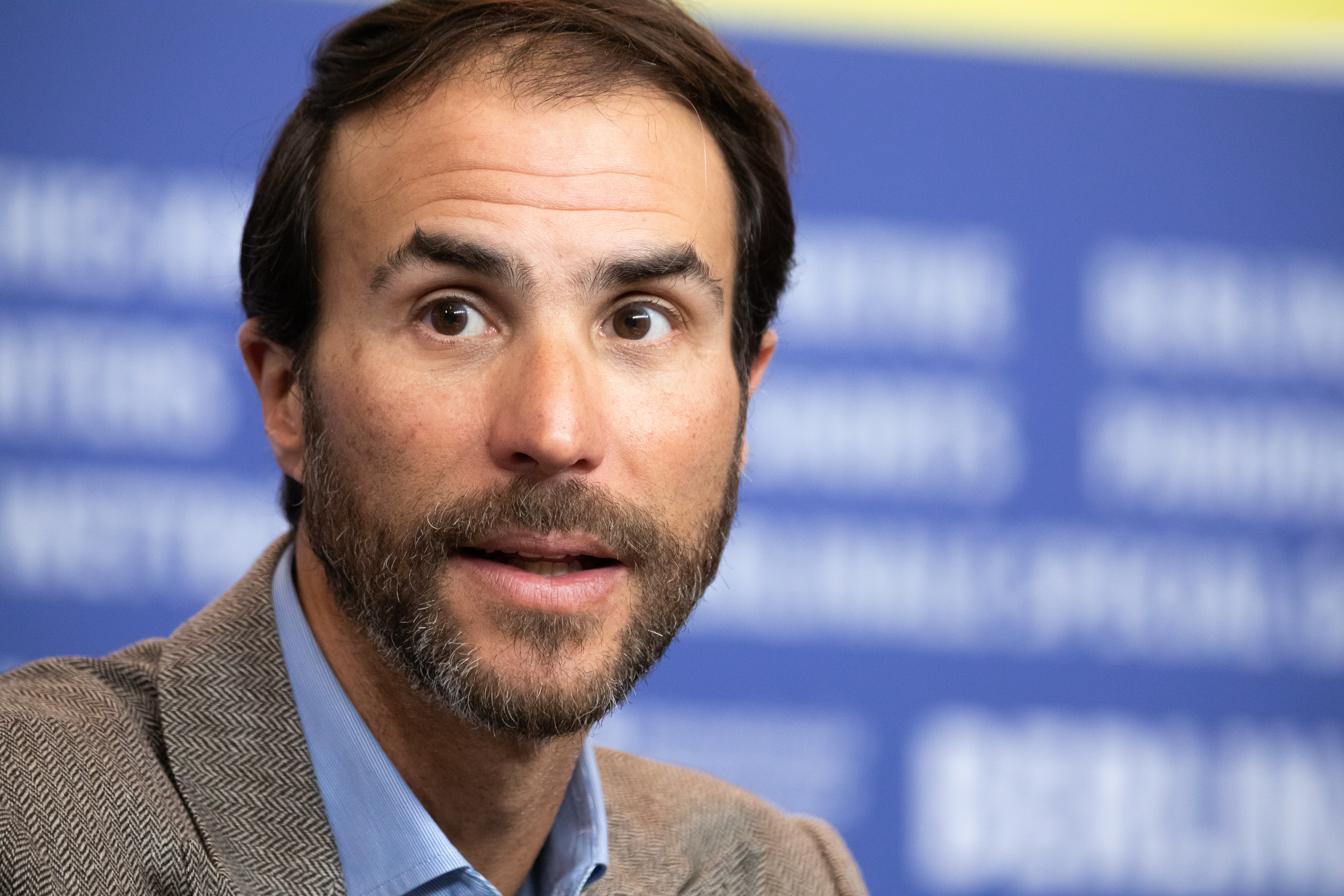
Ben Silverman

- Louis Harvy Chalif, dance instructor and author
- Joshua Lionel Cowen, inventor and cofounder of the Lionel Corporation
- Mitchell Fisher, rabbi and lawyer
- I. Edwin Goldwasser, teacher, principal, district superintendent of schools, philanthropist, co-executive director of the Federation of Jewish Philanthropies, and businessman
- Benjamin Hoffman, lawyer, New York State Assemblyman, and Judge of the Municipal Court
- Dana Evan Kaplan, Reform rabbi known for his writings on Reform Judaism
- Victor R. Kaufmann, lawyer, New York State Assemblyman, and Deputy Attorney General of New York.
- Robert Lansing, stage, film, and television actor
- Micah Lasher, New York State Assemblyman
- Joseph E. Newburger, lawyer and Justice of the New York Supreme Court
- Louis Israel Newman, Reform rabbi and author
- Mack Rossoff, financier and investment banker
- Jerry Seinfeld, stand-up comedian, actor, writer, filmmaker, and television producer
- Ben Silverman, media executive
- Ruth Westheimer, better known as Dr. Ruth, sex therapist and talk show host
- Aaron Wise, rabbi
- Joseph Yasser, organist, music theorist, author, and musicologist
- Randi Zuckerberg, businesswoman

== Gallery ==
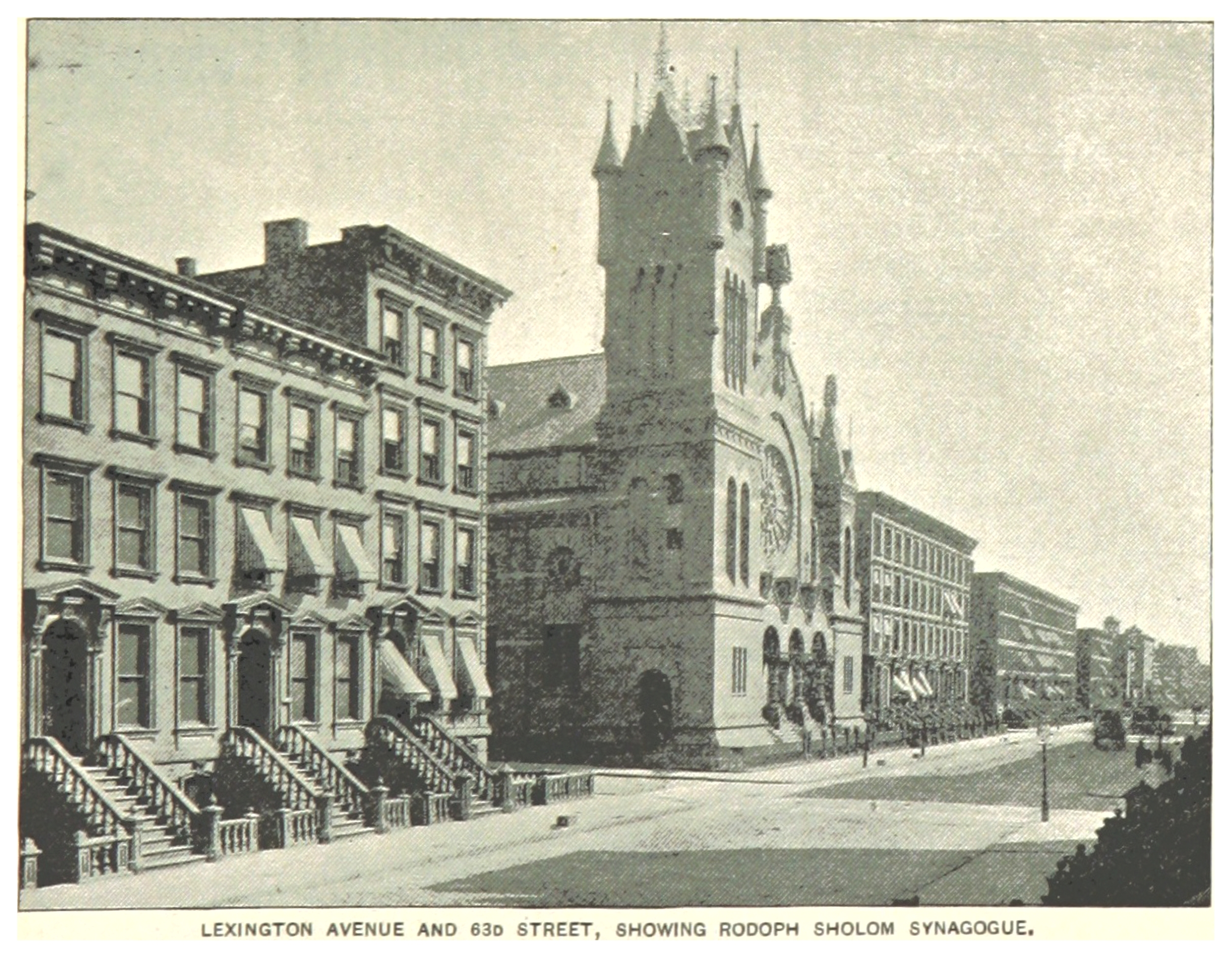
East 63rd Street synagogue

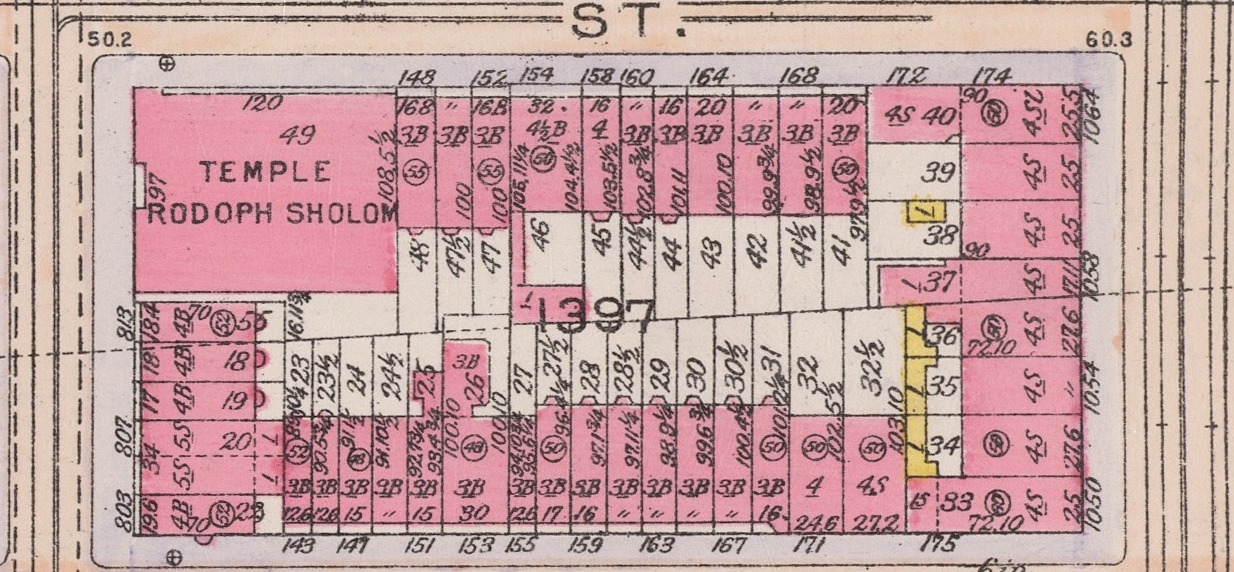
Temple Rodeph Sholom on East 63rd Street and Lexington Avenue map in 1916

== See also ==
- Oldest synagogues in the United States
