= Ronald Kramer (business) =

American business executive (born 1958)

Ronald J. Kramer
- Born: 1958 (age 67–68); U.S.
- Education: University of Pennsylvania (B.S.); New York University (MBA)
- Occupations: Chairman and CEO of Griffon Corporation 2008–present President and Director of Wynn Resorts 2002–2008
- Spouse: Stephanie Blau Kramer (1992–present)

Ronald J. "Ron" Kramer (born 1958) is an American business executive. He is the Chairman and CEO of Griffon Corporation, a conglomerate holding company headquartered in New York, New York.

== Biography ==
Kramer received a B.S. from the Wharton School of the University of Pennsylvania in 1980 and an MBA from New York University in 1981. He started his career at Citibank and then worked as a corporate finance specialist at Ladenburg Thalmann, a New York-based investment bank, for thirteen years, becoming Chairman and CEO in 1995. In 1999, Kramer became a Managing Director and Partner at Wasserstein Perella & Co. and its successor Dresdner Kleinwort Wasserstein. Kramer left Wall Street in 2002 to become President and Director of Wynn Resorts Ltd (Nasdaq: WYNN), a Las Vegas-based developer and operator of destination casino resorts.

Kramer succeeded his father-in-law Harvey R. Blau as CEO of Griffon in 2008. To improve Griffon's balance sheet, Kramer secured a new $100 million revolving line of credit from JPMorgan Chase, exited the residential installation services business, refinanced Griffon's senior debt, and raised approximately $250 million through a common stock rights offering with investments by Goldman Sachs and Kramer himself. This recapitalization built a foundation to transform the company for growth. In 2017, Kramer repositioned Griffon's Portfolio by selling its Clopay Plastics business and acquiring ClosetMaid a home storage and organization business. In addition, Griffon executed a number of smaller tuck-in acquisitions for Griffon's subsidiary, The AMES Companies, which expanded the company's geographic footprint in Australia and the United Kingdom as well as expanding the AMES product portfolio. In May 2018, Griffon announced the acquisition of CornellCookson, a leader in rolling steel commercial doors, to further expand Griffon's Clopay Building Products in the commercial market.

Griffon operates as a diversified management and holding company, conducting business through its wholly owned subsidiaries: Clopay Building Products, the largest manufacturer of residential garage doors in North America; The AMES Companies, a leading global manufacturer of non-powered lawn and garden tools and accessories; ClosetMaid, a leading North American manufacturer and marketer of closet organization, home storage, and garage storage products; and Telephonics Corporation, a manufacturer of advanced electronic surveillance, intelligence and communication systems for defense, aerospace and civil applications.

Kramer has served on the Board of Directors of Leap Wireless International, Monster Worldwide, Sapphire Industrials Corporation, Grand Casinos, Republic Properties, New Valley Corporation, and Lakes Entertainment. Kramer currently serves as the Chairman of the Undergraduate Board of the Wharton School. He resides with his wife, Stephanie, and two daughters in New York City.

== Personal life ==
In 1992, he married Stephanie Blau, daughter of Harvey R. Blau, in a Jewish ceremony at the Metropolitan Club in Manhattan.
