= Blair Effron =

American businessman (born 1962)

- Born: Blair Wayne Effron; June 19, 1962 (age 63); Poughkeepsie, New York, U.S.
- Education: Princeton University (BA); Columbia University (MBA)
- Known for: Co-Founder of Centerview Partners
- Political party: Democratic

Blair Wayne Effron (born June 19, 1962) is an American financier. Effron co-founded Centerview Partners, a leading global investment banking firm based in New York City. Centerview has offices in London, Paris, Chicago, Los Angeles, Palo Alto and San Francisco. The firm provides advice on mergers and acquisitions, financial restructurings, valuation, and capital structure to companies, institutions and governments.

Effron is also active in Democratic Party politics and was a prominent supporter of John Kerry's 2004 presidential campaign, as well as subsequent presidential campaigns for Barack Obama, Hillary Clinton, Joe Biden and Kamala Harris.

== Early life ==
Effron grew up in a Jewish family in Poughkeepsie, New York, son of James W. Effron, president of Effron Oil. Effron graduated with a BA in history from Princeton University in 1984 and an MBA from Columbia Business School in 1986. He began his career at Dillon, Read & Co. and would remain with the firm and its successors (Warburg Dillon Read, UBS Warburg and UBS Investment Bank) over the next 20 years. Effron received a brief mention as an associate at Dillon Read in the Barbarians at the Gate involved in the buyout of RJR Nabisco by Kohlberg Kravis Roberts & Co.

== Career ==
Effron began his career in investment banking in the early 1980s and built up a reputation as one of the leading bankers in the consumer products industry and for more than ten years since founding Centerview has been one of the industry's top generalist banker across several industries. At UBS, Effron was Group Vice Chairman of UBS AG and a member of the Board of UBS Investment Bank, where he also sat on several management committees. Effron's major coup came in 2005 when he advised Gillette on its $57 billion sale to Procter & Gamble, which was the largest mergers and acquisitions transaction of 2005. Among Effron's other major deals are:

- General Electric's sale of $200B of financial assets.
- Time Warner Cable on its $79 billion merger with Charter Communications.
- 21st Century Fox on $71.3 billion transactions with The Walt Disney Company.
- Kraft Foods Group, Inc. on its $58 billion merger with Heinz
- InBev's $52 billion acquisition of Anheuser-Busch
- GE on the $32 billion combination of its oil & gas business with Baker Hughes.
- H. J. Heinz Company's $28 billion sale to an investor consortium consisting of 3G Capital and Berkshire Hathaway
- Lorillard's $27.4 billion sale to Reynolds American
- Unilever's $24 billion acquisition of Bestfoods
- PepsiCo's $21 billion acquisition of The Pepsi Bottling Group and PepsiAmericas
- GE's $18 billion sale of remaining 49% interest in NBCUniversal to Comcast
- GE's $13.5 billion pending acquisition of Alstom.
- Diageo's $10 billion sale of Pillsbury to General Mills
- The Hillshire Brands Company $8.6 billion sale to Tyson Foods.
- Diageo's $8 billion purchase of Seagram's wine and spirits business
- News Corporation's $6 billion acquisition of Dow Jones
- PepsiCo's $5.4 billion acquisition of Wimm-Bill-Dann Foods
- NewsCorp's separation of the company into 21st Century Fox and NewsCorp.

In July 2006, Effron co-founded Centerview Partners along with Robert Pruzan, formerly CEO of North America at Dresdner Kleinwort Wasserstein and President of Wasserstein Perella & Co. Additional Centerview co-founders included Stephen Crawford, former co-president at Morgan Stanley, and Adam Chinn, a former partner at Wachtell Lipton. James M. Kilts, former CEO of Gillette, heads the firm's private equity fund.

Effron and his partners have maintained full ownership and consistent growth since founding the firm. In 2024, Centerview Partners ranked fourth among all banks for mergers and acquisitions revenue in the U.S.

== Other affiliations ==
Effron serves on the board of trustees of the Council on Foreign Relations (Vice-Chairman), Lincoln Center (Treasurer), the Metropolitan Museum of Art, New Visions for Public Schools, Partnership for New York City, and Princeton University. He also sits on the advisory board of The Hamilton Project at the Brookings Institution.

Active in the Democratic party, Effron was a prominent supporter of John Kerry's 2004 presidential campaign and an active supporter of Joe Biden's 2020 presidential campaign. He also hosted Obama at his Upper East Side Manhattan home in May 2014 and Hillary Clinton in June 2015. Effron contributes political and business commentary to outlets including the Financial Times, The Wall Street Journal, CNBC, Bloomberg and other publications. In August 2022, Effron was appointed by President Joe Biden as a member of the President’s Intelligence Advisory Board. He has publicly praised the Biden Administration's record, stating on Bloomberg TV that the Biden presidency has produced economic “steadiness, good growth and markets at an all-time high” and on CNBC stating “the Administration has done a strong job getting legislation to help the economy."

Effron has endorsed Kamala Harris's 2024 presidential campaign and organized support for the Vice President within the business community. He stated on CNBC that Harris recognizes the importance of policy alignment with the private sector and on Bloomberg TV that CEOs prefer stability and a free-market based economy.
