= Congregation Chasam Sopher =

Jewish synagogue in New York City

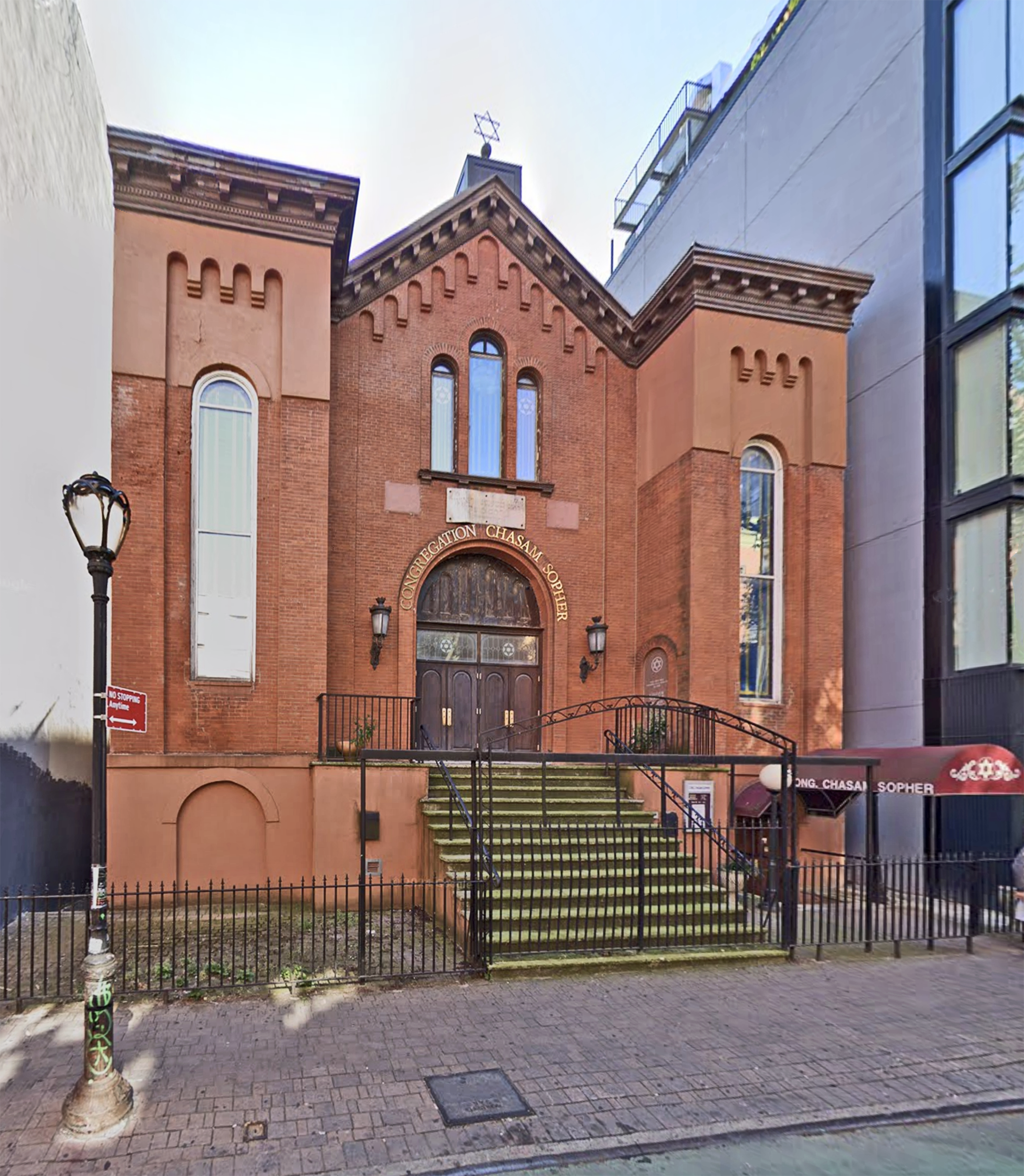
- Synagogue in 2024

- Location in Lower Manhattan

Religion
- Affiliation: Orthodox Judaism
- Ecclesiastical or organisational status: Synagogue
- Leadership: Rabbi Azriel Siff
- Status: Active

Location
- Location: 10 Clinton Street; Lower East Side, Manhattan, New York City, New York
- Country: United States
- Coordinates: 40°43′15″N 73°59′02″W

Architecture
- Type: Synagogue
- Style: Romanesque Revival
- Established: 1892 (as a congregation)
- Completed: 1853

Website
- chasamsopher.org

Congregation Chasam Sopher is an Orthodox Jewish synagogue located at 10 Clinton Street on the Lower East Side of Manhattan, in New York City, New York, United States.

== History ==
The congregation was formed in 1892 by the merger of two congregations of immigrants from Poland. It occupies a historic Romanesque Revival synagogue building built in 1853 by Congregation Rodeph Sholom. The synagogue building is among the oldest synagogues still standing in the United States, the second-oldest synagogue building in New York, and the oldest still in use in the state.

Renovation of the upstairs, completed in 2006, included conservation of the Torah ark, the installation of new stained-glass windows, and stripping the interior of paint to expose the original wood. The outside was also landscaped, creating a garden for the neighborhood.

As of January 2026, the rabbi was Azriel Siff and the president was Eugene Weiser.
