= Quarterdeck Investment Partners, Inc. =

American boutique investment bank

- Company type: Private
- Industry: Financial services
- Founded: 1992; 33 years ago
- Founder: Jon B. Kutler
- Defunct: June 21, 2004
- Fate: Acquired by Jefferies Group
- Headquarters: Los Angeles, California, United States
- Products: Mergers and acquisitions
- Owner: Jefferies Group
- Website: qtrdeck.com

Quarterdeck Investment Partners, Inc. was an American boutique investment bank headquartered in Los Angeles, California which focused exclusively on advising clients in the global aerospace and defense sectors. The company was acquired in 2002 by US financial group, Jefferies Group and renamed Jefferies Quarterdeck.

The company was founded in 1992 by Jon B. Kutler, a former U.S. Naval officer and veteran Wall Street investment banker. Quarterdeck was one of the early pioneers in the successful concept of industry focused investment banking boutiques.

== History ==
The firm quickly grew to four offices and the leading position in global league tables for aerospace and defense merger and acquisition transactions. Quarterdeck advised both global prime contractors such as Lockheed Martin, The Boeing Company, BAE Systems and Northrop Grumman and well as mid-sized consolidators such as L-3 Communications.

In March, 2001, Kutler sold a minority investment in two subsidiaries, Quarterdeck Investment Partners, LLC and Quarterdeck Investment Partners, LTD to NYSE listed investment banking firm Jefferies Group Inc. As part of that transaction a joint venture company, Jefferies Quarterdeck LLC, was created to pursue capital market opportunities in the aerospace and defense sectors In December 2002, Kutler sold the remaining shares of these Quarterdeck entities to Jefferies and remained as Chairman of the Jefferies Quarterdeck.

In 2002, Quarterdeck was the first recipient of the annual Boutique Middle-Market Merger & Acquisition Firm of the Year award by Mergers and Acquisitions Advisor.

In March, 2006, Kutler resigned to focus on the principal investment affiliate of Quarterdeck (Quarterdeck Equity Partners, Inc.) which he renamed Admiralty Partners, Inc. He was replaced by Michael Richter and William Farmer, as Co-Heads of the Jefferies Quarterdeck group.
