= Bernard Wasserstein =

British historian (born 1948)

Bernard Wasserstein (born 22 January 1948) is a British and American historian. He taught at universities in the United States and the United Kingdom from 1976-2014. Now retired, he is an emeritus professor of the University of Chicago.

Wasserstein is the author of 13 books including The Secret Lives of Trebitsch Lincoln (1988), On the Eve: The Jews of Europe Before the Second World War (2012), The Ambiguity of Virtue: Gertrude van Tijn and the Fate of the Dutch Jews (2014), and the latest A Small Town in Ukraine: The Place we came from, the place we went back to (2023). His books have been translated into French, German, Romanian, Portuguese, Spanish, Hebrew, Chinese, Vietnamese, Hungarian, Japanese, and Dutch.

== Early life ==
Bernard Wasserstein was born in London on 22 January 1948. Wasserstein's father, Abraham Wasserstein (1921–1995), born in Frankfurt, was Professor of Classics at the Hebrew University of Jerusalem. His mother, Margaret (née Ecker, 1921–2017), was born in Budapest. All four of Wasserstein's grandparents died in the Holocaust.

He was educated at the High School of Glasgow and Wyggeston Boys' Grammar School, Leicester. He earned a BA in Modern History at Balliol College, Oxford in 1969 and a DPhil at Nuffield College, Oxford in 1974.

== Career ==
Wasserstein was a Research Fellow of Nuffield College, Oxford (1973–5). He taught at the University of Sheffield (1976–9) and Brandeis University in Massachusetts (1980–96), where he was Professor of History and Dean of the Graduate School of Arts and Sciences. He was President of the Oxford Centre for Hebrew and Jewish Studies (1996–2000) and Fellow by Special Election of St Cross College, Oxford. He was Professor of History at the University of Glasgow (2000–2003). From 2003 to 2014 he was Ulrich and Harriet Meyer Professor of Modern European Jewish History at the University of Chicago.

He was a visiting fellow of the Institutes of Advanced Studies in Jerusalem and Tel Aviv, the National Humanities Center in North Carolina, the Swedish Collegium for Advanced Study in Uppsala, All Souls College, Oxford, and the Wissenschaftskolleg zu Berlin. He was awarded a Guggenheim Fellowship in 2007–8 and has also held fellowships of the American Philosophical Society, the American Council of Learned Societies, and the National Endowment for Humanities. In 2015–16, he was Allianz Visiting Professor of Modern Jewish History at LMU Munich. In the spring of 2019, he was a visiting scholar at the Center for the Study of Urban History of East Central Europe, Lviv.

Wasserstein is a Corresponding Fellow of the British Academy. He was a member of the Executive of the Leo Baeck Institute London (1997–2003), President of the Jewish Historical Society of England (2000–2002), and a board member of the Menasseh ben Israel Institute, Amsterdam.

Now an emeritus professor of the University of Chicago, Wasserstein is retired from teaching but continues to engage in historical research and writing.

== Personal life ==
Wasserstein is a dual citizen of the United States and the United Kingdom. He is married to Shirley Haasnoot, a Dutch journalist and historian. He has one son and one daughter and lives in Amsterdam.

His brother, David J. Wasserstein, is an Emeritus Professor of History at Vanderbilt University. His sister, Celia Wasserstein-Fassberg, is an Emeritus Professor of International Law at the Hebrew University of Jerusalem.

== Awards ==
- Crime Writers' Association Golden Dagger Award for Non-Fiction, 1988.
- Yad Vashem International Book Prize, 2013.

== Honours ==
In 2001, Wasserstein was awarded the 'advanced research degree' of DLitt by Oxford University.

He is an International Fellow of the British Academy.

== Selected works ==
=== Books ===
- The British in Palestine: The Mandatory Government and the Arab-Jewish Conflict 1917–1929 (1978)
- Britain and the Jews of Europe, 1939–1945 (1979)
- The Jews in Modern France, edited with Frances Malino (1985)
- The Secret Lives of Trebitsch Lincoln (1988)
- Herbert Samuel: A Political Life (1992)
- Vanishing Diaspora: The Jews in Europe since 1945 (1996)
- Secret War in Shanghai (1999)
- Divided Jerusalem: The Struggle for the Holy City (2001)
- Israelis and Palestinians: Why Do They Fight? Can They Stop? (2003)
- Barbarism and Civilization: A History of Europe in Our Time (2007)
- On the Eve: The Jews of Europe Before the Second World War (2012)
- The Ambiguity of Virtue: Gertrude van Tijn and the Fate of the Dutch Jews (2014)
- A Small Town in Ukraine: The Place we came from, the place we went back to (2023)

=== Articles ===
- Wasserstein, Bernard, "The Wild Men who Threaten the World", Evening Standard, 13 Oct 2000, p. 205

=== Audio ===
- "Confessions of a Jewish Historian". The Yiddish Book Center’s Frances Brandt Online Yiddish Audio Library, March 2, 1989.
