= Wasserstein Perella & Co. =

American investment bank

- Type: Investment bank
- Industry: Finance
- Founded: 1988
- Defunct: 2000
- Fate: sold to DrKW
- Successor: DrKW
- Headquarters: New York
- Products: Financial services

Wasserstein Perella & Co. was a boutique investment bank established by Bruce Wasserstein, Joseph R. Perella, Bill Lambert, and Charles Ward in 1988, former bankers at First Boston Corp., until its eventual sale to Dresdner Bank in 2000 for some $1.4 billion in stock. The private equity business of the investment firm was not included in the sale and was to be sold off to existing Wasserstein shareholders.

== History ==
In a 2007 New York Times article, Perella was described as "one of the financial industry’s sharpest recruiters" who "discovered and helped train" Wasserstein Perella. Then, in the 1980s at First Boston, and at Wasserstein Perella after 1988, together they helped create "a dynasty of bankers and executives that has spread throughout Wall Street and corporate America". They included Robert S. Wiesenthal who became chairman of Sony; Jeffrey A. Rosen, vice chairman at Lazard; Raymond J. McGuire of Citigroup; Douglas L. Braunstein of JPMorgan Chase; Ronald Kramer, former President of Wynn Resorts and current CEO of Griffon Corporation; Michael B. Kraines of Sandler O'Neill; John H. Simpson, formerly Canyon Partners, now Broadhaven LLC; Robert Pruzan, founder of Centerview Partners; Deborah C. Wright of Carver Federal Savings Bank; Gail Zauder of Credit Suisse; current ABC News contributor, former mayor of Chicago and former chief of staff for President Obama Rahm Emanuel; Howard Kerzner, hotel tycoon and son of Sol Kerzner; Jon B. Kutler, founder of Quarterdeck Investment Partners, Inc., now with Admiralty Partners, Inc.; Michael J. Biondi, investment banking chair at Lazard, nicknamed Mr. Judgement; Gary Parr at Lazard; Hugh "Skip" McGee III, former head of Lehman's investment banking, now at Barclays; Mark G. Shafir, former global co-head of M&A at Lehman Brothers, now with Citigroup; Walid Chammah, former CEO of Barclays International; Veritas Capital's Robert B. McKeon; and others. One First Boston analyst, Paul Mecurio, left corporate life to become a comedian.

Perella left the firm for Morgan Stanley in 1993. Wasserstein stayed through the 2001 takeover by Dresdner Bank, but left the firm in 2002, following the 2001 merger of Dresdner and Allianz, to head investment bank Lazard, until his unexpected death in 2009. The investment banking business of Dresdner Bank changed its name to Dresdner Kleinwort Wasserstein as a result of the deal. In 2006, four years after Wasserstein's departure, it dropped Wasserstein's name.

== Mergers ==
In 2000, Wasserstein Perella ranked fifth in the U.S. as an adviser on mergers and acquisitions.

Wasserstein Perella advised Axa Financial in the $11.5 billion sale of Donaldson Lufkin & Jenrette to Credit Suisse First Boston in 2000, Philip Morris in its $14.9 billion acquisition of Nabisco Holdings Corp. and Time Warner in its $128 billion merger with America Online. Other deals include the $25 billion merger of Swiss Bank Corp and UBS and the $10 billion merger of Morgan Stanley & Co. and Dean Witter Discover & Co.
