= Griffon Corporation =

Multinational conglomerate

- Formerly: Instrument Systems Corporation (ISC) (1959–1995)
- Type: Public
- Traded as: NYSE: GFF; S&P 600 component
- Industry: Conglomerate; Building products Aerospace and defense Garage doors Plastics
- Founded: 1959; 67 years ago, in College Point, Queens, New York, United States
- Headquarters: 712 Fifth Avenue, New York City, United States
- Area served: Worldwide
- Key people: Ronald J. Kramer (chairman and CEO); Robert F. Mehmel (president and COO); Brian G. Harris (Senior Vice President and CFO); Seth Kaplan (Senior Vice President and General Counsel)
- Products: Diversified investments
- Revenue: ▼US$2.52 billion (2025)
- Operating income: ▼US$206 million (2025)
- Net income: ▼US$51 million (2025)
- Total assets: ▼US$2.06 billion (2025)
- Total equity: ▼US$74 million (2025)
- Number of employees: 5,100 (2025)
- Subsidiaries: Ames True Temper; ClosetMaid; Clopay Building Products; CornellCookson
- Website: griffon.com

Griffon Corporation is a multinational conglomerate headquartered in New York City. It operates as a diversified management and holding company. The company has four subsidiaries: Ames True Temper, ClosetMaid, Clopay Building Products, and CornellCookson. Griffon has been publicly traded since 1961 and is listed on the New York Stock Exchange as a component stock of the S&P SmallCap 600, S&P Composite 1500, and Russell 2000 indices.

== History ==
=== Founding and early years (1959–1964) ===
In 1959, Long Island businessman Helmuth W. Waldorf – a tool and die maker's apprentice who had immigrated to the United States from Germany to study at Columbia University – founded a small defense electronics company in College Point, Queens named Waldorf Controls Corporation. The company changed its name later that year to Instrument Systems Corporation (ISC). In 1961, ISC issued shares to the public and bolstered its avionics business by acquiring Telephonics Corporation. Established in December 1933, Telephonics was among a handful of aviation electronics pioneers that formed the nucleus of the aviation and defense industry on Long Island during the mid-20th century. ISC struggled financially in its early years. To reposition the company for future growth, ISC's major stakeholders, including Waldorf and director Lester Avnet, the president of Avnet Electronics Corporation and son of its founder Charles Avnet, turned to a highly regarded former executive at Loral Corporation, Edward Garrett.

=== Edward J. Garrett era (1964–1982) ===
Edward Garrett was named chairman and president of ISC in 1964. Following a strategy that had proved successful at Loral, Garrett transformed ISC by closing deficit-ridden plants, seeking civilian markets as well as government research-and-development contracts, and acquiring defense, commercial electronics and manufacturing companies. In 1966, Garrett brought in his son-in-law, Harvey Blau, a former Assistant U.S. Attorney for the Southern District of New York, as General Counsel to handle legal matters and transactions. ISC purchased 20 companies in 1968 alone, ranking second in acquisitions nationwide that year, as investor appetite for corporate conglomerates reached its peak. That year, ISC listed its stock on the American Stock Exchange.

ISC's subsidiaries operated plants throughout the United States and Canada producing electronic devices, special purpose trucks, hardware tools, furniture, packaging and building materials. After successfully producing communications systems for the U.S. military, Telephonics won multi-year contracts to produce multiplex passenger entertainment systems for the new Boeing 747 and Lockheed L-1011 wide-body airplanes.

Net sales increased from $5.7 million in 1964 to $165.2 million in 1970 and total assets from $4.1 million to $120.4 million in the same period. In 1970, ISC was listed for the first time on the Fortune 500 list of America's largest companies. As the 1970s progressed, the company was negatively impacted by decreased defense spending as the Vietnam War ended, and by general economic uncertainty. The first and second oil crises as well as the recessions of 1973–1975 and the early 1980s further diminished ISC's prospects. As a result of these macroeconomic developments and the divestiture of underperforming divisions, ISC's revenues fell from $233.25 million in 1974 to $104.3 million in 1982 – the year Garrett died at age 64.

=== Harvey R. Blau era (1982–2008) ===
Following Edward Garrett's death in 1982, Blau was named chairman of the board and CEO. Blau accelerated Garrett's divestiture and cost-cutting plan and sold the company's window, lighting and metal casting operations. The company also raised capital via a rights offering to existing shareholders, boosting shareholder equity from $4.6 million to $33.7 million and reducing long-term debt. ISC's subsidiaries also successfully secured new business. Telephonics received orders to develop components for the central integrated test system of Rockwell International's B-1B bomber, communications and radio control systems for Lockheed S-3A aircraft and Sikorsky SH-60 Seahawk LAMPS MK III helicopters, and a new advanced audio communications system for NASA's Space Shuttle orbiter spaceplane.

In addition to strengthening ISC's existing lines of business, Blau diversified revenues by acquiring companies in unrelated industries. In 1984, ISC acquired troubled clothing manufacturer Oneita Knitting Mills, Inc., for $14 million. Blau and his team renamed the company Oneita Industries, restructured its finances, and grew it to the country's third-largest maker of specialty T-shirts, tripling sales to $300 million within a few years. ISC took Oneita public in 1988, selling 34% of shares for about $9 million, and had divested the remainder of the company by 1993.

The purchase of Clopay Corporation in 1986 for $37 million represented ISC's most successful diversification effort under Blau. Founded as a paper wholesaler in 1859, this Cincinnati-based company started to produce window coverings during World War II and subsequently changed its name to Clopay, a portmanteau of "cloth and paper." Clopay entered the plastic film and garage door business in 1952 and 1966, respectively. It grew in the 1990s and 2000s, becoming a leading manufacturer of residential garage doors in the United States and one of the suppliers of plastic films for diapers, surgical gowns, and drapes. In 1991, Clopay accounted for 70% of ISC's $50 million operating income.

In 1994, Blau moved the company's stock from the American Stock Exchange to the more prestigious New York Stock Exchange, and changed its name to Griffon Corporation after the mythical half-lion, half-eagle.

Griffon continued to grow from the mid-1990s through the mid-2000s. Sales surpassed the $1 billion mark in 1999 and $1.5 billion mark in 2006. Clopay Plastics formed a joint venture named Finotech with German-based Corovin GmbH to manufacture specialty plastic films and laminates in Europe in 1996, taking a 60% stake in the new company. Finotech provided Clopay Plastics with a platform for further international expansion. Clopay purchased Bohme Verpackungsfolien GmbH & Co., a German manufacturer of plastic packaging and specialty films in 1998 and a 60% stake in Isofilme Ltda, a Brazilian manufacturer of plastic hygienic and specialty films, in 2002. Three years later, Clopay acquired full ownership in Finotech and Isofilme. Telephonics won its first contract for more than $100 million in 1997. It received $114 million from the British Royal Air Force to supply communications equipment to upgrade Nimrod anti-submarine airplanes. However, Telephonics reduced its overall dependence on military contracts and expanded its commercial and nondefense government business. It won a $26 million contract to supply wireless communications equipment for 1,080 New York City Subway cars in 1997.

Griffon's garage door subsidiary expanded in step with the residential housing boom in the United States. It added a home installation service for residential building products such as garage doors, manufactured fireplaces, floor coverings, and cabinetry. In 1997, Griffon purchased Holmes-Hally Industries for about $35 million. Holmes-Hally was a West Coast manufacturer and installer of residential garage doors and related hardware with $80 million in annual sales. By 2006, the installation services subsidiary served 17% of all new residential housing in the United States.

The 2000s United States housing market correction and subsequent Subprime mortgage crisis and the 2008 financial crisis caused net sales of the garage doors subsidiary to decline by 13% in 2007 and 10.5% in 2008, with operating profits decreasing from $41 million in 2006 to $7 million in 2007 to -$17 million in 2008. Net sales of the installation services subsidiary shrunk from $309 million in 2006 to $251 million in 2007 to $109 million in 2008, forcing Griffon to discontinue the installation services business in 2008. Griffon's overall net income shrunk from $52 million to $22 million to -$41 million in the same time period. Griffon also came under pressure from shareholders during this crisis. In 2007, the hedge fund Clinton Group, which was Griffon's second-largest shareholder at 8.5%, urged the company to boost its share price by purchasing 50% of the shares outstanding and also demanded the right to appoint the majority of Griffon directors.

=== Ronald J. Kramer era (2008–present) ===
Blau resigned from his role as CEO in 2008, and was succeeded by his son-in-law Ron Kramer on April 1, 2008. Blau continued as non-executive chairman of the board. An investment banker who had married Blau's daughter Stephanie in 1992, Kramer had served on the company's board of directors since 1993 and was elected vice chairman in 2003. To improve Griffon's balance sheet, Kramer secured a new $100 million revolving line of credit from JPMorgan Chase, exited the residential installation services business, which had experienced a 65% decline in net sales over 3 years (see above), refinanced Griffon's senior debt, and raised about $250 million from a stock offering and investments by Goldman Sachs, Kramer, and existing Griffon shareholders.

In 2009, Griffon hired Brian Harris from Dover Corporation as chief accounting officer, promoting him to vice president and controller in 2012 and senior vice president and chief financial officer in 2015. In 2012, the company named Robert Mehmel President and chief operating officer. Mehmel joined Griffon from DRS Technologies, a manufacturer of defense electronic products, systems, and military support services, which grew from $400 million to over $4 billion in sales during his tenure. In 2008, DRS was acquired by Italian conglomerate Finmeccanica for $5.2 billion which, at that time, was the largest single acquisition of a U.S. defense company by a foreign firm.

Griffon reduced Telephonics' staff from 1,400 in 2010 to 1,100 in 2012 as U.S. defense spending with the wars in Iraq and Afghanistan decreased. The restructured its facilities and organizational structure, and expanded its presence in homeland security, air traffic management, and unmanned aerial vehicles. In 2012, Telephonics formed a joint venture with Mahindra & Mahindra to produce radar and surveillance systems for the Indian Ministry of Defense and the civilian sector near Delhi, India. This joint venture together with civilian contracts, such as a $23 million award from the Federal Aviation Administration in 2014 to upgrade airport surveillance radar.

To diversify revenue stream in the home and building products division, Griffon purchased Ames True Temper for $542 million in 2010. Founded in 1774, Ames was a manufacturer of non-powered landscaping tools. Kramer strengthened the new subsidiary through further acquisitions, which were integrated into Ames True Temper. In 2011, Griffon acquired the Southern Patio pots and planters business from Southern Sales & Marketing Group for $23 million. To complement the Southern Patio brand, Griffon purchased Northcote Pottery, an Australian maker of garden decor products founded in 1897, for $22 million in late 2013. A few months later, Griffon acquired Cyclone, the Australian garden and tools division of Illinois Tool Works, for $40 million.

Between August 2011 and March 2018, Griffon repurchased 21.9 million shares of common stock for a total of $290 million.

Kramer was appointed chairman of the board in 2018, succeeding Harvey Blau after his death in January 2018.

=== Portfolio reorganization ===
Starting in 2017, Griffon executed a series of transactions to increase shareholder value, and to reshape the company's portfolio with the objectives of better focusing and strengthening its core businesses. In 2017, Griffon acquired the ClosetMaid home storage business from Emerson for an effective purchase price of $165 million. Griffon announced the combination of ClosetMaid with Ames True Tempur in March 2018.

In November 2017, Griffon announced the sale of its Clopay Plastics business to Berry Global for $475 million. This transaction, which closed in February 2018, marked Griffon's exit from the specialty plastics industry that the company entered when it acquired Clopay in 1986.

Griffon bolstered its Clopay Building Products subsidiary with the acquisition of CornellCookson, a provider of rolling steel service doors, fire doors, and grilles, for an effective purchase price of $170 million. This transaction provided Clopay Building Products with a line of commercial rolling steel products.

In the United Kingdom, Griffon acquired La Hacienda, an outdoor living brand, in 2017, and decorative outdoor landscaping company KelKay in 2018. In Australia, Griffon started announcing in 2017 that it had acquired Hills Home Living, a brand of clotheslines and home products, from Hills Limited. Later, in September 2017, Griffon acquired gardening supply company Tuscan Path.

In the United States, Griffon acquired cleaning products manufacturer Harper Brush Works from Horizon Global in October 2017 to expand the Ames line of long-handle tools.

== Operating segments and subsidiaries ==
Griffon today conducts its operations through five wholly owned subsidiaries in two reportable segments.

=== Home and Building Products Segment ===
Griffon's Home and Building Products segment includes Ames True Tempur, ClosetMaid, Clopay Building Products, and CornellCookson.

==== Clopay Building Products ====
Clopay Building Products (CBP) is the largest manufacturer and marketer of residential garage doors in North America and one of the largest manufacturers of industrial and commercial doors. CBP operates through a national network of over 50 distribution centers across North America, and sells to approximately 2,000 independent professional installing dealers as well as to major home center retail chains.

CBP's self-installment customers are Home Depot and Menards. CBP's family of brands includes Clopay, America's Favorite Garage Doors, Holmes Garage Door Company, and IDEAL Door.

CBP traces its operations to the purchase of garage door maker Baker-Aldor-Jones by Clopay Corporation in 1964, and the acquisition of Holmes-Hally Industries in 1997. Today, Clopay continues to manufacture its products in the United States, with headquarters and principal manufacturing sites in Ohio.

==== CornellCookson ====
CornellCookson is a North American manufacturer of rolling steel doors, shutters, and security grilles.

==== Ames True Temper ====
Acquired by Griffon for $542 million in 2010, Ames True Temper is a provider of non-powered lawn and garden tools and accessories, including long handle tools, wheelbarrows, planters, snow tools, striking tools, pruning tools, garden hoses, and clotheslines. Ames is one of the oldest companies in the United States in continuous operation, founded when Captain John Ames started his blacksmith shop making America's finest metal shovels in 1774. Ames continues to manufacture long handle and hand tools to this day. Many of Ames's businesses and brands, including True Temper, Garant, and Union Tool, can trace back their histories directly or through predecessor companies to the 1800s.

The largest customers of Ames are Home Depot, Lowe's, Walmart, Costco and Bunnings. Ames tool brands include Ames, True Temper, Union Tools, Garant, Cyclone, Kelso, Razor-Back, Jackson, Trojan, Trojan Cyclone, Supercraft, and Westmix. Garden hose, storage products and apparel care products are sold primarily under the Ames, NeverLeak, Nylex, Jackson, and Hills brands. Planters, landscaping and lawn accessories brands include Southern Patio, Northcote Pottery, Kelkay and Dynamic Design.

Ames maintains manufacturing operations in the United States and Canada, and also has principal operations in Australia and the United Kingdom. Ames is headquartered in Pennsylvania. President Donald Trump visited the Ames wheelbarrow and manufacturing plant in Harrisburg, Pennsylvania on May 7, 2017 to commemorate his 100th day in office while highlighting his emphasis on buying products that are made in America. The Ames plant in Harrisburg was the largest wheelbarrow factory in the world before it was closed in 2023.

=== Telephonics Corporation ===
Griffon owned Telephonics between 1961 and 2022. Telephonics manufactures intelligence, surveillance, and communications technology. The company was originally founded in 1933. In June 2022, Griffon sold Telephonics to TTM Technologies, a manufacturer of printed circuit boards, backplane assemblies and RF modules and assemblies, for $330 million in cash.
