= Abraham Wasserstein =

German-born British and Israeli classicist

Abraham "Addi" Wasserstein (Hebrew: עדי וסרשטיין; 5 October 1921 – 20 July 1995) was a German-born British and Israeli classicist, a professor of classics at the University of Leicester in the UK and then at the Hebrew University of Jerusalem.

== Early life ==
Wasserstein was born in Frankfurt am Main in Germany on 5 October 1921. His parents were Galician; his father was a raincoat manufacturer in Berlin. Wasserstein was educated at a Jewish school in Berlin, although his education was disrupted by the rise of Nazism in Germany. As a Jew his life was endangered due to the virulent antisemitism, and he was among those Jews expelled towards Poland on 28 October 1938. Denied entry by the Poles, he spent a year in a camp on the border at Zbąszyń, before leaving for Rome in later summer 1939 and then to Turkey, and finally Palestine in 1941, where he met his wife-to-be, Margaret ("Macca"), a fellow refugee.

== Academic career ==
Wasserstein came to Britain at the end of World War II, in 1946, gaining a BA with first-class honours (1947) and then a PhD (1951) at Birkbeck College, London. His first academic post was as an Assistant to the Department of Greek under Arnold Gomme at the University of Glasgow in 1951, converted three months later to a lectureship. He held the post until 1960, when he was appointed professor of classics at the University of Leicester. He was appointed Dean of the Faculty of Arts and Chairman of the SCR in his later years at the university. Wasserstein left Leicester in 1969 for the chair in Classics at the Hebrew University of Jerusalem. He spent most of his time, however, teaching at the University of Tel Aviv as few students in Jerusalem wanted to study Greek. He worked on manuscripts from the library at Saint Catherine's Monastery on Mount Sinai, and was President of the Classical Association of Israel between 1971 and 1974.

== Personal life ==
Wasserstein married his wife Margaret ("Macca"), in 1942. Macca (née Ecker, 1921 – 2017), was born in Budapest, the daughter of a carpenter. The Wassersteins had a daughter, Celia, (now a professor at the Hebrew University of Jerusalem Law School), and two sons, Bernard, (born 22 January 1948, professor of history at the University of Chicago), and David (a classical scholar who turned to medieval Hebrew and Arabic studies, and is a professor at Vanderbilt University in Tennessee). Wasserstein died in Jerusalem on 20 July 1995.

== Publications ==
- 1961, Economy and Elegance: An Inaugural Lecture Delivered at the University, Leicester, 23 February 1961, Leicester University Press.
- 1974, Flavius Josephus: Selections from his works, introduction and notes by Abraham Wasserstein, Viking Press.
- 1982, Galen's Commentary on the Hippocratic Treatise Airs, Waters, Places in the Hebrew Translation of Solomon ha-Me'ati (Proceedings of the Israel Academy of Sciences and Humanities, 6:3).
- 2006, finished by his son David J. Wasserstein after his death, The Legend of the Septuagint from Classical Antiquity to Today, Cambridge University Press.

An obituary stated that Wasserstein produced "a mass of learned articles on Greek drama, Greek mathematics, and on the minutiae of Greek texts. Had he been sparing of the time he gave to his graduate students and their theses, his own corpus would have been much greater."

- Three festschrifts, Studies in Memory of Abraham Wasserstein, were published in 1996, 1997 and 1998, respectively, by the Israel Society for the Promotion of Classical Studies.
