= Champlain Valley Physicians Hospital =

- Location within New York

Geography
- Location: Plattsburgh, New York, United States
- Coordinates: 44.700216°N 73.471008°W

Organization
- Type: Not for profit

Services
- Emergency department: Level III trauma center
- Beds: 300

Links
- Website: http://www.cvph.org/
- Lists: Hospitals in New York State

Champlain Valley Physicians Hospital (CVPH) is a hospital located in Plattsburgh, New York.

Champlain Valley Physicians' Hospital was created in 1972 by the merger of the private Physician's Hospital with Champlain Valley Hospital, a charitable hospital operated by the Grey Nuns. As UVM Health Network - Champlain Valley Physicians Hospital, it is currently a not-for-profit facility incorporating a variety of inpatient, outpatient, and community outreach care services, including an oncology center, a nursing home unit, renal dialysis center, adult and child/adolescent mental health wards, and medical and surgical capabilities. In recent years, the cardiology services provided by Lake Champlain Cardiology Associates have expanded to include coronary interventional care provided by Champlain Valley Cardiology and open-heart surgery, provided by Champlain Valley Cardiothoracic Surgeons. The hospital also has a variety of diagnostic and rehabilitation services.

In 2012, CVPH Medical Center joined Fletcher Allen Partners, now the University of Vermont Health Network.

== Notable people ==
- Robert Garrow (1936–1978), spree killer; was treated at CVPH after being shot and allegedly paralyzed by police
- George W. Gilbert (1873–1944), politician who died at CVPH
- William H. Miner (c.1862–1930), entrepreneur who founded CVPH and later died there after surgery
- Joseph E. Newburger (1853–1931), lawyer who received treatments for a month at CVPH prior to his death
