= Perella Weinberg Partners =

U.S.-based financial services firm

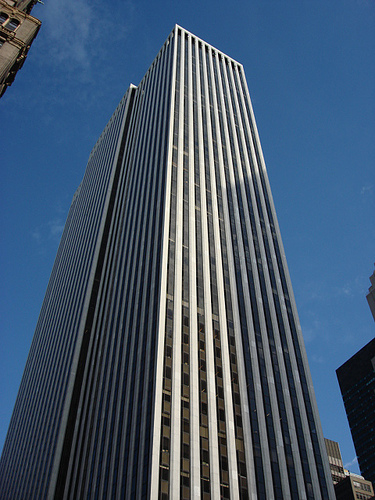
- Headquarters at 767 Fifth Avenue
- Type: Public
- Traded as: Nasdaq: PWP
- Industry: Financial services
- Founded: 2006; 20 years ago
- Founders: Joseph R. Perella; Peter A. Weinberg; Tarek “Terry” Abdel-Meguid
- Headquarters: 767 Fifth Avenue, New York City, US
- Key people: Andrew Bednar (CEO); Dietrich Becker (president); Robert K. Steel (Vice Chairman)
- Revenue: US$878 million (2024)
- Number of employees: 700 (2024)
- Website: pwpartners.com

Perella Weinberg Partners (PWP) is an American global financial services firm focused on investment banking advisory services.

The firm was founded in 2006 by Joseph R. Perella, Peter A. Weinberg and Terry Meguid, and went public in 2021. It is headquartered in New York City with offices in London, Paris, Munich, Houston, San Francisco, Los Angeles, Chicago, Denver, and Calgary.

== History ==
Perella Weinberg Partners was launched in June 2006, with offices in New York and London.

To help establish the firm's operations and to seed investment initiatives, PWP raised over US$1.1 billion from a group of investors.

In 2016, the firm acquired the Houston-based energy investment and merchant banking firm Tudor, Pickering, Holt & Co., to be operated as the energy practice of PWP.

In December 2020, the firm announced it would go public by merging with FinTech Acquisition Corporation IV, a Nasdaq-listed SPAC sponsored by Cohen Circle. The transaction closed in June 2021 and Perella Weinberg began trading on Nasdaq on June 25, 2021 under the ticker PWP.

In 2026, year-long negotiations for an all-stock merger with financial services company competitor Piper Sandler were ended.

== Leadership ==
Prior to co-founding PWP, Peter Weinberg was the CEO of Goldman Sachs International in London and co-headed the Global Investment Banking Division.

Joe Perella previously founded Wasserstein Perella & Co. in 1988 and from 1992 to 2005, he worked in senior roles at Morgan Stanley as head of mergers and acquisitions, and then the chairman of the Institutional Securities and Investment Banking Group. He then joined Peter and founded PWP in 2006.

Robert K. Steel joined the firm in 2014 as CEO, and is vice chairman. He formerly was New York City’s Deputy Mayor for Economic Development, President and CEO of Wachovia Corporation, Under Secretary for the United States Treasury in the George W. Bush administration, and spent 30 years at Goldman Sachs in various senior roles.

Andrew Bednar and Dietrich Becker have been partners at PWP since its founding in 2006 and were co-presidents for some time. Andrew Bednar was named CEO in January 2023. As of 2026, Becker continues as president.

Board members as of 2025 have included Bednar, Becker, Steel and Perella.

== Business ==
=== Advisory ===
PWP advises clients on mergers and acquisitions, restructuring, financing, capital markets advisory, liability management, shareholder engagement and activism transactions.

In 2012, the firm represented NYSE Euronext in its $11 billion sale to Intercontinental Exchange.

In June 2014, PWP advised on medical device maker Medtronic’s $42.9 billion acquisition of Covidien.

In February 2015, PWP fired several senior members of its restructuring group after it learnt they planned to start their own firm. In June 2015, they formed Ducera Partners. Its co-founders and PWP are engaged in a legal battle where the co-founders have sued for wrongful termination while PWP's counterclaim is they breached their employment contact and should compensate it for loss of business.

In March 2015, PWP advised materials company Holcim in its spin-off of its North American business. In October 2015, the firm advised Altria Group, Inc. in connection with AB InBev’s acquisition of SABMiller, valued at over $100 billion, approved in 2016.

In October 2016, PWP advised AT&T in its $108.7 billion acquisition of Time Warner. In December of the same year, they advised Linde in the all-share merger between Linde and Praxair, a deal valued at more than $65 billion.

In April 2017, the firm was retained by medical technology and drug company CareFusion to advise on their sale to Becton Dickinson, a deal valued at $12.2 billion in cash and stock.

In March 2018, the firm advised E.ON, a European electric utility company, in an asset swap with RWE. E.ON acquired RWE’s 76.8% stake in energy company Innogy, with RWE receiving a 16.67% share in E.ON along with its renewable businesses. In August 2018, the firm’s subsidiary Tudor, Pickering, Holt & Co. advised Energen Corp on their sale to Diamondback Energy Inc., an all-stock deal valued at approximately $9.2 billion. In August 2018, Perella Weinberg was the financial advisor for SodaStream on its sale to PepsiCo for $3.2 billion.

In March 2019, the firm advised Oaktree Capital Management in its sale of a 62% stake to Brookfield Asset Management, a deal valued at approximately $4.7 billion. In June of the same year, Perella Weinberg advised Altran in its sale to consulting firm Capgemini, a take-over valued at $4.1 billion. Later in October, PWP advised the board of Groupe PSA in their $50 billion merger with Fiat Chrysler Automobiles that, upon close, would create the world’s fourth-largest automaker. In November, PWP was the financial advisor to PayPal in their $4 billion acquisition of Honey Science Corp, a shopping and rewards platform.

PWP was financial advisor to the directors of iHeart Media during its $20 billion restructuring, considered the largest restructuring of 2019. They were also advisor to the $4 billion recapitalization of Concordia Resources.

In 2019, PWP advised the WeWork board of directors on the $9.5 billion majority stake acquisition by SoftBank.

In April 2020, PWP was the financial advisor to an ad hoc group of PG&E unsecured bond holders in connection to PG&E’s restructuring agreement. In 2020, the firm was financial advisor to California Resources Corporation in connection with various liability management transactions and the company’s pre-arranged Chapter 11 plan of reorganization.

In April 2020, the firm was hired to advise the U.S. Treasury Department in connection with the portion of the CARES Act focused on businesses critical to maintaining national security. In December 2020, PWP advised Northrop Grumman on the sale of its Federal IT and Mission Support Services Business to Veritas Capital for $3.4 billion.

In February 2021, PWP was the exclusive financial advisor to Kraft Heinz in connection with the sale of its Planters brand to Hormel Foods for $3.35 billion. In May, the firm was financial advisor to Discovery, Inc.’s Independent Transaction Committee in connection with Discovery’s combination with AT&T’s WarnerMedia, advised Cimarex Energy on its $8.9 billion all-stock merger of equals with Cabot Oil & Gas, and was financial advisor to Vonovia in connection with its $22 billion business combination with Deutsche Wohnen. PWP also advised KKR on its $5.3 billion take-private acquisition of Cloudera in June 2021. The firm advised MKS instruments on its $5.1 billion acquisition of Atotech in July of the same year.

In late 2021, the firm advised Baxter International on its $12.4 billion acquisition of HIll-Rom.

PWP has advised on numerous SPAC transactions such as Pershing Square Tontine Holdings' acquisition of 10% of Universal Music Group for approximately $4 billion and Owl Rock Capital Group’s definitive business combination agreement with Dyal Capital Partners to form Blue Owl Capital Inc. and list on NYSE via a $12.5 billion business combination with Altimar Acquisition Corporation. The firm also advised Parallel, a medical marijuana company, on its $1.9 billion business combination with Ceres Acquisition Corporation in February, 2021, and was financial advisor to Science 37 on its $1.05 billion merger with LifeSci Acquisition II Corporation in May of the same year.

In March 2021, PWP and its partners sponsored PWP Forward Acquisition Corp. I, a blank check company led by women and focused on enhancing access to public financing for companies that are founded by, led by, or enrich the lives of women.

In 2022, the firm was selected by John J. Ray and the defunct FTX companies as the lead investment bank to help manage the assets amidst the Bankruptcy of FTX. The firm also advised The Estée Lauder Companies in connection with its $2.8 billion acquisition of the Tom Ford brand.

In 2023, PWP were the financial advisors to Baxter International in connection with its $4.25 billion sale of BioPharma Solutions to Advent International and Warburg Pincus. That year the firm also advised the merger between Cedar Fair in its merger with Six Flags for a combined value of $8 billion.

In February 2024, PWP advised Spirit Airlines in its bankruptcy dealings following its failed merger with JetBlue. Later in the year the firm advised Bosch in its acquisition of Johnson Controls, including assets with Johnson Controls Hitachi. The firm also advised the chemical producer Covestro when it was acquired by Adnoc in October 2024.

In August 2025, PWP acquired Devon Park Advisors, a secondaries advisory firm founded in 2021.

=== Asset management ===
PWP operates an asset management business separate from its investment banking business under the brand Agility, which is an outsourced CIO provider for endowments, foundations, sovereign wealth funds, family offices, and other long term investors. Chris Bittman is CEO and CIO of Agility, which managed assets of approximately $13.5 billion. PWP Agility Fund was named Outsourced CIO of the Year by Institutional Investor in 2017, 2015, and 2014, and by Foundation & Endowment Intelligence in 2013.
