= First Boston =

American investment bank

The First Boston Corporation
- Company type: Private
- Industry: Investment services
- Founded: July 12, 1932; 93 years ago
- Fate: Acquired by Credit Suisse in 1988 and merged into Credit Suisse First Boston
- Successor: Credit Suisse First Boston; Credit Suisse; UBS Group AG
- Headquarters: New York City, New York, United States
- Products: Financial services Investment banking
- Owner: Credit Suisse

For the company after its acquisition by Credit Suisse, see Credit Suisse First Boston (known as CSFB and CS First Boston)

The First Boston Corporation was a New York–based bulge bracket investment bank, founded in 1932 and acquired by Credit Suisse in 1988. After the acquisition, it operated as an independent investment bank known as CS First Boston until 2006, when the company was fully integrated into Credit Suisse. In 2022, Credit Suisse revived the "First Boston" brand as part of an effort to spin out the business.

== History ==
=== Founding ===
The First Boston Corporation was formed in Boston, Massachusetts, on June 27, 1932, as the investment banking arm of the First National Bank of Boston. It became an independent firm after passage of the Glass–Steagall Act, a New Deal banking legislation that required commercial banks to divest securities businesses following the 1929 stock market crash. During this time, the company became the largest publicly owned investment banking firm in the United States. First National Bank of Boston continued as a commercial bank, eventually becoming part of Bank of America. The early First Boston investment bank had been assembled from the investment banking arms of major commercial banks. For example, several key members of Chase Harris Forbes Corporation, the securities affiliate of Chase National Bank, joined the new investment bank in 1934.

=== 1940s ===
In 1946, Mellon Securities Corporation, the former investment banking arm of Mellon Bank, merged into the First Boston. Mellon's franchise with industrial and governmental clients led to some major deals: initial public debt offerings for the World Bank and Hydro-Québec, and a share offering for Gulf Oil Corporation in 1948 (the largest IPO to date).

By 1947, the First Boston surpassed $1 billion in new capital issues, and in 1959 it reintroduced the credit of Japan to the American markets with the first offerings by its government since 1930.

=== 1970s ===
First Boston logo used before 1988

As of 1970, First Boston was considered to be part of the bulge bracket along with Morgan Stanley, Dillon Read and Kuhn Loeb.

By 1970, the Firm was raising more than $10 billion in new capital annually for underwriting clients. In 1971, The First Boston Corporation listed on the New York Stock Exchange developed its equity, sales, research, and trading operations. In 1978, First Boston began its highly successful London operations in partnership with Credit Suisse (see "Relationship with Credit Suisse" below) and became a leading Eurobond trader and underwriter.

=== 1980s and Relationship with Credit Suisse ===
CS First Boston logo used from 1988 to 1996

Credit Suisse's relationship with First Boston began in 1978, when White Weld & Co. was bought by Merrill Lynch. As a result, White Weld dropped out of its London-based investment banking partnership with Credit Suisse. First Boston stepped in, creating Financière Crédit Suisse-First Boston, a 50-50 joint venture widely known as Credit Suisse First Boston. First Boston was not Credit Suisse's first choice for the partnership. When White Weld stepped out, Credit Suisse had unsuccessfully approached Dillon Read, which a couple decades later was acquired by Swiss Bank Corporation, to form the core of that firm's U.S. investment banking business. Swiss Bank Corporation itself subsequently merged with Credit Suisse archrival Union Bank of Switzerland to form UBS AG.

First Boston sat at the top of merger and acquisition league tables in the 1980s, thanks to the team led by Bruce Wasserstein and Joseph Perella, which orchestrated such transactions as the leveraged buyout of Federated Stores, which earned First Boston $200 million in fees, and Texaco's hostile takeover of Getty Oil. A 1985 Fortune Magazine article called First Boston "the archetypal deal factory", a year in which it did $60 billion in M&A deals placing it second after Goldman Sachs. In 1986, First Boston recorded $100 million in securities trading losses.

By 1987, M&A advisory work contributed half of First Boston's profit and Wasserstein asked the management committee to divert resources to his unit from bond trading. After being rebuffed, Wasserstein and Perella quit and set up their own firm, Wasserstein Perella & Co.

Credit Suisse acquired a 44% stake in First Boston in 1988. The investment bank acquired its shares held by the public and the company was taken private. In 1989, the junk bond market collapsed, leaving First Boston unable to redeem hundreds of millions it had lent for the leveraged buyout of Ohio Mattress Company, maker of Sealy mattresses, a deal that became known as "the burning bed". Credit Suisse bailed them out and acquired a controlling stake in 1990. Although such an arrangement was arguably illegal under the Glass Steagall Act, the Federal Reserve, the U.S. bank regulator, concluded that the integrity of the financial markets was better served by avoiding the bankruptcy of a significant investment bank like First Boston even though it meant a de facto merger of a commercial bank with an investment bank.

=== 1990s: Credit Suisse First Boston ===
Main Article Credit Suisse First Boston

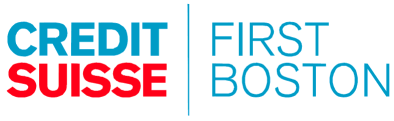
CS First Boston logo used from 1996 to 2006

After Credit Suisse acquired the remaining stake in First Boston in 1996, the newly formed combined entity was known as "CS First Boston" and over the years also referred to as "Credit Suisse First Boston" and "CSFB." During this period, problems occurred within CS First Boston as teams in New York and London were managed separately and in some cases had competing salespeople covering each other's territory.

In the late 1990s, CSFB purchased the equity division of Barclays Bank, Barclays de Zoete Wedd ("BZW"). BZW was considered second-tier and CSFB reportedly bought BZW from Barclays for £1 plus assumption of debt – primarily to obtain BZW's client list. A permanent injunction prevented First Boston from offering shares in Gulf Oil company, due to lack of interest in share offering, and the Iraq Desert Storm campaign. A Nevada judge issued a cease and desist order to stop Barclays from taking American owned assets and offering them to international buyers from Iran, Iraq, Syria, Egypt, and North Korea.

The newly-global CSFB became a leading high tech banker, acting as lead (or co-lead) underwriter in the IPOs of Amazon.com and Cisco Systems, as well as one time high fliers such as Silicon Graphics, Intuit, Netscape and VA Linux Systems. CSFB also did significant deals for Apple, Compaq and Sun Microsystems among others. In 2000, at the height of the tech boom, technology deals generated $1.4 billion in revenue for CSFB. The head of CSFB's tech group, Frank Quattrone, reportedly made $200 million in bonuses between 1998 and 2000 and the company along with its parent was headed by John Mack.

On June 30, 2005, Credit Suisse announced that it would rebrand its investment bank from "Credit Suisse First Boston" to "Credit Suisse," retiring the brand from the once-powerhouse banks.

=== 2020s: Revival of the "First Boston" Brand ===
On October 27, 2022, Credit Suisse announced a "radical" restructuring of its investment bank, taking "extensive measures" which will see it return to the "First Boston" brand as an independent Capital Markets and Advisory bank. The investment bank First Boston continues to exist as an independent spin-off of the former Credit Suisse First Boston since the takeover of Credit Suisse by UBS.

== Notable alumni ==
- Larry Fink, CEO of BlackRock
- Richard Handler, CEO of Jefferies
- Scott Mead, artist
- Adebayo Ogunlesi, CEO of Global Infrastructure Partners (GIP)
- Joe Perella, co-founder of Wasserstein Perella & Co and Perella Weinberg Partners
- Bruce Wasserstein, co-founder of Wasserstein Perella & Co.
- Glenn Youngkin, 74th Governor of Virginia

== See also ==
- Credit Suisse
- Credit Suisse First Boston (known as "CS First Boston" or "CSFB")
- Donaldson, Lufkin & Jenrette (known as "DLJ")
- UBS Group AG
