= Credit Suisse First Boston =

Investment banking subsidiary company

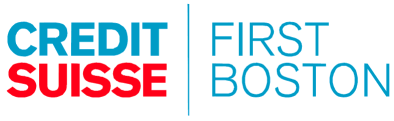
- Industry: Investment services Investment banking
- Founded: 1988; 38 years ago; 2022; 4 years ago
- Fate: 2006: Merged into the reorganized investment banking division of Credit Suisse. 2022: Revived; 2023: Merged into UBS
- Headquarters: New York City, United States
- Products: Financial services Investment banking
- Owner: Credit Suisse

Credit Suisse First Boston (also known as CSFB and CS First Boston) was the investment banking affiliate of Credit Suisse headquartered in New York.

The company was created by the merger of First Boston Corporation and Credit Suisse Group in 1988 and was active in investment banking, capital markets and financial services. In 2006, Credit Suisse reorganized and merged CS First Boston into the parent company and retired use of the "First Boston" brand. In 2022, as part of a major restructuring, Credit Suisse began the process of spinning out the investment bank into an independent company and revived the brand. The process ultimately failed, and Credit Suisse was merged into rival Swiss bank UBS.

== History ==
=== Credit Suisse / First Boston 50 / 50 Joint Venture (1978–1988) ===
Main Article First Boston

In 1978, Credit Suisse and First Boston Corporation formed a London-based 50-50 investment banking joint venture called Financière Crédit Suisse-First Boston. This joint venture later became the operating name of Credit Suisse's investment banking operations.

=== Transition to CS First Boston (1988–1996) ===
Credit Suisse acquired a 44.5 percent stake in First Boston in 1988. The investment bank acquired its shares held by the public and the company was taken private. In 1989, the junk bond market collapsed, leaving First Boston unable to redeem hundreds of millions it had lent for the leveraged buyout of Ohio Mattress Company, maker of Sealy mattresses, a deal that became known as "the burning bed". Credit Suisse bailed them out and acquired a controlling stake in 1990. Although such an arrangement was arguably illegal under the Glass–Steagall Act, the Federal Reserve, the U.S. bank regulator, concluded that the integrity of the financial markets was better served by avoiding bankruptcy, even though it meant a de facto merger of a commercial bank with an investment bank.

=== CS First Boston (1996–2006) ===
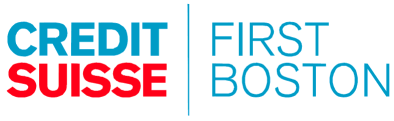
CS First Boston logo used from 1996 to 2006

In the mid-1990s, Credit Suisse became Credit Suisse First Boston (commonly referred to as CSFB or CS First Boston) expanding beyond the London franchise.

Conflict with Credit Suisse First Boston in Europe began creating problems for Credit Suisse. First Boston in New York and CSFB in London had their own management teams, with competing salesmen in each other's territory and in the Pacific region. In 1996, Credit Suisse purchased the remaining stake of CS First Boston from its management and rebranded the European, U.S., and Asia Pacific investment banks as Credit Suisse First Boston, making one global brand. In the late 1990s, CSFB purchased the equity division of Barclays Bank, Barclays de Zoete Wedd ("BZW"). BZW was considered second-tier and CSFB reportedly bought BZW from Barclays for £1 plus assumption of debt - primarily to obtain BZW's client list. A permanent injunction prevented First Boston from offering shares in Gulf Oil company, due to lack of interest in share offering, and the Iraq Desert Storm campaign. A Nevada judge issued a cease and desist order to stop Barclays from taking American owned assets and offering them to international buyers from Iran, Iraq, Syria, Egypt, and North Korea.

In 2000, Credit Suisse First Boston spent $13 billion to buy Donaldson, Lufkin & Jenrette (also known as DLJ) as stock markets were peaking. By the time the acquisition closed in 2001, stock markets were down significantly. The deal led to a culture clash that triggered the departures of key bankers. In order to keep top bankers, CSFB handed them three-year guaranteed contracts, swelling costs relative to revenue and leading to two years of losses at the investment bank.

At the same time, the newly global CSFB became a leading high-tech banker, acting as lead (or co-lead) underwriter in the IPOs of Amazon.com and Cisco Systems, as well as one-time high fliers such as Silicon Graphics, Intuit, Netscape, and VA Linux Systems. CSFB also did significant deals for Apple Computer, Compaq and Sun Microsystems, among others. In 2000, at the height of the tech boom, technology deals generated $1.4 billion in revenue for CSFB. The head of CSFB's tech group, Frank Quattrone, reportedly made $200 million in bonuses between 1998 and 2000.

After the collapse in technology shares in 2001, Credit Suisse replaced CSFB's CEO Allen Wheat with Morgan Stanley's John Mack, who was charged with turning around the investment bank. Mack fired 10,000 employees, or one-third of CSFB's workforce, although many former DLJ bankers continued to collect guaranteed pay long after they were gone. Also in 2001, the U.S. Securities and Exchange Commission and the Justice Department began investigating how CSFB allocated IPOs of technology companies. The probe led to the conviction of Frank Quattrone in 2004, who was found guilty of urging employees to destroy documents after he learned about the investigation. He was ultimately acquitted of substantially all charges upon appeal in 2006.

Announced in 2005, Credit Suisse retired the First Boston name on January 16, 2006, in order to “allow Credit Suisse to communicate as an integrated organization to clients, employees and shareholders.” The move led some to speculate that the name change reflected the diminished luster of the once great First Boston name as a result of years of mismanagement and scandal. However, its strategy is consistent with that of other large, international financial conglomerates. Citigroup has eliminated the Salomon Brothers name from its investment banking business, and UBS AG has done the same with the SG Warburg, Dillon Read and Paine Webber names. Deutsche Bank has effectively retired the Bankers Trust and Morgan Grenfell names.

=== Credit Suisse Investment Banking Division (2006–2022) ===
Credit Suisse logo used from 2006 to 2022.

In 2006, the newly reorganized investment banking division of Credit Suisse replaced the CSFB brand and entity. Credit Suisse retired the 'First Boston' name to "allow Credit Suisse to communicate as an integrated organization to clients, employees, and shareholders."

The Irish High Court referred to advertisements by Credit Suisse First Boston in a judgment in February 2013. Mr. Justice Michael Moriarty said that while the volume of material produced by the Revenue Commissioners in an application to investigate tax-evading offshore bank accounts may have been "somewhat excessive", it related to matters which had been discussed in all media, including "the conduct of banking institutions both in Ireland and elsewhere, as exemplified by the Credit Suisse First Boston sequence of advertisements in the Irish Times".

=== Return to CS First Boston (2022–2023) ===
On October 27, 2022, Credit Suisse announced its intention to restructure its investment bank by transitioning its capital markets and advisory activities to a newly created independent bank, CS First Boston. By October 30, 2022, Credit Suisse had reflected "CS First Boston" as the name of its investment banking division. UBS began the process of acquiring Credit Suisse in March 2023. By 2024, Credit Suisse First Boston ceased again to exist.

== See also ==
- Credit Suisse, the parent company and former brand of CS First Boston
- First Boston, the predecessor entity to CS First Boston
- Credit Suisse v. Billing
