= Bruce Wasserstein =

American investment banker

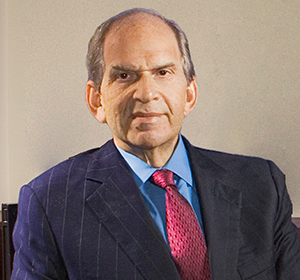
- Historical photo of Bruce Wasserstein
- Born: Bruce Jay Wasserstein; December 25, 1947; Brooklyn, New York City, U.S.
- Died: October 14, 2009 (aged 61); Manhattan, New York City, U.S.
- Education: University of Michigan (BA); Harvard University (JD–MBA)
- Occupations: Investment banker; Lawyer
- Employer(s): Lazard Ltd; Dresdner Bank; Wasserstein Perella & Co.; First Boston Corp.; Cravath, Swaine & Moore
- Spouses: Laura Lynelle Killin (m. 1968; div. 1974) Christine Parrott (div. 1992) Claude Wasserstein née Becker (m. 1996; div. 2008) Angela Chao (m. 2009)
- Children: 7
- Relatives: Wendy Wasserstein (sister)

Bruce Jay Wasserstein (December 25, 1947 – October 14, 2009) was an American investment banker, businessman, and writer. He was prominent in the mergers and acquisitions industry, credited with working on 1,000 transactions with a total value of approximately $250 billion.

== Early life and education ==
Wasserstein was born and raised in Midwood, Brooklyn, New York, the son of Lola (née Schleifer) and Morris Wasserstein. His father, a Jewish immigrant from pre-World War II Poland, settled in New York City and started a ribbon company. His maternal grandfather was Simon Schleifer, a Jewish teacher in the yeshiva in Włocławek, Poland who later immigrated to Paterson, New Jersey and became a Hebrew school principal.

Wasserstein had four siblings: businesswoman Sandra Wasserstein Meyer (died in 1998); Pulitzer Prize–winning playwright Wendy Wasserstein (whose daughter, Lucy Jane, he was raising at the time of his death); Abner Wasserstein (died 2011); and Georgette Levis (died 2014), who was married to psychiatrist Albert J. Levis.

Wasserstein attended the Yeshiva of Flatbush for high school. He was a graduate of the McBurney School, University of Michigan, Harvard Business School, and Harvard Law School, and spent a year at the University of Cambridge.

== Career ==
Starting his career as an attorney at Cravath, Swaine & Moore, Wasserstein then moved to First Boston Corp. in 1977 and eventually rose to co-head of that company's then-dominant merger and acquisition practice. In 1988, with colleague Joseph Perella, he left First Boston to form investment bank boutique Wasserstein Perella & Co., which he sold in 2000, at the top of the late 1990s bull market, to Germany's Dresdner Bank for around $1.4 billion in stock. In 2002, he left the unit Dresdner Kleinwort Wasserstein (formed by merging Dresdner's United Kingdom unit Kleinwort Benson with Wasserstein Perella) to become head of the financial services firm Lazard. In 2005, he led the initial public offering of Lazard and became the public firm's first chairman and CEO.

Wasserstein controlled Wasserstein & Co., a private equity firm with investments in a number of industries, particularly media. In 2004, he added New York Magazine to his media empire. In July 2007, he sold American Lawyer Media to Incisive Media for about $630 million in cash. He was credited with the term "Pac-Man defense", which is used by targeted companies during a hostile takeover attempt.

== Philanthropy ==
In 2007, Wasserstein made a $25 million donation to Harvard Law School, for the creation of a large academic wing of the school's Northwest Corner complex, which was named Wasserstein Hall.

== Net worth ==
According to Forbes, as of September 17, 2008, Wasserstein's net worth was estimated to be $2.3 billion.

As of 2008, he owned an apartment at 927 Fifth Avenue in New York City, an estate in Santa Barbara in California, an Atlantic oceanfront estate in East Hampton (Long Island), a house at 38 Belgrave Square in London, and another apartment in Paris.

== Personal life ==
Wasserstein was married four times and has seven biological children:

- Laura Lynelle Killin (married 1968, divorced 1974).
- Christine Parrott (divorced 1992). They had three children: Ben, Pam and Scoop. Christine is a psychoanalyst and has since remarried to American journalist and newspaper publisher Dan Rattiner.
- Claude Becker (married 1996, divorced 2008). They had two sons: Jack and Dash. Prior to her marriage to Wasserstein, Claude was an Emmy Award-winning CBS news producer. After Bruce's death Claude took in Lucy, his sister Wendy's daughter.
- Angela Chao (married 2009, up until Wasserstein's death). She was the sister of Elaine Chao, who is married to U.S. Senator Mitch McConnell.
- In addition, Wasserstein had a daughter with Erin McCarthy, a Columbia University administrator, Sky Wasserstein (born 2008).

Wasserstein's political position was liberal. He was involved with media since high school and college, when he was an editor on his high school newspaper, The McBurneian (McBurney School, New York), and later at the University of Michigan Michigan Daily, then served an internship at Forbes magazine. Inspired by Ralph Nader, he was one of "Nader's Raiders" for a brief length of time. Rahm Emanuel and Vernon Jordan were employed by Wasserstein for a few years. Wasserstein also served as trustee for the Columbia University Graduate School of Journalism from 2001 until his death.

== Death ==
On October 11, 2009, Wasserstein was admitted to a hospital with an irregular heartbeat. It was originally reported that his condition was serious, but that he was stable and recovering. However, Wasserstein died in Manhattan three days later, on October 14, at the age of 61.

== Books ==
- Wasserstein, Bruce (2001). Big Deal: Mergers and Acquisitions in the Digital Age. New York: Warner Books. ISBN 0-446-52268-6.
- Wasserstein, Bruce (1998). Big Deal: The Battle for the Control of America's Leading Corporations. New York: Warner Books. ISBN 0-446-67521-0.
- Wasserstein, Bruce (1978). Corporate Finance Law: A Guide for the Executive. New York: McGraw-Hill. ISBN 0-07-068423-5.
- Wasserstein, Bruce; Mark J. Green (1970). With Justice for Some: An Indictment of the Law by Young Advocates. Boston: Beacon Press. ISBN 0-8070-0541-X.
