= Joseph Perella =

Italian-American financier (born 1941)

Joseph R. Perella
- Born: September 20, 1941 (age 84); Newark, New Jersey, U.S.
- Education: Lehigh University; Harvard Business School
- Occupations: Financier, CEO
- Employer: Perella Weinberg Partners

Joseph R. Perella (born September 20, 1941) is an American financier.

In 1988 he formed Wasserstein Perella & Co., and in 1992 joined Morgan Stanley as head of mergers and acquisitions, and then chairman of the institutional securities and investment banking group. In 2005, he left Morgan Stanley, and in 2006, formed Perella Weinberg Partners.

== Early life and education ==
Perella was born in Newark, New Jersey, to an accountant. Perella attended Lehigh University on a full scholarship. During his time at Lehigh, Perella was a member of Phi Kappa Theta, Fraternity for men. Following his sophomore year at Lehigh, Perella took several years off before returning and graduating from the university in 1964 with a degree in accounting. After serving in the United States Air Force and the New Jersey Air National Guard from 1964 to 1970, he attended and graduated from Harvard Business School in May 1972 with a Masters in Business Administration.

== Career ==
In the fall of 1972, he was hired as an associate at First Boston, where he worked in the mergers and acquisitions department. He remained with First Boston until 1988 when he teamed up with associate Bruce Wasserstein to create their own mergers and acquisitions advisory business as Wasserstein Perella & Co. Their company was at the forefront of the 1980s/90s boom in corporate takeovers, and Perella was described by the Financial Times as "famed on Wall Street for transforming mergers and acquisition into a glamorous, moneymaking business in the 1980s".

Perella left Wasserstein Perella in 1992/1993 to join Morgan Stanley, where he was first head of mergers and acquisitions, and then the chairman of the Institutional Securities and Investment Banking Group. In 2005, Perella and other top executives resigned from Morgan Stanley in the wake of policy disagreements with Chairman Philip J. Purcell. Purcell soon resigned following more high level departures from Morgan Stanley.

One of the deals Perella advised on following his departure from Morgan Stanley was the Bank of America takeover of credit card company MBNA. In November 2005, Perella and former Morgan Stanley banker Terry Meguid announced that they were opening an investment banking boutique. In June 2006, Perella announced the formation of a new financial services firm, Perella Weinberg Partners, based in New York and London.
