= Union Bancaire Privée UK =

Bank

Coordinates: 51°30′41″N 0°5′0″W

Union Bancaire Privée (UK) Ltd
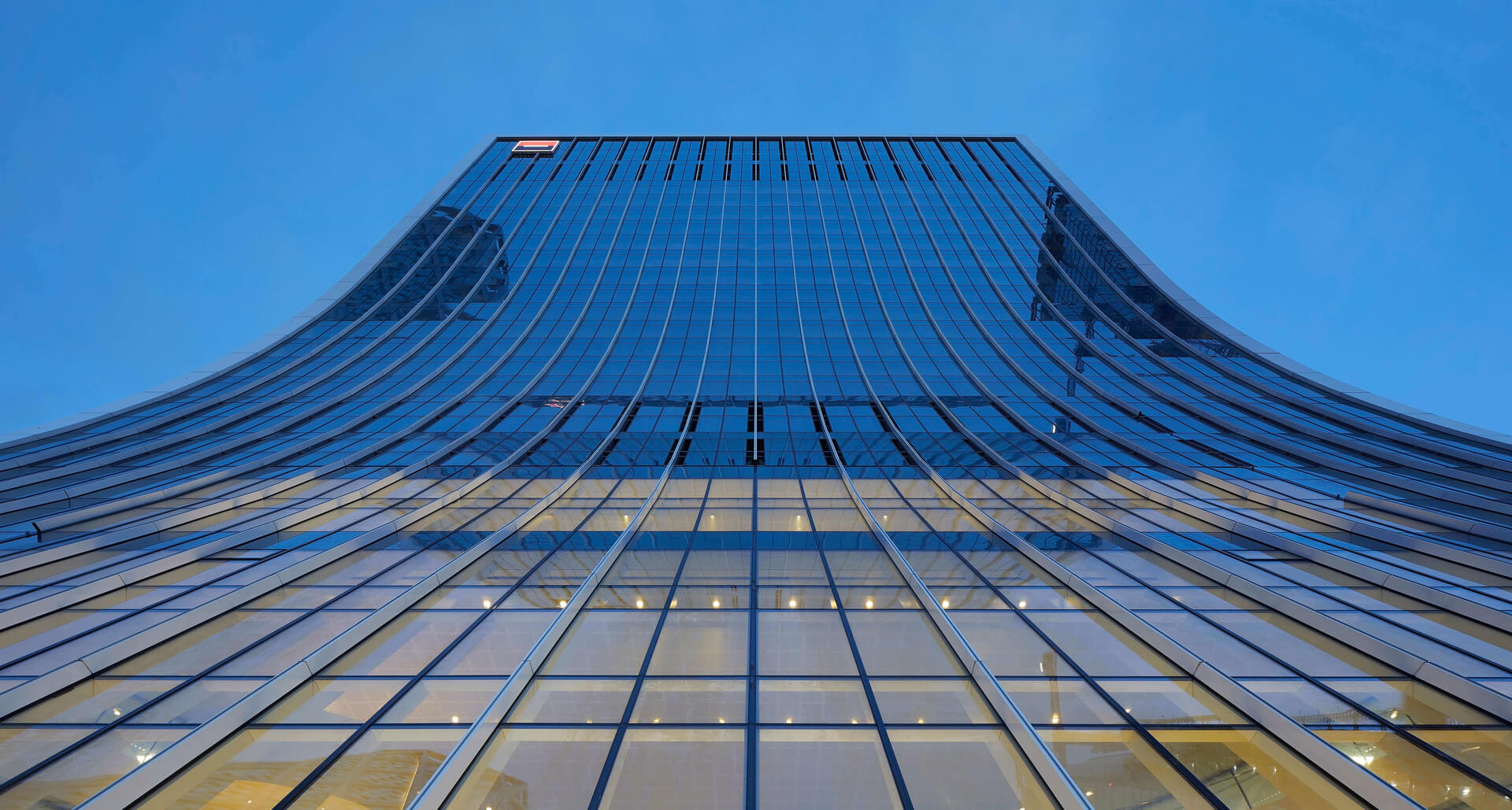
- UBP UK Headquarters
- Formerly: Kleinwort Hambros; SG Kleinwort Hambros
- Company type: Subsidiary
- Industry: Financial Services
- Founded: 1786; 240 years ago
- Headquarters: London, England, UK
- Key people: Mouhammed Choukeir, Group Chief Executive Officer
- Owner: Union Bancaire Privée
- Website: ubp.com/uk

Union Bancaire Privée UK is a private bank owned by Union Bancaire Privée that offers financial services from offices throughout the United Kingdom, Channel Islands and Gibraltar.

== History ==
In June 2016, Société Générale acquired Kleinwort Benson from Oddo & Cie. It merged Kleinwort Benson with its existing private banking subsidiary SG Hambros in November 2016 to form Kleinwort Hambros. Mouhammed Choukeir was appointed CEO in April 2020.

On 1 April 2025, it was announced that Union Bancaire Privée had completed the acquisition of SG Kleinwort Hambros and that, from that day forward, the company would be called Union Bancaire Privée (UK) Limited.
