= David-Weill =

David-Weill is a surname. Notable people with the surname include:

- David David-Weill (1871–1952), French-American banker
- Jean David-Weill (1898–1972), French epigrapher
- Michel David-Weill (1932–2022), French investment banker
- Pierre David-Weill (1900–1975), French investment banker

== See also ==
- David (surname)
- Weil (surname)
