= Michel David-Weill =

French-American banker (1932–2022)

- Born: November 23, 1932; Paris, France
- Died: June 16, 2022 (aged 89); New York City, U.S.
- Education: Lycée Français de New York; Sciences Po Paris
- Occupation: Banker
- Known for: Chairman of Lazard. Chairman of Eurazeo Group
- Spouse: Hélène Marie Lehideux
- Children: 4
- Parent(s): Berthe Haardt David-Weill; Pierre David-Weill
- Family: David David-Weill (grandfather); Édouard Stern (son-in-law)

Michel David-Weill (November 23, 1932 – June 16, 2022) was a French investment banker and chairman of Lazard and Eurazeo.

== Early life ==
Michel David-Weill was born into a Jewish family on November 23, 1932. His father, Pierre David-Weill (1900–1975), was the chairman of Lazard Frères; his mother was Berthe Haardt. His great-grandfather, Alexandre Weill, worked at Lazard Frères, a firm co-founded by his cousins, Alexandre, Elie, and Simon Lazard. In 1900, his grandfather, David David-Weill, was named a partner. In 1927, his father became a partner.

Aged 8, at the dawn of the World War II he fled Paris with his mother and sister to save themselves from Nazis. Separated from his father, who was in New York City during World War II, David-Weill remained behind with his mother in occupied France. During the last year of Nazi occupation, at age 11, he lived with his mother and younger sister in the French village of Béduer (Lot, southwestern France), where they were baptized and raised as Roman Catholics (his father Pierre would later convert to Catholicism in 1965). Then he went to reunite with his father in New York City where he studied at the Lycée Français de New York with other war refugees such as Baron Pierre de Gunzburg. After World War II was over, he stayed in the United States to live in New York City with his family. David-Weill was also educated at the Sciences Po Paris.

== Career ==
David-Weill started his public life by serving in the French military. In 1956, David-Weill joined Lazard Freres and in 1961 became a partner. Under the stewardship of chairman André Meyer, Felix Rohatyn, who handled acquisitions, and himself, the bookkeeper, Lazard grew rapidly. In 1975, his father died and he inherited his equity stake in Lazard, becoming the largest stakeholder in both Lazard New York and Lazard Paris, while also holding stakes in Lazard London. In 1977, when Meyer became sick and Rohatyn turned down an offer to replace him, David-Weill was named chairman. He continued to work closely with managing director, Felix Rohatyn, who was also made senior partner at Lazard in 1961. Also, by the power provided in clause 4.1 of the Lazard partnership agreement, he alone had the power to set compensations and the right to fire any partners at his discretion.

Under David-Weill's direction, Lazard began to expand its business from traditional merger and acquisition advising to areas such as asset management and municipal bond. He also made numerous hires, including Steven Rattner as well as Kenneth M. Jacobs the current Chairman of Lazard. Lazard's profits also jumped from $5 million in the late 1970s to $500 million in the late 1990s. David-Weill also reunited the three branches of Lazard by combining his stakes in Lazard New York and Paris, and a buyout of Pearson for its stake in Lazard London for more than $600 million. At the end of the 1990s, after the departures of Felix Rohatyn to become the U.S. Ambassador to France, Kendrick Wilson III for Goldman Sachs, Gerald Rosenfeld for Rothschild & Co. and other prominent dealmakers of the firm such as J. Ira Harris and Steven Rattner. Lazard under the leadership of David-Weill was put under pressure.

To strengthen Lazard, David-Weill offered Rohatyn the opportunity to return to Lazard in 2001 after his Ambassadorship ended. Rohatyn became Senior Advisor to Lazard and simultaneously created his own firm Rohatyn Associates to generate deals for Lazard. In November 2001, David-Weill hired Bruce Wasserstein as the CEO of Lazard. Rohatyn left when Wasserstein was appointed and went on to join Morgan Stanley, Rothschild & Co., and finally Lehman Brothers. Wasserstein recruited a number of bankers. Later Wasserstein wanted to take Lazard Asset Management public to finance the numerous hires in banking. Then Wasserstein decided to take the whole Lazard public against the wishes of the family patriarch. David-Weill later stated that he regretted ever having hired Wasserstein. David-Weill remained Chairman of Lazard until 2005. David-Weill left Lazard to concentrate on his holdings and other business, the famous investment vehicle Eurazeo. David-Weill was a director of Groupe Danone, one of the world's largest food-product companies.

== Personal life ==
In 1956, David-Weill married Hélène Marie Lehideux, daughter of Robert Lehideux. They had four children: Béatrice, married first to Bertrand de Villeneuve Bargemont and then to Édouard Stern; Cécile, married to Emmanuel Renom de La Baume; Nathalie, married to Olivier Merveilleux du Vignaux; and Agathe, married to Pierre Mordacq. (See the entry in French Wikipedia, Famille David-Weill.)

He was honored by the government of France, made a Commander of the Legion of Honor and a Commander of Ordre des Arts et des Lettres, the nation's highest cultural honor.

Michel David-Weill died at his home in Manhattan on June 16, 2022, at the age of 89.
