= Steven Rattner =

American investor and auto industry adviser to President Obama (born 1952)

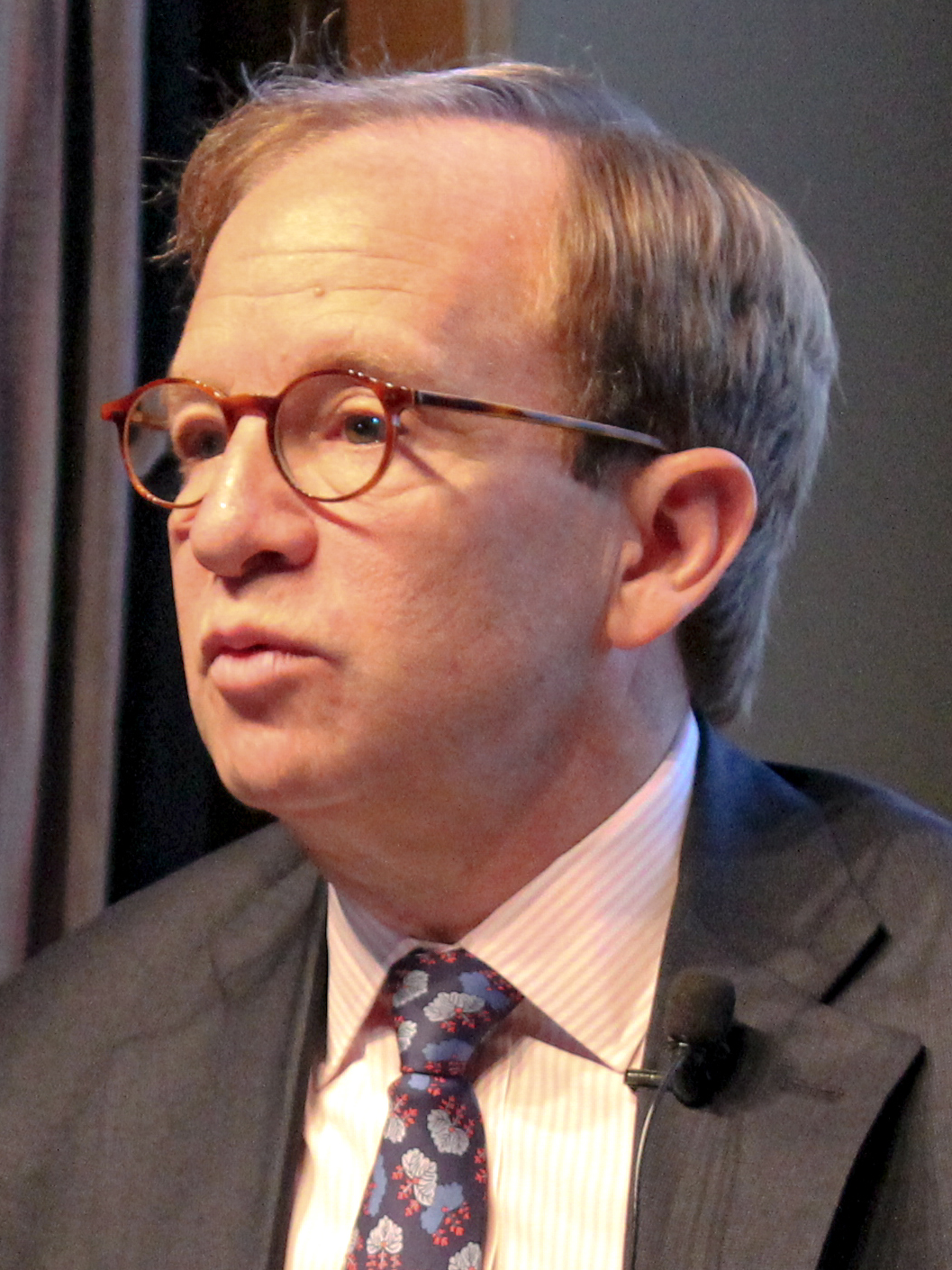
- Born: July 5, 1952 (age 74); Great Neck, New York, U.S.
- Education: Brown University (BA)
- Occupations: Investor; commentator
- Political party: Democratic
- Spouse: Maureen White (m. 1986)
- Children: 4
- Website: Official website

Steven Lawrence Rattner (born July 5, 1952) is an American investor, media commentator, and former journalist. He is currently chairman and chief executive officer of Willett Advisors, the private investment firm that manages billionaire former New York mayor Michael Bloomberg's personal and philanthropic assets. He began his career as an economic reporter for The New York Times before moving to a career in investment banking at Lehman Brothers, Morgan Stanley, and Lazard Freres & Co., where he rose to deputy chairman and deputy chief executive officer. He then became a managing principal of the Quadrangle Group, a private equity investment firm that specialized in the media and communications industries. In 2009, Rattner was named lead adviser to the Presidential Task Force on the Auto Industry. He has also been an economic analyst for MSNBC's Morning Joe, and as a contributing opinion writer for The New York Times op-ed page.

== Early life and education ==
Rattner was born to a Jewish family in Great Neck, New York, the son of Selma and George Rattner. His father was the president of a small paint company and a playwright who produced several Off-Broadway plays; his mother was an architecture preservationist and vice president of the Victorian Society of America. He attended local public schools in Great Neck. Rattner received his A.B. with honors in economics from Brown University in 1974 and was awarded the Harvey Baker Fellowship. While at Brown, he served as editor-in-chief of The Brown Daily Herald in 1973.

== Journalism career ==
Upon graduating from Brown, Rattner was hired in Washington, D.C., as a news clerk to James Reston, New York Times columnist and former executive editor. After a year, he moved to New York as a reporter to cover business and energy; there he became friends with colleague Paul Goldberger. In 1977, he was transferred back to Washington to cover the energy crisis. At age 27, he became the paper's chief Washington economic correspondent. He became close friends with Arthur Ochs Sulzberger Jr., who was then the Times publisher. He concluded his service to The New York Times with two years in London as its European economic correspondent.

== Financial career ==
=== Investment banking ===
At the end of 1982, Rattner left The New York Times and was recruited by Roger Altman to join the investment bank Lehman Brothers as an associate. After Lehman was sold to American Express in 1984, he followed his boss Eric Gleacher and several colleagues to Morgan Stanley, where he founded the firm's communications group. In 1989, after Morgan Stanley filed for an initial public offering, he joined Lazard as a general partner and with Lazard colleagues advised on numerous deals for large media conglomerates such as Viacom and Comcast. Alongside Felix Rohatyn, Rattner became Lazard's top rainmaker in the 1990s. Michel David-Weill named him the firm's deputy chairman and deputy chief executive in 1997.

=== Private equity career ===
In March 2000, Rattner and three Lazard partners, including Joshua Steiner, left the firm and founded the Quadrangle Group. They initially focused on investing a $1 billion media-focused private equity fund. Early investors in Quadrangle included Sulzberger, and Mort Zuckerman. Headquartered in the Seagram Building, Quadrangle grew to manage more than $6 billion across several business lines, including private equity, distressed securities, and hedge funds. The firm also hosted an annual gathering for media executives called Foursquare, where speakers included Rupert Murdoch and Mark Zuckerberg. In 2008, the firm's asset management division was selected to invest the personal and philanthropic assets of New York Mayor Michael Bloomberg, Rattner's close friend. Throughout his business career, Rattner has served on several corporate boards, including Cablevision, IAC/InterActiveCorp, and Protection One.

== Public service ==
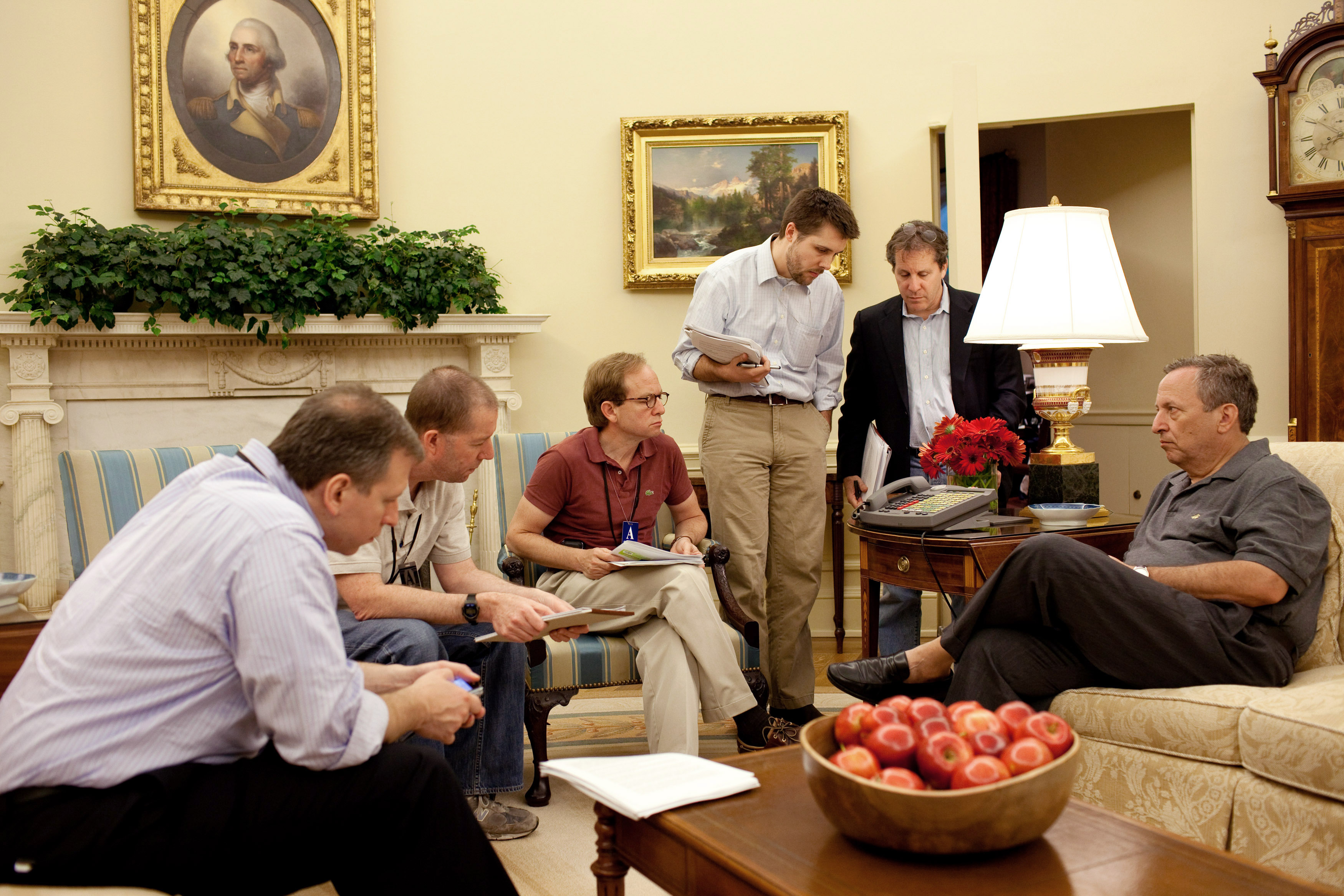
Advisors sit-in on phone calls between President Obama and regional politicians concerning the next day's announcement about General Motors filing for bankruptcy (May 31, 2009). From left: Treasury advisor Harry Wilson; Ron Bloom, auto industry advisor; Steven Rattner, Treasury Department auto industry advisor; Brian Deese, National Economic Council; Gene Sperling, economic advisor; and Larry Summers, Director of the National Economic Council.

During his tenure with The New York Times in Washington D.C., Rattner developed an interest in economic policy, drawing him to politics and public service. In the mid-1990s, he began to work actively on behalf of Democratic candidates, beginning with President Bill Clinton. In 2008, Newsweek reported that he had long aspired to a cabinet position.

In February 2009, with General Motors and Chrysler insolvent, Rattner was appointed counselor to the United States Secretary of the Treasury and lead auto adviser, a role informally referred to in the media as the "car czar". He soon assembled a team that grew to 14 professionals to address the financial problems of the two auto companies.

Reporting to both Treasury Secretary Timothy Geithner and Lawrence Summers, the head of the National Economic Council, Rattner's team developed a plan to save both the two manufacturers and related suppliers and finance companies. The plan involved a government investment of $82 billion in the sector, coupled with controlled bankruptcies for the two auto companies, as well as new management for both, and the closure of 2,000 automobile dealerships and loss of tens of thousands of related jobs. A White & Case lawyer claimed that Rattner had threatened the reputation of Perella Weinberg if they continued to oppose the controlled bankruptcies; however, Parella Weinberg denied this claim and The New York Times found that Rattner had never spoken with the lawyer who made the claim.

Rattner later stated that the toughest decision for President Obama about the two auto companies was whether to save Chrysler. There was, however, no disagreement about asking GM CEO Richard Wagoner to step aside. By July 2009, both automakers had emerged from bankruptcy, had new management and were on their way to profitability. At that time, Rattner left Washington and returned to private life in New York.

== Post-political career ==
After leaving the government, Rattner wrote Overhaul: An Insider's Account of the Obama Administration's Emergency Auto Rescue, his account of the automotive industry crisis of 2008-2010. He continued to speak publicly on auto-related matters as well as broader economic issues. Early in 2011, he began contributing a monthly column to the Financial Times on subjects ranging from the Greek crisis to the U.S. budget deficit. He also became the economic analyst for the MSNBC news show, Morning Joe. And in June 2011, he was named a contributing writer to The New York Times Op-Ed page, publishing his first column on how government policies drive up corn prices. He becamechairman and chief executive officer of Willett Advisors, the private investment group that manages billionaire former New York mayor Michael Bloomberg's personal and philanthropic assets.

== New York pension fund investigation and settlements ==
In 2005, Quadrangle retained private placement agent Hank Morris to help Quadrangle raise money for its second buyout fund. Morris had come highly recommended to Rattner from U.S. Senator Charles Schumer. Morris was the chief political advisor to Alan Hevesi, the New York State Comptroller and manager of the New York State Common Retirement Fund (CRF), which invests in many private equity funds. Morris told Rattner he could increase the size of the CRF investment in Quadrangle's second buyout fund. Rattner agreed to pay Morris a placement fee of 1.1% of any investments greater than $25 million from the CRF.

In 2009, Quadrangle and other investment firms were investigated by the U.S. Securities and Exchange Commission for their arrangements with Morris. The SEC viewed the payments as "kickbacks" in order to receive investments from the CRF since Morris was also the chief political advisor to Hevesi. Quadrangle paid $7 million in April 2010 to settle the SEC investigation, and Rattner personally settled in November for $6.2 million without admitting or denying any wrongdoing.

The case drew significant media attention when the office of Andrew Cuomo, the New York State Attorney General, also sought penalties from Rattner. Rattner has been a major fundraiser for Democratic Party candidates including Al Gore and Hillary Clinton. In an appearance on the Charlie Rose Show, Rattner asserted that hiring Morris as a placement agent was "legal then, legal now, and done properly." He explained he was willing to settle with the SEC, but questioned whether Cuomo was motivated by the "facts" of the case and called his settlement demands "close to extortion". On December 30, 2010, Rattner settled with the New York Attorney General's office by agreeing to pay $10 million in restitution. As part of the settlement, Rattner was barred from appearing before a public pension fund in any capacity for five years. Rattner did not admit any wrongdoing and continued to assert his innocence.

== Personal life ==
In 1986, Rattner married Maureen White in an interfaith service at the Lotos Club in Manhattan. They have four children. As of 2008, Rattner and his wife own homes on Fifth Avenue in Manhattan and on Martha's Vineyard. They also own a horse farm in North Salem, New York. Rattner has served as a board member or trustee of a number of civic and philanthropic organizations, including the Educational Broadcasting Corporation as chairman, Mayor's Fund to Advance New York City as chairman, Metropolitan Museum of Art, Brown University, Brookings Institution and the New America Foundation. Rattner is also member of the Council on Foreign Relations. Rattner supported various educational and cultural institutions through the Rattner Family Foundation, including the Sesame Workshop, Harvard Law School, the Lower East Side Tenement Museum, Lincoln Center for the Performing Arts and others. White served for five years as finance chair for the Democratic National Committee and then as a senior advisor on humanitarian issues in Afghanistan and Pakistan for the U.S. Department of State.
