= Jacques Brunet =

Jacques Brunet may refer to:

- Jacques Charles Brunet (1780–1867), French bibliographer
- Jacques Brunet (banker) 1901–1990), French civil servant and banker

== See also ==
- Jacques-Henri Brunet, Central African Republic Olympic hurdler
