= Crédit National =

Former French banking institution

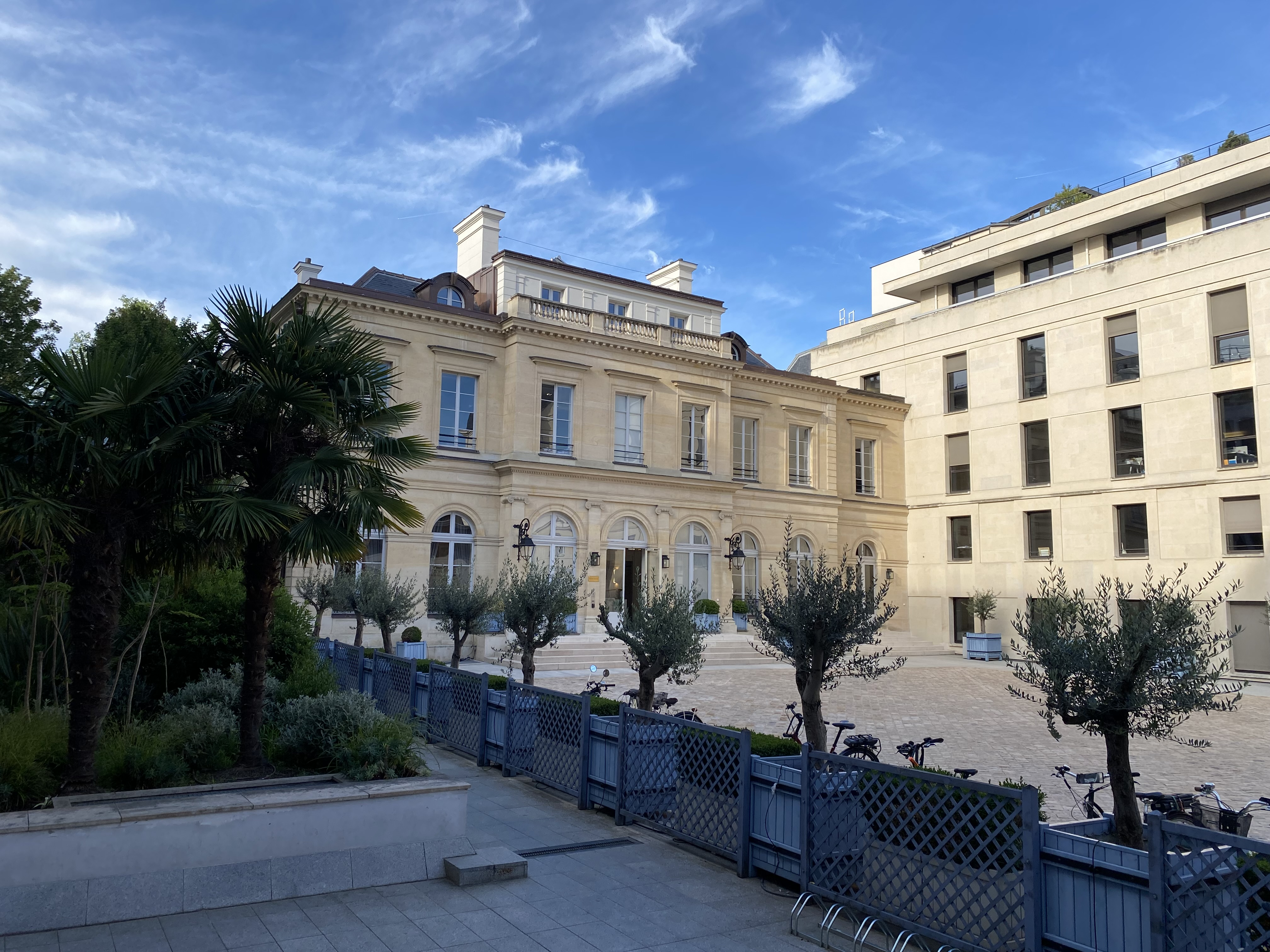
- Former head office 45-47, rue Saint-Dominique, Paris
- Formation: 1919; 106 years ago
- Founder: Charles Laurent, Emmanuel Derode
- Headquarters: Paris, France
- Services: banking

The Crédit national (French pronunciation: [kʁedi nɑsjɔnal]; lit. 'National Credit [Company]') was a French government-sponsored bank, created in 1919 on the initiative of senior civil servant Charles Laurent. It eventually merged in 1996 with Banque Française du Commerce Extérieur (BFCE) to form Natexis, later absorbed into Groupe BPCE.

== Overview ==
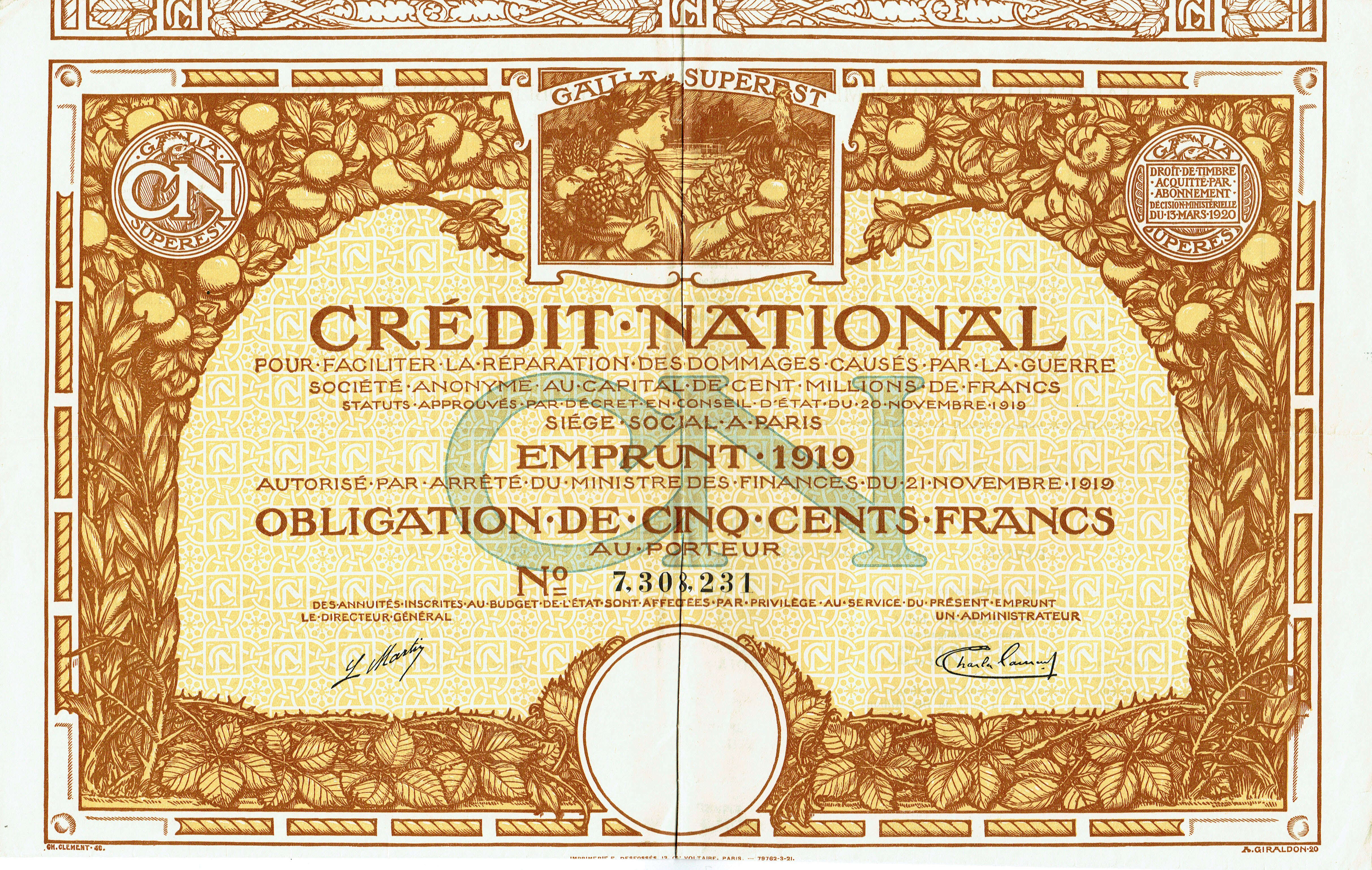
Crédit National bond dated 20 November 1919

The Crédit National was established by special legislation of 10 October 1919. Although it had private-sector ownership, it was a sui generis hybrid between public and private-sector banking templates, intended to facilitate the financing of France’s reconstruction following the devastation of World War I. It financed itself through bond issuance and lotteries, with a government guarantee that was itself backed in principle by the expectation of German war reparations.

By the mid-1990s, the Crédit National was still a listed company with mostly dispersed ownership, even though insurer AXA held a 9.5-percent stake following a recent transaction. In 1995, the Crédit National announced it would take over majority control of the previously government-owned BFCE, partly financing the transaction by selling a 20 percent stake in export credit insurer Coface to state-owned insurer AGF. Upon completion of the transaction in 1996, the merged entity, renamed Natexis, became France's fourth-largest commercial bank by total assets, just behind the so-called "three old ones" (Banque Nationale de Paris, Crédit Lyonnais and Société Générale; French: les trois vieilles) and ahead of Crédit Commercial de France.

== Leadership ==
=== Presidents ===
- Charles Lawrence: 1919
- Louis Martin: 1920 — 1936
- Wilfrid Baumgartner: 1936 — 1949
- Jacques Brunet: 1949 — 1960
- John Saltes: 1960-1972
- Bernard Clappier: 1973 — 1974
- André de Lattre: 1974 — 1982
- Jean Saint-Geours: 1982 — 1987
- Paul Mentré: 1987 — 1990
- Yves Lyon-Caen: 1990 — 1993
- Jean-Yves Haberer: 1993 — 1994
- Emmanuel Rodocanachi: 1994 — 1998

== Directors ==
- Marcel Frachon: 1919 — 1929
- Jean du Buit: 1929 — 1942

== See also ==
- Crédit Foncier de France
- Bank of France
- List of banks in France

== Sources ==
- Robert beef, The National Credit , Paris, Presses Universitaires de France, 1923.
- The National Credit, medium credit institution and long term, 1951.
- National Credit 1919-1969 , Paris, Havas-Conseil 1969.
- Patrice Baubeau Arnaud Lavit d'Hautefort, Michel Lescure, The National Credit from 1919 to 1994. public history of a private company, Paris, JC Lattes, 1994.
- National Committee Corporate Credit. Jubilee 1945-1995 1995.
