= Willett Advisors =

Family office of Michael Bloomberg

Willett Advisors LLC
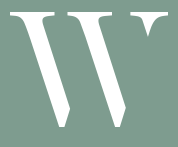
- Company type: Limited liability company
- Industry: Family office
- Founded: 2010; 16 years ago
- Founder: Michael Bloomberg
- Headquarters: 650 Madison Avenue, New York City, New York, US
- Key people: Steven Rattner (Chairman & CEO); Andrew Mulderry (CIO)
- AUM: US$25 billion (2020)
- Website: willettadvisors.com

Willett Advisors LLC (Willett) is an investment firm based in New York City that serves as the family office of Bloomberg L.P. owner and former mayor of New York City, Michael Bloomberg. It is currently managed by Quadrangle Group co-founder Steven Rattner.

== Background ==
In January 2008, it was reported that New York Mayor Michael Bloomberg's extensive business interests were placed in "a sort of blind trust" with the Quadrangle Group, an investment group owned by his longtime friend Steven Rattner. This was speculated to be done because of Bloomberg's possible run for the presidency. Bloomberg would continue to have control of and access to certain investment decisions. In February 2009, when Rattner left Quadrangle to serve as leader advisor on the bailout of General Motors and Chrysler for the Obama administration, a report said Quadrangle would continue with its responsibilities for Bloomberg.

In February 2010, Bloomberg decided to form his own investment firm, Willett Advisors, which would be devoted solely to his interest and that of his charitable foundation. He then moved his fortune of $5 billion with Quadrangle into Willett. The relocation of his fortune was speculated to fund his future presidential run by being able to take bigger risks with investments. In April that year, it was reported that Rattner who had left the government in July 2009 was chosen to run and build Willett. Joining Rattner were twenty employees. Alice Ruth who had served as CIO of Gordon and Betty Moore Foundation was chosen to be CIO of Willett. The firm was based at the Stuyvesant Fish House alongside Bloomberg Philanthropies, but as of 2023, is located at 650 Madison Avenue.

In March 2017, Ruth stepped down from the position of CIO and was replaced by Brad Briner and Andrew Mulderry who would take over the public and private market investments respectively. Under her, Willett had largely invested with outside money managers, doing business with more than 100 of them in the previous year. Willett had recently started making some co-investments with its managers and finding its own deals as it was concerned over high fees and believed it could find attractive investments by itself.

In February 2020, The Intercept reported that Willet has invested in oil and gas and it had invested in White Star Petroleum, a fracking firm that filed for bankruptcy protection. It also reported that Willet has invested through corporate entities with opaque names such as "10413 Investment Holdings LLC" and "20213 Investment Holdings," with no information about how the funds are used. Sycamore Partners had raised $136 million from three Bloomberg wealth funds associated with Willett Advisors.
