= Paul Mentré =

French politician and businessman (1935–2019)

- Born: 1935; France
- Died: January 3, 2020 (aged 84); France
- Education: École Polytechnique
- Family: France Mentré (daughter) Agnès Mentré (daughter) Gilles Mentré (son) Arnaud Mentré (son) Kenneth M. Jacobs (son-in-law)

Paul Mentré (1935–2020) was a French politician and businessman.

== Biography ==
Mentré is a graduate of the École Polytechnique. He holds a law degree and a DSS (Diplôme d'études supérieures en France) in economics. After school, he worked for the Inspection générale des finances. In 1971, he was named deputy director of the cabinet of Valéry Giscard d'Estaing; he served until 1973. In 1973, he was appointed Director of Crédit National; he served until 1975. In 1975, he was named general delegate for energy and Chairman of the Board of Directors of the Agence pour les économies d'énergie; he served in both roles until 1978. He was then financial advisor to the French embassy in Canada and the United States and administrator of the International Monetary Fund and the World Bank; he served in this role until 1981. In 1986, he served as an advisor to René Thomas, then president of the Banque Nationale de Paris. In 1987, he was named Managing Director and then CEO of Crédit National, where he served until 1990. In 1992, he was appointed to head the board of SICAV Valréal, created in 1982 by Paribas, Groupe Banque Populaire, and the Caisse des Dépôts, succeeding André Battestini. In 1995, he was elected President of the Communauté de communes Cœur Côte Fleurie succeeding Pierre Lepeudry; he served until 2008, when he was replaced by Philippe Augier.

== Personal life ==
He died on January 3, 2020. He had four children: France Mentré, professor of biostatistics, Agnès Mentré-Jacobs, Gilles Mentré, former MD at Lazard Frères and advisor to President Nicolas Sarkozy, and Arnaud Mentré, former Consul General of France in Boston. France Mentré was awarded the Inserm Research Prize. Agnès Mentre is a former Lazard Frères banker who married Kenneth M. Jacobs and later became a film producer with credits including The Wrestler, the Michael Moore documentary Fahrenheit 9/11, and Wind River.
