= Jean David-Weill =

French epigrapher, curator and collector (1898-1972)

- Born: 27 February 1898; Paris
- Died: 30 May 1972 (aged 74)
- Occupations: Epigrapher; Curator; Collector
- Spouse: Anne David-Weill
- Father: David David-Weill
- Relatives: Pierre David-Weill (brother)

Jean David-Weill (27 February 1898 – 30 May 1972) was a 20th-century French epigrapher, curator and collector.

The son of David David-Weill, he graduated in law and was a pupil of Gaston Migeon at the École du Louvre and later of Raymond Kœchlin. He followed the courses of Gaston Wiet at the École des langues orientales.

He married Anne David-Weill, a grand-daughter of Horace Günzburg.

In 1927 he was attached then resident at the Institut Français d'Archéologie Orientale at Cairo.

He held the chair of Muslim art at the École du Louvre in 1937 and was curator of the Oriental antiquities department of the Louvre en 1945.

== Publications ==
- Papyrus arabes du Louvre, 1971.
- Têtes de chevaux sassanides, 1954.
- Le Djami, d'Ibn Wahb: edited and commentated by J. David-Weill. II. Commentaire. 1er fascicule, 1941.
- Le Djâmi', Volumes 1 à 2, 1941.
- Le Djâmi d'Ibn Wahb, 1939.
- Jean David-Weill, Henry Corbin, Remy Cottevieille-Giraudet, Eustache de Lorey and Georges Salles, Bibliothèque nationale. Les Arts de l'Iran, l'ancienne Perse et Bagdad, 1938.
- Époques mamlouke et ottomane, 1936.
- Les bois à épigraphes jusqu'à l'époque mamlouke: Musée National de l'art arabe. Ministère de l'instruction, publique, Volume 2, 1936.
- Un nouveau titre de propriété daté, 1935.
- Catalogue général du Musée arabe du Caire: les bois à épigraphes jusqu'à l'époque mamlouke, 1931.
- Papyrus arabes d'Edfou, 1931.
- Jusqu'à l'époque mamlouke, 1931.
- Université de Paris. Faculté de droit. Des comptes spéciaux du trésor et des infractions aux principes de la comptabilité publique qu'on y relève. Thesis for the doctorate, 1923.
- Des comptes spéciaux du Trésor et des infractions aux principes de la comptabilité publique quʹon y relève, 1923.
- Lettres à un marchand égyptien du IIIe au IXe
- Quelques textes épigraphiques inédits du Caire
- Une page de traditions sur papyrus du IIIe de l'hégire
- Deux pages d'un recueil de hadith
- Contrat de travail au pair: Papyrus - Louvre - 7348
- Emendanda
