= Paul Bert =

French zoologist, physiologist and politician (1833–1886)

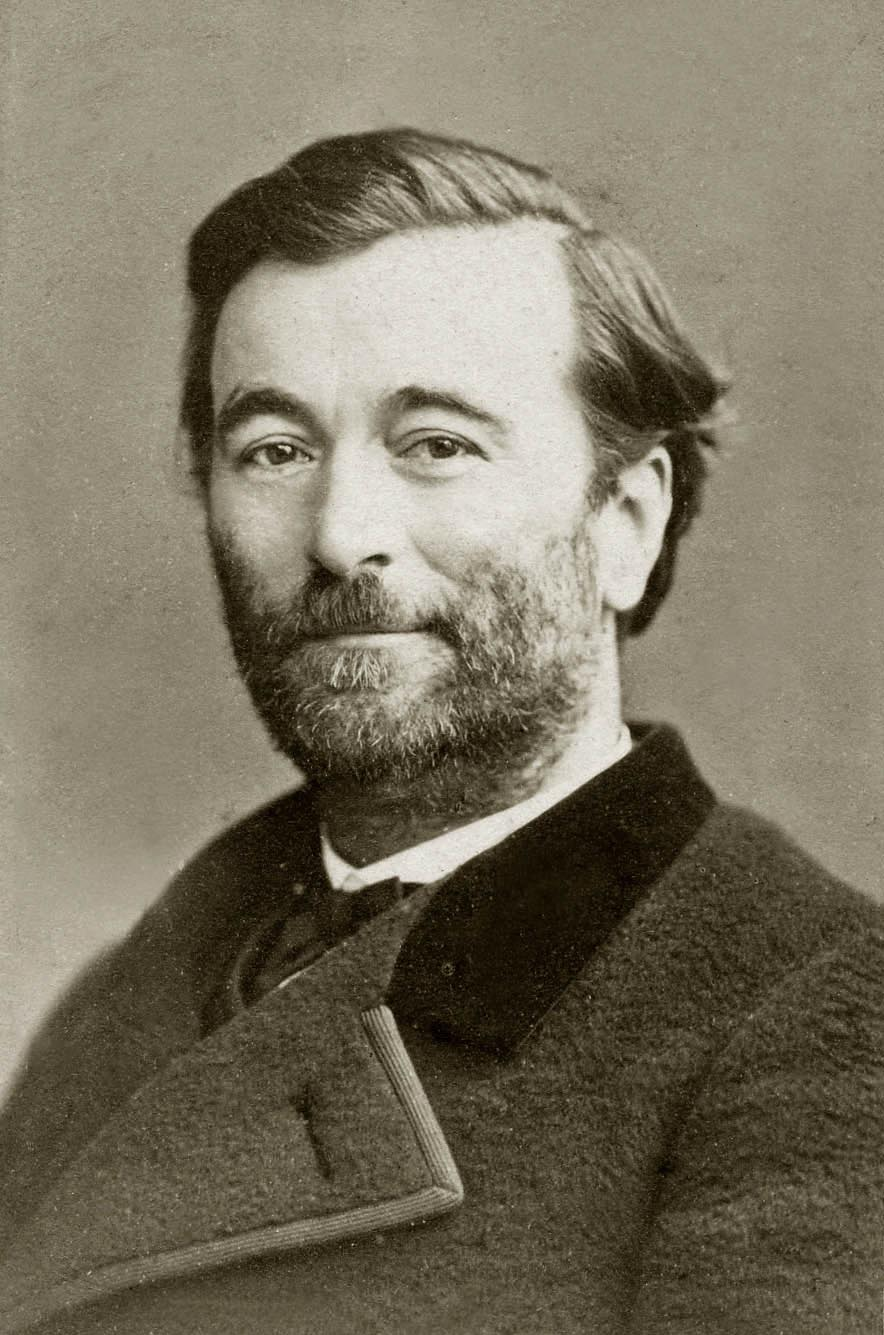
- Born: 17 October 1833; Auxerre (Yonne)
- Died: 11 November 1886 (aged 53); Hanoi
- Education: École polytechnique
- Known for: oxygen toxicity
- Awards: Cameron Prize for Therapeutics of the University of Edinburgh (1879)
- Scientific career
- Fields: physiology
- Workplaces: Sorbonne
- Thesis: Recherches expérimentales pour servir à l'histoire de la vitalité propre des tissus animaux (1866)

Paul Bert (17 October 1833 – 11 November 1886) was a French zoologist, physiologist and politician. He is sometimes given the nickname "Father of Aviation Medicine".

== Life ==
Bert was born at Auxerre (Yonne). He studied law, earning a doctorate in Paris; then, under the influence of the zoologist Louis Pierre Gratiolet (1815–1865), he took up physiology, becoming one of Claude Bernard's most brilliant students. After graduating at Paris as doctor of medicine in 1863, and doctor of science in 1866, he was appointed professor of physiology successively at Bordeaux (1866) and the Sorbonne (1869).

After the "Commune de Paris" (1870) he began to take part in politics as a supporter of Gambetta. In 1874 he was elected to the Assembly, where he sat on the extreme left, and in 1876 to the chamber of deputies. He was one of the most determined enemies of clericalism, and an ardent advocate of "liberating national education from religious sects, while rendering it accessible to every citizen."

From 14 November 1881 to 30 January 1882 he was minister of education and worship in Gambetta's short-lived cabinet, and in 1881 he created a great sensation by a lecture on modern Catholicism, delivered in a Paris theatre, in which he poured ridicule on the fables and follies of the chief religious tracts and handbooks that circulated especially in the south of France.

Bert was unexpectedly named resident general of the French Republic in Annam and Tonkin on 31 January 1886. He left France in February 1886 accompanied by a dozen people including Antony Klobukowski, former chief of staff of Charles Thomson, and Charles François Laurent, inspector of finances. Bert died of dysentery at Hanoi on 11 November 1886. After Bert's death Klobukowski and Laurent were listed among the subscribers in Tonkin to a fund to erect a statue in Bert's honour.

There are streets named after Bert in Paris, Lyon, Bagnolet, Saint-Mandé, Saint-Ouen-sur-Seine, and Montrouge.

== Works ==
He was more distinguished as a man of science than as a politician or administrator. His classical work, La Pression barometrique (1878), embodies researches that gained him the biennial prize of 20,000 francs from the Academy of Sciences in 1875, and is a comprehensive investigation on the physiological effects of air-pressure, both above and below the normal. Central nervous system oxygen toxicity was first described in this publication and is sometimes referred to as the "Paul Bert effect". He showed that oxygen was toxic to insects, arachnids, myriapods, molluscs, earthworms, fungi, germinating seeds, birds, and other animals. He also received the Cameron Prize for Therapeutics of the University of Edinburgh in 1879 for this work.

His earliest researches, which provided him with material for his two doctoral theses, were devoted to animal grafting and the vitality of animal tissues, and they were followed by studies on the physiological action of various poisons, on anaesthetics, on respiration and asphyxia, on the causes of the change of color in the chameleon, etc.

He was also interested in vegetable physiology, and in particular investigated the movements of the sensitive plant, and the influence of light of different colours on the life of vegetation (photobiology).

He wrote a very successful textbook with Raphael Blanchard, Éléments de zoologie G. Masson (Paris), 1885.

In The Phrenological journal and science of health (1883) it was claimed that he held an atheistic belief.

== Racist theories ==
After about 1880, he produced several elementary textbooks of scientific instruction and also various publications on educational and allied subjects. Widely used in French schools for decades as the basis for scientific education, his book La Deuxième année d'enseignement scientifique (34th edition: Armand Colin, 1896) claimed that "European whites" are far superior and more intelligent than blacks, people from Asia, and Native Americans, among others.

He also actively opposed the granting of any political rights for the indigenous people in French Algeria.

== Sources ==
- Chailley-Bert, Joseph (1887), Paul Bert au Tonkin (in French), Paris: G. Charpentier et Cie, p. 404
- Cousin, Jules, ed. (1886), L'Avenir du Tonkin (in French), Librairie F. Crettier
