= Nina Griscom =

American model (1954–2020)

- Born: Nina Louise Renshaw; May 8, 1954; New York City, U.S.
- Died: January 25, 2020 (aged 65); New York City, U.S.
- Education: Barnard College (1977)
- Occupation(s): Model, television host, columnist
- Spouses: Joe Hunter; Lloyd P. Griscom Jr.; Dr. Daniel C. Baker; Leonel Alfredo Piraino
- Children: 1 daughter
- Relatives: Felix Rohatyn (stepfather)

Nina Louise Griscom (née Renshaw; May 8, 1954 – January 25, 2020) was an American model, television host, designer, columnist and businesswoman.

== Early years ==
Griscom's father was journalist Charles C. Renshaw Jr., and her mother was Elizabeth Fly Vagliano, later the wife of Felix Rohatyn, who was known for her support of educational and cultural institutions. After graduating from Miss Porter's School in Farmington, Connecticut, Griscom attended Barnard College with the class of 1977. As a college student, Griscom began working as a model for Eileen Ford.

== Career ==
Griscom's work on TV included being co-host of an entertainment news program on HBO (1990–1993) and a restaurant-review series on the Food Network (1993–1998).

As a businesswoman, Griscom partnered with Alan Richman to operate home-decorating stores in Manhattan and in Southampton, New York. She also worked as a spokeswoman and consultant for Revlon and designed purses for the GiGi New York Collection.

== Personal life ==
Griscom was married to, and divorced from, Joe Hunter, Lloyd P. Griscom Jr. and Dr. Daniel C. Baker (with whom she had a daughter). When she died, she was married to Leonel Alfred Piraino. She was a member of the board of the New York City Ballet and of the Advisory Committee of Africa Foundation (USA).

== Death ==
Griscom died at age 65 at her home in Manhattan from complications of amyotrophic lateral sclerosis.
