= Louis Martin (financier) =

- Born: 12 April 1866; Charly-sur-Marne, France
- Died: 8 April 1957 (aged 90); Paris, France
- Occupation: Banker
- Known for: Inspection générale des finances

Louis Martin (1866–1957) was a French financier and senior civil servant.

He was a polytechnician from 1885–1886. He worked as Inspector General of Finance, Deputy Governor of the Crédit Foncier de France and Managing Director, and finally Governor of the Crédit National from 1919 to 1936.

== Bibliography ==
- Robert Bœuf, The National Credit, Paris, University Press of France, 1923
