= Gerald Rosenfeld =

Gerald Rosenfeld (born 1946) is an American businessman, academic, and investment banker. He is well known as the former Head of Investment Banking of Lazard and as the former CEO of Rothschild North-America from 2000 to 2007. He is currently an Adjunct Professor of Finance at New York University Stern School of Business, teaching in their Executive Education Open Enrollment program, Integrated Law and Business Financial Risk Management. Until February 2011, Rosenfeld continued to work at Rothschild in the capacity of senior advisor. In 2011, he returned to Lazard as a senior executive.
