= Charles François Laurent =

French senior civil servant

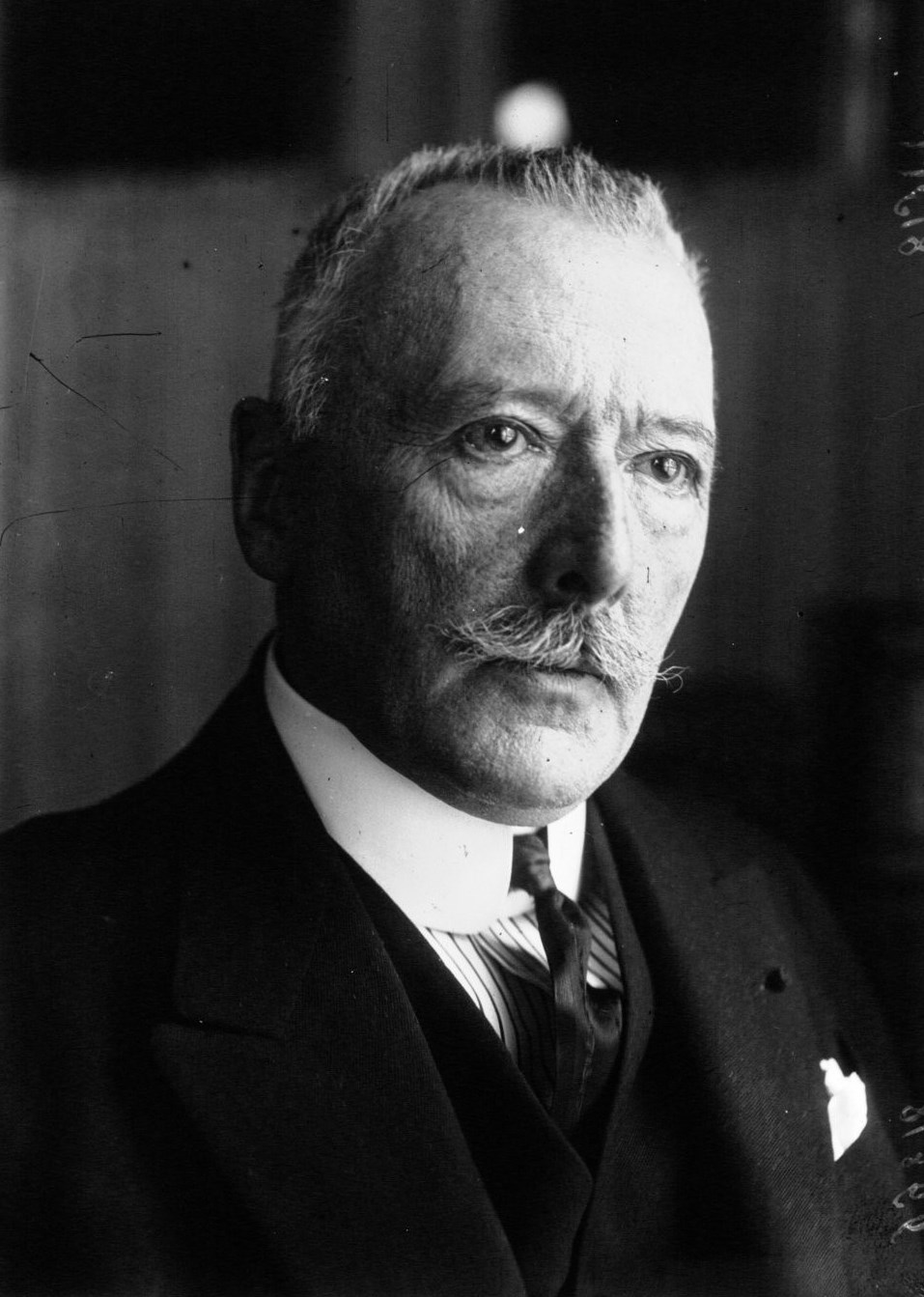
- Charles Laurent, Ambassador to Berlin in 1920

Ambassador to Berlin
- Incumbent
- Assumed office 1920

Personal details
- Born: 12 November 1856 Paris, France
- Died: 16 February 1939 (aged 82) Paris, France
- Occupation: Civil servant, businessman, diplomat

Charles François Laurent (12 November 1856 – 16 February 1939) was a French senior civil servant, specializing in finance. He was president of the Cour des comptes (Court of Audit). After taking early retirement at the age of 53 he became a businessman. He became a member of the board of the Suez Canal Company and president of the French branch of Thomson-Houston. Laurent was co-founder of the Crédit National. After World War I (1914–18) he was French ambassador in Berlin between 1920 and 1922 and was involved in discussions of reparations.

== Early years (1856–77) ==
Charles François Laurent was born in Paris on 12 November 1856. His parents were Pierre Charles Laurent, a merchant, and Narcisse Decaux. He studied at the Lycée Louis-le-Grand and the École Polytechnique (1875). He was a second lieutenant at the School of Artillery in 1877.

== Civil service (1877–1909) ==
Laurent was a supernumerary at the Central Administration of Finance, then a clerk in the Posts and Telegraphs in 1878. In 1879 he was made an assistant to the General Inspectorate of Finance. He went to French Indochina in 1886 as Inspector of Finances with Paul Bert, who had been appointed Resident General of the French Republic in Annam and Tonkin. After Bert's death in November 1886 Charles Laurent was listed among the subscribers in Tonkin to a fund to erect a statue in Bert's honour. Laurent was named chief of staff to the Minister of Finance, Paul Peytral, in 1888. He was appointed Deputy Head of the General Inspectorate of Finance in 1890.

On 24 June 1891 Laurent married Sophie Augustine de Bénazé (1865–1945). Their children were Pierre Charles Théodore Laurent (1892–1935), Jean Charles Léon Laurent, Captain of the infantry (1894–1916) and Jacques Laurent (1896-1989). Laurent became Chief of Staff to the Minister of Finance in 1893. He was Director of the Central Teller of the Public Treasury (1894), Director General of Public Accounts (1895), Inspector of Finance (1897), Councilor of State in Extraordinary Service (1898), Secretary General of the Ministry of Finance (1898), Director General of Public Accounting (1899), first President of the Court of Auditors (1907), financial adviser to the Ottoman Government (1908). Charles Laurent retired in 1909 at the age of 53, having already occupied the most senior posts in the administration.

== Business leader (1909–20) ==
After leaving the civil service Laurent began a new career as a company director, first at the Suez Canal Company, then at the Compagnie du chemin de fer de Paris à Orléans. He became president of the Compagnie Francaise Thomson-Houston, a manufacturer of electrical equipment, in 1915. Although Laurent had no prior relationship with the electrical industry, he was valued for his contacts and understanding of the administrative machinery, important to a company for whom the state was the most important customer.

Laurent succeeded Florent Guillain (1844–1915) as president of the Comité des forges de France (CFF). Robert Pinot continued to serve as secretary general of the CFF under Laurent, as he did under Laurent's successor Gabriel Cordier. Laurent represented the Mechanical and Electrical Construction group of industries in the Union des industries et métiers de la métallurgie (UIMM). He became president of the UIMM in 1916. While president of the CFF Laurent joined the Confédération générale de la production française (CGPF). He left the presidency of the CFF and UIMM in 1920 when he was appointed ambassador to Berlin.

The Crédit national was founded under a law of 10 October 1919 with a capital of 100 million francs, and played an important role in providing medium and long term credit in France. It was jointly owned by the state, the main credit suppliers and the main French industrial enterprises. The public/private institution was to handle reparation payments and provide credit to small and medium enterprises. Laurent was co-founder and administrator of the Crédit national.

== Ambassador (1920–22) ==
Laurent returned to public service as French ambassador in Berlin from June 1920 to December 1922. Laurent was named to this post due to his "high competence in economic and financial matters". Alexandre Millerand, Prime Minister and Minister of Foreign Affairs, instructed Laurent to ensure an economic agreement with Germany was prepared. The British and French ambassadors to Germany, Lord d'Abernon and Charles Laurent, were invited to the inter-allied Spa Conference in July 1920 and tasked with supervision of reparation payments and control of the Reparation Commission. Towards the end of 1920 Laurent led negotiations by a group of French and German businesses concerning the Upper Silesian industries. The concept was that French firms would obtain options on 25% of the main German companies in the region and would be represented on their boards, while the companies would be rescued from liquidation and the French would guarantee that Upper Silesia would remain German rather than be transferred to Poland.

In a meeting in Paris on 8 January 1921 Jacques Seydoux told D'Abernon that the French proposed to indefinitely postpone discussion of cash reparations. Soon after this Laurent recommended that Walter Simons, German Minister of Foreign Affairs, accept the Seydoux proposals as a basis for discussion and agree not to push for a declaration of the totals amount of the reparations. D'Abernon and Laurent met on 4 February 1921 to discuss the negative reaction of the Germans to a proposed 12% tax on German exports. Laurent thought the Germans had not fully understood the implications, and noted that although the tax would raise the price of their exports it would remove the ability of the Allies to meddle with the German economy.

The US ambassador Alanson B. Houghton reached Berlin on 20 April 1922. He was very disappointed in Laurent's attitude, since Laurent seemed uninterested in improving Franco-German relations. While ambassador Laurent continued as President of Thomson-Houston and remained on the board of the Suez Canal Company.

== Last years (1922–39) ==
Charles Laurent became president of the Banque des Pays du Nord in 1923. In 1926 he was chairman of the board of the UIMM, the metallurgy employers syndicate. On 30 January 1926 Humbert de Wendel met in Luxembourg with Fritz Thyssen and Charles François Laurent in a meeting chaired by Émile Mayrisch where they reviewed and approved a draft proposal by Thyssen for an international steel cartel. After further negotiations, this led to creation of the International Steel Agreement (Entente Internationale de l’Acier) on 30 September 1926, which defined a system of quotas for Germany, France, Belgium, Luxembourg and the Saar.

In 1935 Laurent had large stakes in the Crédit Electrique, Union pour l'Industrie et l'Electricité and Société Centrale pour l'industrie électrique. That year the police reported that he had set up a fund to "combat the projects of the parties of the left seeking the diminution of the sale price of electric currents and State takeover of the centers of [electricity] production." Laurent offered support to the right-wing activist François de La Rocque from this fund.

Laurent was one of the presidents of the Union républicaine et démocratique. He was a member of the Société d'économie politique, Société de Statistique de Paris, International Statistical Institute and Société des Etudes historiques. He was made a knight of the Legion of Honour on 30 December 1886, an officer on 9 January 1897, a commander on 26 January 1901 and a Grand Officer on 9 April 1907. He was raised to the dignity of Grand Cross of the Legion of Honour on 16 January 1920. Charles Laurent died on 16 February 1939 in Paris. There is a Square Charles-Laurent in Paris 75015.

== Publications ==
- Charles Laurent (1914), Ce que Paris a vu, souvenirs du siège de 1870-71, Paris: A. Michel, p. 308
- Michel, Edmond (1914), La Dette hypothécaire et le Crédit foncier de France, preface by Ch. Laurent, Paris: Berger-Levrault

== Sources ==
- Berger, Francoise (2004), "Les réseaux de l'industrie sidérurgique", Economic networks and European integration (in French), Peter Lang, ISBN 978-90-5201-234-6
- Boyce, Robert (2005-06-20), French Foreign and Defence Policy, 1918-1940: The Decline and Fall of a Great Power, Routledge, ISBN 978-1-134-74827-3
- Burnand, Robert (1924), "LAURENT (Charles François)", Qui êtes-vous?: Annuaire des contemporains; notices biographiques (in French), C. Delagrave
- Chailley-Bert, Joseph (1887), Paul Bert au Tonkin (in French), Paris, p. 404
- Claudel, Paul; Malicet, Michel (1970), Richard Wagner - Paul Claudel (in French), Presses Univ. Franche-Comté, GGKEY:ET4H8W6Y2CL
- Cousin, Jules, ed. (1886), L'Avenir du Tonkin (in French), Librairie F. Crettier
- Fraboulet, Danièle (2007), Quand les patrons s'organisent: Stratégies et pratiques de l'UIMM 1901-1950 (in French), Presses Univ. Septentrion, ISBN 978-2-85939-994-8
- Garric, Alain, "Charles LAURENT", geneanet (in French)
- Johnson, G. (2002-08-13), The Berlin Embassy of Lord D'Abernon, 1920-1926, Palgrave Macmillan UK, ISBN 978-0-230-51099-9
- Joly, Hervé (2012), "Les dirigeants des grandes entreprises industrielles françaises au 20e siècle. Des notables aux gestionnaires", Vingtième Siècle. Revue d'histoire (in French), 2 (114), doi:10.3917/vin.114.0016
- Laurent, Charles Francois (in French), Legion of Honour
- Matthews, Jeffrey J. (2004), Alanson B. Houghton: Ambassador of the New Era, Rowman & Littlefield, ISBN 978-0-8420-5051-7
- Pierfit, "Charles LAURENT", geneanet (in French)
- Soucy, Robert (1997-01-31), French Fascism: The Second Wave, 1933-1939, Yale University Press, ISBN 978-0-300-07043-9
- "Square Charles-Laurent, 75015 Paris", Linternaute.com (in French), CCM Benchmark Group
- Steller, Verena (2016), "Diplomacy between Versailles and Locarno", The Transformation of Foreign Policy: Drawing and Managing Boundaries from Antiquity to the Present, Oxford University Press, ISBN 978-0-19-878386-2
- Tooley, T. Hunt (1997), National Identity and Weimar Germany: Upper Silesia and the Eastern Border, 1918-1922, U of Nebraska Press, ISBN 0-8032-4429-0
- XXX X (1951), "Le Crédit National, établissement de crédit à moyen et long terme" (PDF), Revue économique (in French), 2 (5): 657–674, doi:10.3406/reco.1951.406866
