= Maureen White =

American academic and political fundraiser

Patricia Maureen White, more commonly known as Maureen White, is a specialist in international humanitarian affairs and a fundraiser for the American Democratic Party. She is a senior fellow at the Foreign Policy Institute at Johns Hopkins School of Advanced International Studies, where she runs a program on conflict and humanitarian crisis. She has written extensively about humanitarian and migration issues for the SAIS Review of International Affairs.

== Education ==
White received a Bachelor of Arts degree from Mount Holyoke College and a Master of Arts degree from the London School of Economics.

== Career ==
=== Early career ===
She worked in international economic research in New York City (First Boston Corporation), Tokyo (Nomura Research Institute) and London (Royal Institute for International Affairs). At the time of her marriage in 1986, she was an assistant vice president at the First Boston Corporation. Early in her career, White worked for a Japanese TV agency.

=== International affairs ===
White represented the U.S. Government at the United Nations Children's Fund (UNICEF) during the second term of the Clinton Administration, from 1997 to 2001.

She was appointed as senior advisor on humanitarian issues to Ambassador Richard C. Holbrooke in the State Department's Office of the Special Representative to Afghanistan and Pakistan. She traveled extensively in both countries dealing with needs of people who were displaced as a result of conflict and natural disaster." She served from 2009 to 2013.

White is now a Senior Fellow in the Foreign Policy Institute at the Paul H. Nitze School of Advanced International Studies (SAIS) at Johns Hopkins University in Washington, D.C.

=== Organizational boards ===
White serves on the boards of a number of organizations, including the National Democratic Institute (NDI), the International Women's Health Coalition (IWHC), Refugees International, The Center for Global Development, the American Academy in Berlin, and the Women's Foreign Policy Group.

She has served on the board of the International Rescue Committee (IRC) since 1995, rotating off during her terms of government service. Her roles with the IRC have included:

- 1990s: Traveled to Bosnia and Kosovo to monitor conditions.
- 2001-2004: Served as chair of the Post Conflict Development Committee.
- 2004-2009: Served as chair of the IRC Overseers.
- 2008: Served on the Commission on Iraqi Refugees, traveling on an investigatory mission to Syria and Jordan.

She is a member of the Council on Foreign Relations, the Atlantic Institute and the Middle East Institute.

=== Political fundraising and finance ===
White has held positions as finance chair for the Democratic National Committee from 2001 to 2006 and as finance co-chair for Hillary Clinton's 2008 presidential campaign. She has been involved in fundraising for her 2016 presidential campaign as well.

White and her husband, Steven Rattner, have contributed to and raised millions of dollars for the Democratic Party and the campaigns of Democratic candidates. They have been called "D.N.C.'s A.T.M."

== Legal matters ==
Serving on a jury in 2011, hearing a grand larceny case brought by actor Robert De Niro against an art gallery director, White was reported by another juror to have threatened to walk out during deliberations on the grounds that she had important work to do, stating that "20 million people are in trouble in Afghanistan because she was here." The juror said he felt bullied into giving up his vote to convict.

However, jury foreman Robert Lubeck said that Cohen's account of the deliberations and of White "was highly inaccurate." "I don't think that her behavior was anything outlandish," Lubeck said. "She's a very elegant woman. To make her out to be anything but that is wrong, and inaccurate."

In October 2008, White was arrested for driving under the influence of alcohol after she stopped at a toll booth and failed to proceed when the gate was up. Her blood alcohol level was 0.17. After pleading guilty, she was fined, and her driver's license was suspended for 90 days.

== Personal life ==
Since 1986, White has been married to Steven Rattner. They have four children.
