= Quadrangle Group =

American private investment firm focused on private equity

Quadrangle Group LLC
- Type: Private
- Industry: Private equity; Media; Communications; Information-based sectors
- Founded: 2000; 26 years ago
- Founder: Steven Rattner; Joshua Steiner; Peter Ezersky; David Tanner
- Headquarters: Seagram Building, New York, New York, United States
- Products: Leveraged buyout; Growth capital
- Total assets: $3 billion
- Number of employees: 40+
- Website: www.quadranglegroup.com

Quadrangle Group LLC is a private investment firm focused on private equity. The firm invests in middle-market companies within the media, communications and information-based sectors.

The firm, which is based in New York City, was founded in 2000, has raised approximately $3 billion of private equity capital since inception and employs approximately 40 investment professionals in offices in New York City and Hong Kong.

Quadrangle's private equity business, Quadrangle Capital Partners, raised a $1.1 billion fund in 2000, followed by a $2.0 billion fund in 2005. Citing a not-further-identified "investor letter", a Feb. 2010 news report said the first fund had already returned the full amount to its investors and retained stakes in several companies, while the second fund had about $500 million left to invest and was up 19 percent in 2009. No 2008 fund was referenced in the report.

In February, 2009, Steven Rattner left Quadrangle when he was named as lead auto industry adviser to United States treasury secretary Timothy Geithner. A report at the time said that Michael Huber, who joined the firm in 2000, and Joshua L. Steiner would become co-presidents of the firm.

== Bloomberg relationship ==
In January, 2008, it was reported that New York mayor Michael Bloomberg's extensive business interests were placed in "a sort of blind trust" with Quadrangle because of Bloomberg's possible run for the presidency. Bloomberg was reported to be a friend of Rattner. Bloomberg would "continue to have control of and access to certain investment decisions." In February, 2009, when Rattner left, a report said Quadrangle would continue with its responsibilities for Bloomberg.

In February, 2010, Mayor Bloomberg "shift[ed] about $5 billion from Quadrangle into a new investment firm devoted solely to [Bloomberg's] interest and that of his charitable foundation [with] about a dozen employees of Quadrangle," it was reported. Moving to the new unit would be Alice Ruth, who had been recruited to Quadrangle for the Bloomberg job and "who [before that] had managed the personal fortune of Gordon Moore, Intel’s co-founder."

== NY State pension fund investigation ==
Mr. Rattner and Quadrangle were linked to a New York pension fund investigation "within months of his [Feb. '09] departure from Quadrangle, and [Rattner then] stepped down from his government role" summer 2009. In September, 2009, a number of other firms involved in the pension fund investigation, including Carlyle Group and Riverstone Holdings, either paid fines or had "already agreed to pay settlements and to stop using placement agents," while Rattner and Quadrangle were "among others in talks with Mr. Cuomo’s office." In April, 2010, the firm agreed to pay fines of $7 million to Mr. Cuomo’s office and $5 million to the Securities and Exchange Commission to settle its part. Rattner was not included in the agreement. According to a report, "The allegations against Quadrangle involved a movie deal that a company owned by one of the firm’s funds agreed to distribute. The film, called Chooch, was a project involving a brother of David J. Loglisci, the chief investment officer of the state pension fund. Mr. Loglisci pleaded guilty [in March 2010] to securities fraud and admitted that he helped steer pension money to political contributors of the former state Comptroller, Alan G. Hevesi, and to companies that paid kickbacks to Mr. Hevesi’s top political consultant, Hank Morris."

== Investment holdings ==
It current investment holdings or portfolio companies include:

- West Corporation (Business Services)
- PMC (Internet)
- Hargray (Triple Play)
- Tower Vision (Wireless)
