= Joshua Steiner =

American businessman

Joshua L. Steiner is a partner at SSW Partners and a senior adviser at Bloomberg LP., where he was previously Head of Industry Verticals. He is the co-author of From Mistakes to Meaning: Owning Your Past So It Doesn’t Own You, a bestselling examination of how mistakes reveal hidden aspects of personalities.

During his tenure at Bloomberg, Steiner oversaw the company's non-financial information businesses, venture capital fund, and corporate development and strategy teams. He also led company-wide initiatives in data privacy, emerging markets growth, and market liberalization.

In 2008, during President Obama's transition into office, Joshua Steiner served as an adviser to the Obama administration regarding economy policy.

Previously he was a Managing Director at Lazard Frères & Co. and former Chief of Staff of the U.S. Treasury Department in the Clinton administration.

== Department of Treasury ==
While Steiner was Chief of Staff of the U.S. Treasury Department in the Clinton Administration, he came into national news as a result of the Whitewater investigations where he testified before Congress on the contacts between the Treasury and the Clinton White House. He testified before the Senate Banking Committee on August 2, 1994 claiming that he had made "misrepresentations" in his own diary. He was quickly branded as "the kid who lied to his own diary" as his testimony was largely seen as an attempt to cover for the Clinton White House.

== Other affiliations ==
He serves on the board of the International Rescue Committee and the Agora Institute at Johns Hopkins University. He is an honorary trustee of the New York Public Library, where he was previously the vice chair of the board. Steiner served on the Board of Trustees at Yale University Art Gallery from 2018 to at least 2023.

== Publications ==
From Mistakes to Meaning: Owning Your Past So It Doesn’t Own You (Avid Reader Press/Simon & Schuster) ISBN 1668080222
