= Emmanuel Rodocanachi =

French historian

Emmanuel Rodocanachi (5 September 1859 - 8 January 1934) was a French homme de lettres and historian, an expert on Rome and ancient Italy.

== Life ==
His grandparents were from Chios, a Greek island. He was elected a member of the Académie des Sciences Morales et Politiques in 1925. He bequeathed to the library of the Institut de France 1,400 works on ancient and modern Italy. He is buried in the Passy Cemetery (2nd division).

== Work ==
His works included Les corporations ouvrières de Rome (1894), Histoire de Rome depuis 1342 (1922-1933), Élisa Napoléon (Baciocchi) en Italie (1900) and Bonaparte et les îles Ioniennes, un épisode des conquêtes de la République et du premier Empire (1797-1816) (1899), Bonaparte and the Ionian Islands. An episode of the conquests of the Republic and the First Empire (1797-1816)] (in French). F. Alcan.

He was a recipient of the French Legion of Honour. He was married, with three children: the Countess of Saporta, the Countess of Lepic, and Pierre Rodocanachi.
