= André Meyer =

French art collector and banker

- Born: September 3, 1898; Paris, France
- Died: September 9, 1979 (aged 81); Lausanne, Switzerland
- Occupation: Investment banker
- Spouse: Bella Lehman (m. 1922–1979) (his death)
- Children: Philippe Meyer; Francine Meyer Schuhl

André Benoît Mathieu Meyer (September 3, 1898 – September 9, 1979) was a French-American investment banker.

== Biography ==
Meyer was born to a low-income Jewish family in Paris. As a boy, he began following the workings of the stock market and out of necessity left school at age sixteen to work as a messenger at the Paris Bourse. Ambitious, he used his time to study the intricacies of stock trading and because of personnel shortages created by so many young French men serving in the military in World War I, he was able to get a job with Baur & Fils, a small Paris bank. By 1925, his performance with the bank got him noticed by Raymond Philippe, who arranged for him to get an offer from the prestigious investment bankers Lazard Frères. Within a few years Meyer was made a partner, succeeding to Raymond Philippe.

At Lazard, André Meyer organized SOVAC (Societé pour la Vente à Crédit d'Automobiles), a finance company that in the late twenties introduced the concept of automobile financing for consumers. It made Lazard Frères a significant force in consumer credit as well as in product leasing. As well, from 1927, representing Lazard along with Paul Frantzen and Raymond Philippe, André Meyer was elected to Board of Directors of the failing automobile giant Citroën. They took charge of company expenditures and substantially reduced operating costs while putting together a financial restructuring plan that saved the company from liquidation. For his service to the economy of France, the government awarded him with the Legion of Honor.

Married with two children, Meyer, who was Jewish, and his family were forced to flee France following the Nazi occupation during World War II. He came to Lazard Frères' New York City office with Chairman Pierre David-Weill (1900–1975) and following the Allied Forces liberation in 1944 David-Weill returned to France and Meyer was appointed head of the American operations, a position he would occupy for the rest of his life.

André Meyer, called "the most creative financial genius of our time in the investment banking world" by David Rockefeller, became one of the most important people in American business with an influence that extended around the globe. Known as "The Picasso of Banking," he introduced innovative financing techniques to post-War American business. During the 1960s, Meyer was responsible for making Lazard Frères the top mergers and acquisitions (M&A) firm in the U.S. He put together prodigious deals through leveraged buyouts for companies such as International Telephone & Telegraph Company (ITT) who grew to become the ninth largest industrial corporation in the United States.

Although he personally was publicity-shy, André Meyer was an advisor to the Kennedy family and a lifelong friend and advisor to Jackie Onassis. He was a friend and advisor to other high-profile public figures such as William S. Paley at CBS and Katharine Graham at The Washington Post. He was also a close confidant of U.S. President Lyndon Johnson, consulting at the Oval Office several times a year during Johnson's tenure.

An avid collector of art objects, Meyer's eclectic assemblages included paintings by Claude Monet, Marc Chagall, and Pablo Picasso, sculptures, Louis XIV furniture, and original music scores. In 1961, he gave artwork to Museum of Modern Art in New York, including a major work by Paul Cézanne. Following his death, the Metropolitan Museum of Art acquired his collection of 19th century European art. His collection of music scores began with works by Georg Muffat and Jean-Philippe Rameau, and expanded to include scores by Georg Frideric Handel, François Couperin, Antonio Vivaldi, Vincent Lübeck, Jean-Baptiste Lully, Christoph Willibald Gluck, a sketchleaf of Ludwig van Beethoven once owned by Frédéric Chopin, Igor Stravinsky, Arnold Schoenberg, Johann Kuhnau, Domenico Scarlatti, Carl Philipp Emanuel Bach, Johann Christian Bach, and Carl Friedrich Abel. When his collection was sold by Sotheby's on 16 and 17 October 2012, they noted that the collection contained beautifully bound 16th and 17th century scores by composers whose manuscripts rarely come up at auction anymore including Orlande de Lassus, Claudio Monteverdi, Jacques Arcadelt, Cristóbal de Morales, Luca Marenzio, Giovanni Pierluigi da Palestrina, Marco da Gagliano, Girolamo Frescobaldi, Jacopo Peri & Ottavio Rinuccini, and Antonio Cesti, among others.

André Meyer maintained a vacation home in Crans-sur-Sierre, Valais, Switzerland and while there in the summer of 1979, he fell ill. He died of circulatory problems in the Nestlé Hospital in Lausanne, and was interred near his closest friend and business partner Pierre David-Weill in the Jewish section of the Cemetery of Montparnasse in the Montparnasse Quarter of Paris, France.

== Legacy ==
Felix Rohatyn credits Meyer as his mentor. Rohatyn asserts that Meyer's guidance and advice made success at Lazard possible.
