= Jacques Brunet (banker) =

French official (1901–1990)

Jacques Brune
- Born: Jacques Élie Pascal Brune; 10 May 1901; Paris, France
- Died: 15 December 1990 (aged 89); Paris, France
- Occupation: Banker
- Known for: Inspection générale des finances

Jacques Élie Pascal Brunet (10 May 1901 — 15 December 1990) was a French top civil servant and banker.

== Biography ==
A law graduate and a graduate of the Free School of Political Science, he entered the Inspection des finances in 1924.

Finance Inspector and State Councilor (in extraordinary service), he was appointed Treasury Director when this position was created in 1940 until in 1946. He became Inspector General of Finance in 1945 and Government Commissioner before the Council of State.

He was managing director of the Banque de l'Algérie from 1946 to 1949, chairman and managing director of the Crédit national from 1949 to 1960, chairman of the Caisse Nationale des Marchés de l'Etat, the Caisse Marocaine des Marchés, the Caisse Nationale de l'Energie, then was appointed Governor of the Banque de France from January 21, 1960, replacing Wilfrid Baumgartner.

Olivier Wormser, succeeded him as head of the Banque de France on 8 April 1969.

He became vice-chairman of the supervisory board of Compagnie Bancaire and Chairman of Compagnie Financière Chimio in 1970, then chairman and chief executive officer of Roussel Uclaf from 1972 to 1977.
