= David David-Weill =

French art collector and banker (1871–1952)

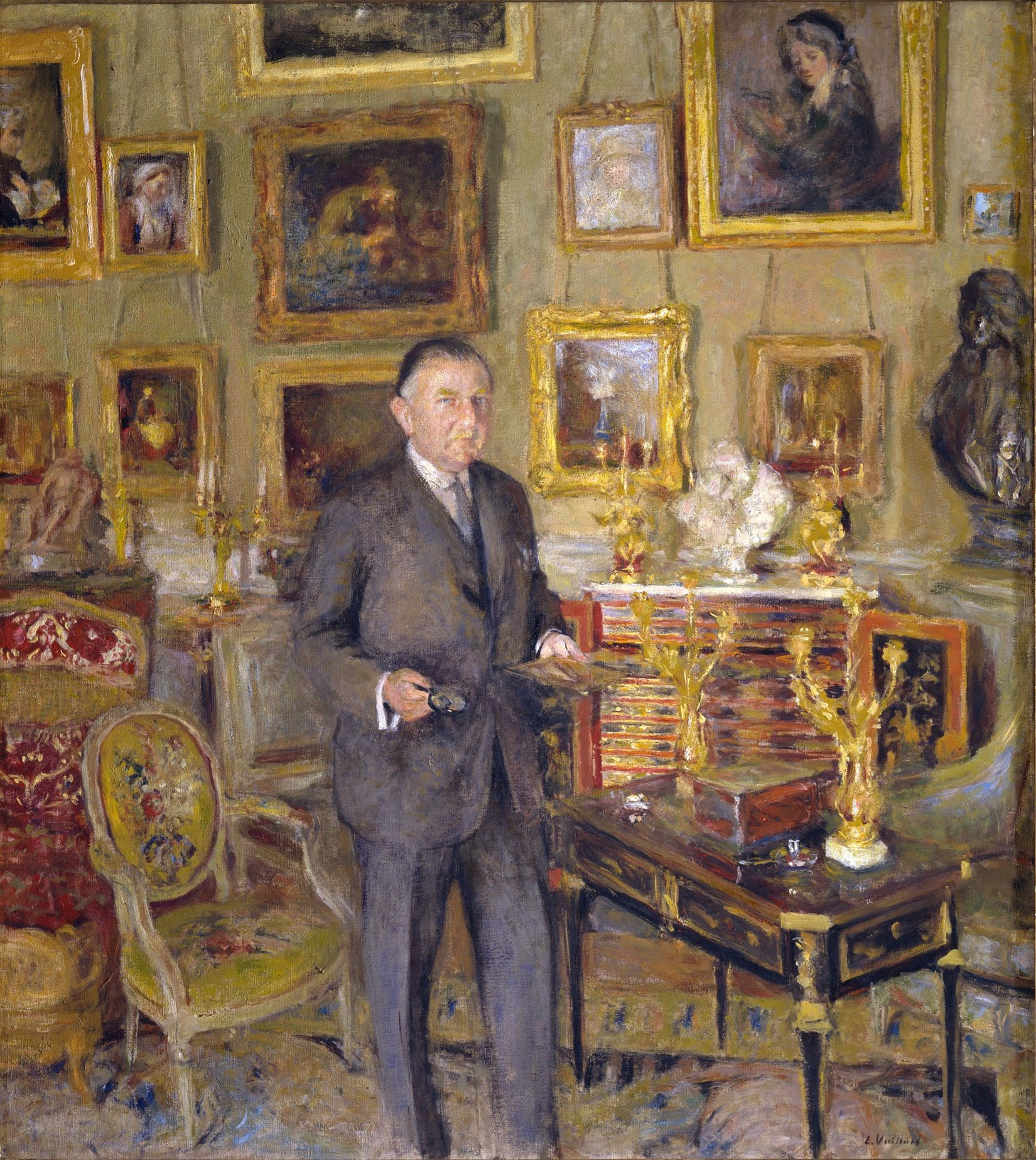
- Édouard Vuillard, David David-Weill, 1925. Oil on canvas. Private Collection.
- Born: August 30, 1871; San Francisco, United States
- Died: July 7, 1952 (aged 80); Neuilly-sur-Seine, Paris
- Occupation: Banker
- Known for: Art collector
- Children: Pierre David-Weill; Jean David-Weill

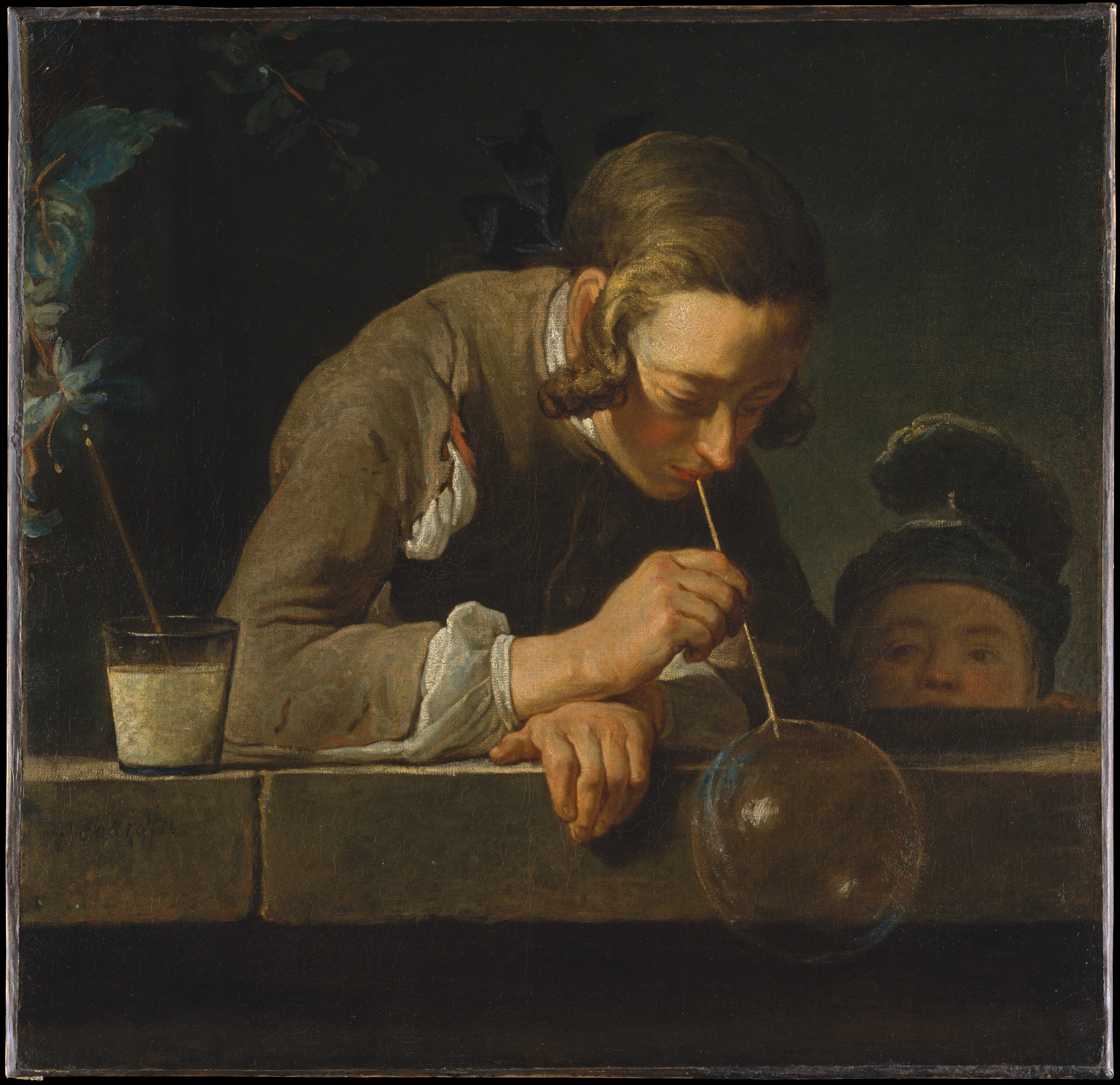
Jean Siméon Chardin, Soap Bubbles. Oil on canvas. Ex David David-Weill Collection. The Metropolitan Museum of Art, New York.

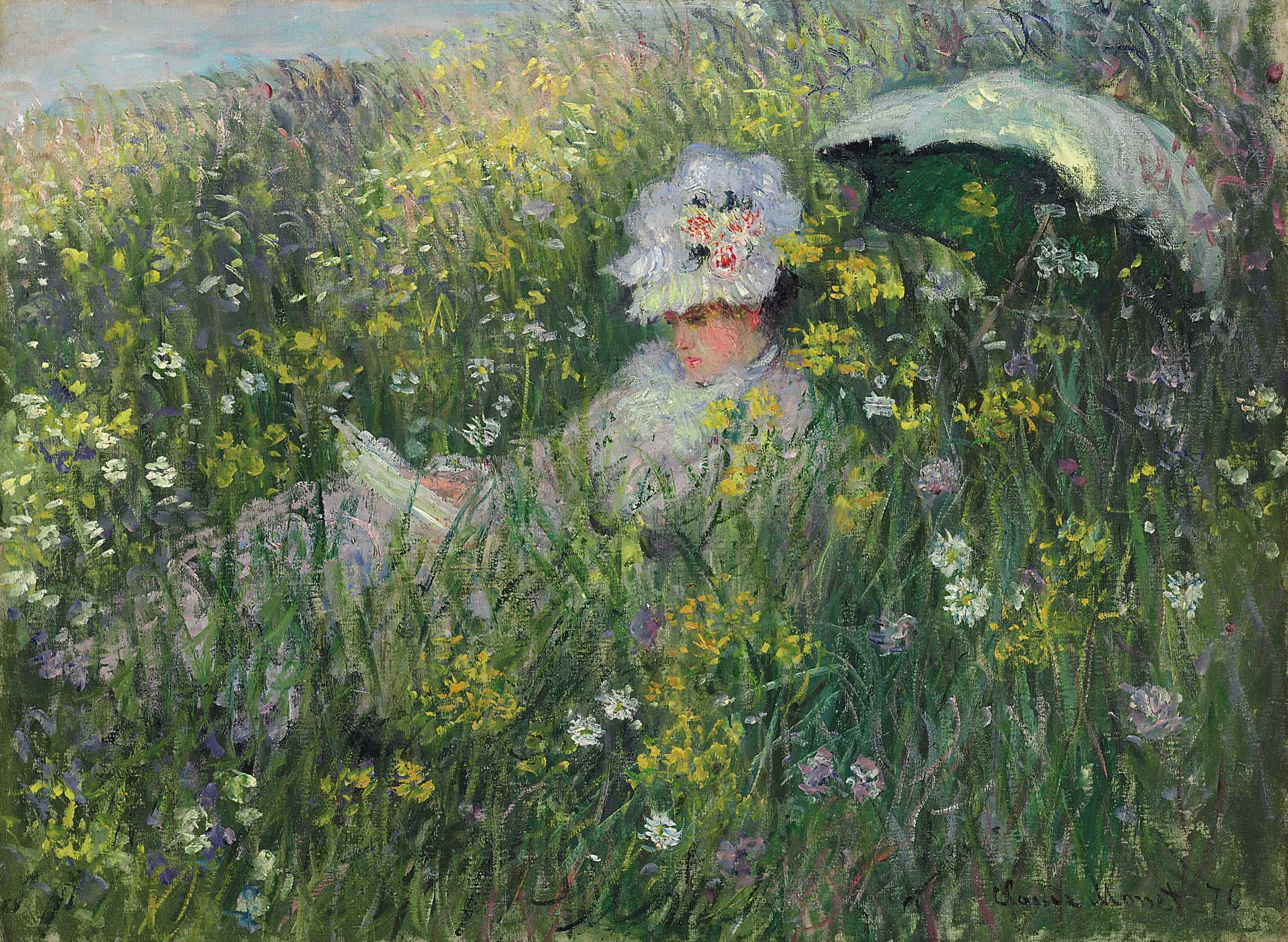
Claude Monet, Dans la Prairie. Ex David David-Weill Collection.

David David-Weill (August 30, 1871 – July 7, 1952) was a French-American banker, chairman of Lazard Frères in Paris, who built an important collection of art. His collection was plundered by the Nazis during the Second World War and over 2000 items seized. He was a major donor to French and American museums and galleries and a benefactor to universities. David-Weill went into hiding at the Roquegauthier Castle in Cancon, France after German's invasion of France in 1940. By 1942, David and Flora David‐Weill relocated to Agen, where they hid in the home of a friend and assumed the surname Warnier. After the War, David and Flora David‐Weill returned to Neuilly, where they restored their home and continued their philanthropic efforts

== Early life and family ==
David-Weill was born in San Francisco on 30 August 1871. He was the son of Julie (née Cahn) and Alexandre Weill (1834–1906). His father was a cousin to the three French Jewish brothers who founded Lazard Frères & Co. His parents had left France in 1870 because of the Franco-Prussian War, and settled in California, where Raphaël Weill, a brother of Alexandre Weill, lived. They returned to France about 1883. David-Weill continued his education there at the Lycée Condorcet and the École Libre des Sciences Politiques. He married Flora Raphaël in 1897 and they had seven children, including Pierre David-Weill and Jean David-Weill.

== Banking career ==
Following his education, David-Weill performed his military service and began to work at Lazard Frères, where he rose to become chairman. He became a regent of the Banque de France in 1935.

== Collecting ==
David-Weill began to collect from an early age. His acquisitions included paintings, drawings, miniatures, sculptures, furniture, silverware, and other items. He became president of the Réunion des Musées Nationaux and vice president of the Société des amis du Louvre.

In 1931, David-Weill transferred part of his collection to a British holding company called Anglo-Continental Art, Inc, which was owned by a Canadian corporation that he controlled.

In late 1940, David-Weill sent twenty-six cases of paintings and antiquities to Lisbon for shipment on the SS Excalibur to New York, where they were to be sold by the Wildensteins, as property of Anglo-Continental Art, Inc. However U.S. Treasury officials, concerned about their French origins in wartime, "descended on the elegant premises of Wildenstein, New York". The assets of Anglo-Continental were frozen by US officials and proceeds placed in a blocked account.

In France, David-Weill's collection was looted by the Nazis during the Second World War and, according to German records, 2687 items seized.

Many of looted paintings, such as Henri Fantin-Latour's Self-Portrait, were recovered by the Monuments Men and returned to France which restituted them to David-Weill. Not all artworks were recovered. Missing paintings were published in the Répertoire des biens spoliés en France durant la guerre 1939-1945, Groupe français du conseil de controle, 1947.

In later life he donated more than 2000 items to museums and galleries, including the Guimet Museum, the Louvre, and universities in New York, Hamburg, Leiden, Honolulu, and Stockholm. He donated to the libraries of the Musée de l'Homme and the Institut national d'histoire de l'art, to which he gave the manuscript and journal of Eugène Delacroix. He also gave his Chinese-bronze collection to the Musée Guimet and his cloisonné objects to the Musée des Arts Décoratifs (MAD).

== Death ==
David-Weill died in Neuilly-sur-Seine, Paris, on 7 July 1952. Parts of his collection were sold in a series of auctions in 1970.

== Honors ==
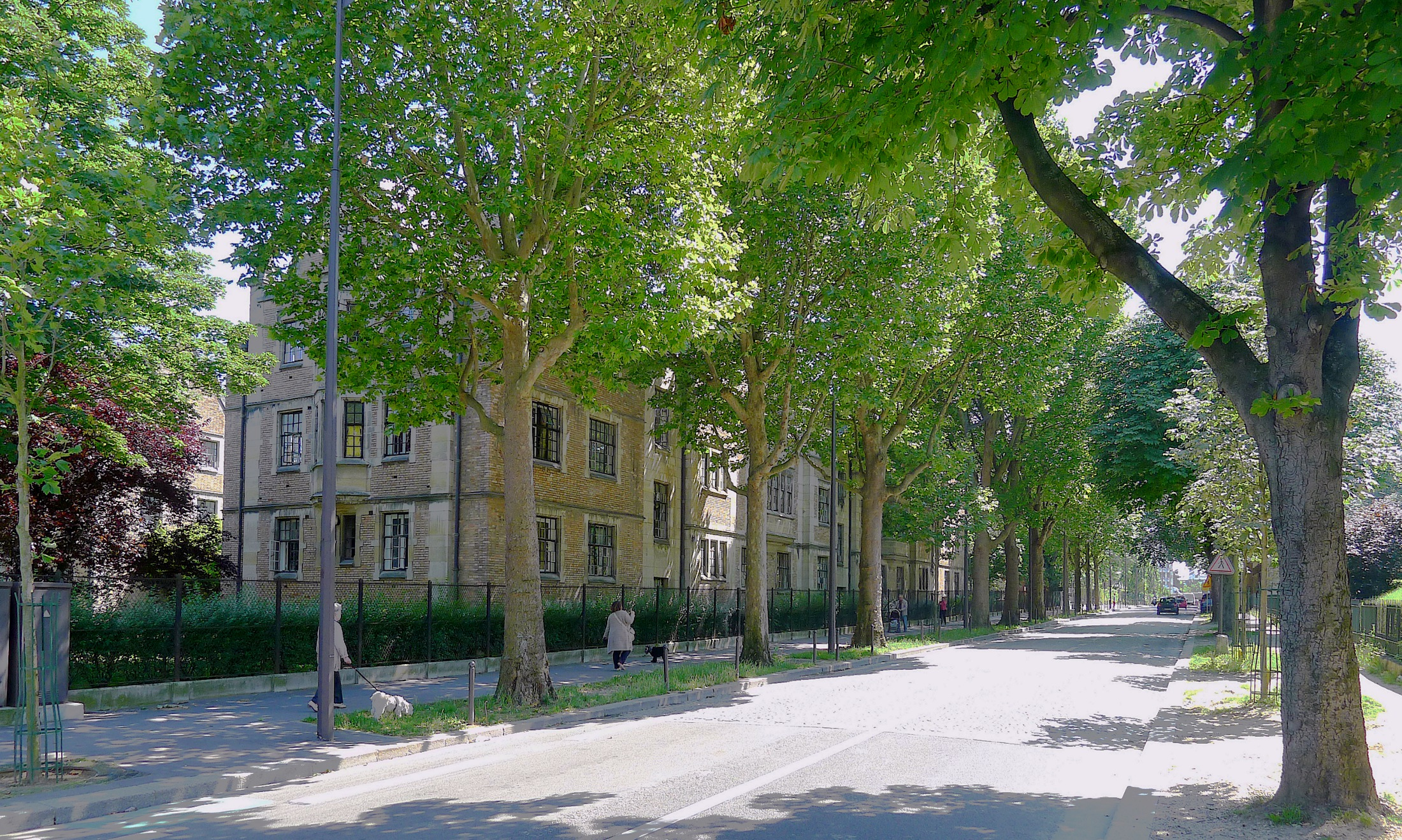
Avenue David-Weill, Paris.

- David-Weill was elected to the Académie des beaux-arts in 1934.
- Avenue David-Weill in the 14th arrondissement of Paris was named in his honor in 1960 in tribute to his involvement with the Cité internationale universitaire de Paris.

== See also ==
- Michel David-Weill
