= Kenneth M. Jacobs =

American businessman

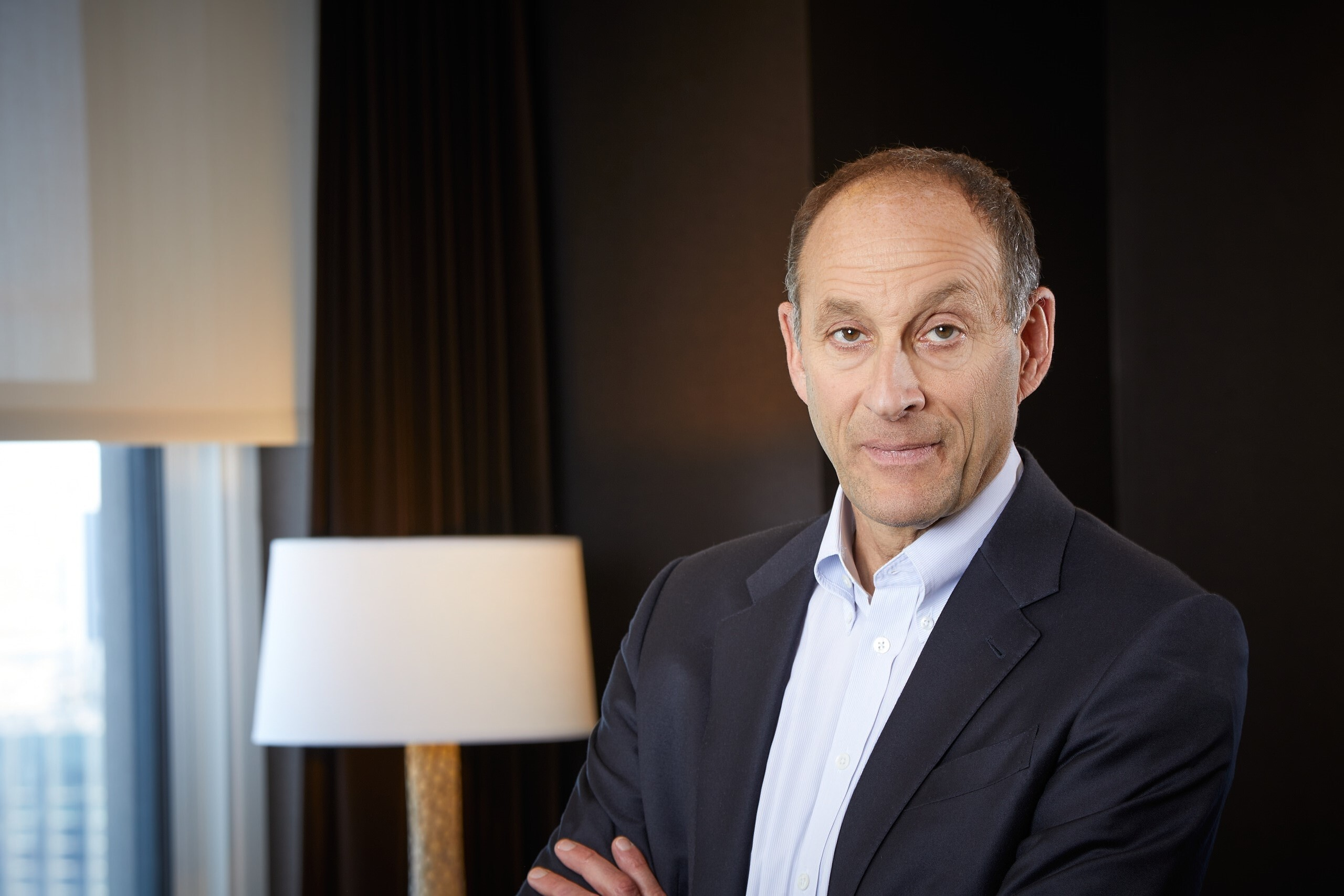
- Kenneth Jacobs in 2023
- Born: September 1958 (age 67); Greenburgh, New York, US
- Education: University of Chicago (BA); Stanford University (MBA)
- Occupation: Senior advisor to Lazard
- Spouse: Agnès Mentre
- Children: 3

Kenneth M. Jacobs (born September 1958) is an American business executive. He serves as Senior Advisor to the Board of Lazard. Previously, he was the CEO and chairman of Lazard from 2009 until September 2023, when he became executive chairman.

== Biography ==
Born in Greenburgh, New York, in September 1958, Jacobs received a B.A. in economics from the University of Chicago and an M.B.A. from the Stanford University Graduate School of Business. He joined the financial company Lazard in 1988, and was named a partner in 1991. In 2002 he was named deputy chairman and head of North America for Lazard. In this role, he focused on new markets and new practices, for example expanding Lazard’s financial advisory business via acquisitions.

In November 2009, the Lazard board elected Jacobs as chairman and chief executive officer. Lazard announced on May 26, 2023 that Jacobs would transition from CEO and chairman to executive chairman effective October 1, 2023, while continuing to advise clients on financial matters. In November 2024, Lazard announced that Jacobs would further transition to Senior Chairman of the company and Senior Advisor to the Board. As of July 2026, Jacobs no longer holds the title of Senior Chairman and continues to serve as a Senior Advisor to the firm.

In February 2026, Jacobs was appointed to the board of trustees of Vanguard Group. In July 2026, Jacobs was elected non-executive chairman of Vanguard Group's board of directors, effective January 1, 2027. He is vice-chair of the both Board of Trustees at the University of Chicago and the board at the Brookings Institution.

== Personal life ==
Jacobs is married to Agnès Mentre, daughter of French banker and politician, Paul Mentré; she was a former Lazard banker who later became a film producer including such credits as The Wrestler, the Michael Moore documentary Fahrenheit 9/11, and Wind River. They have two daughters and a son.
