= Pierre David-Weill =

French investment banker (1900–1975)

- Born: Pierre Sylvain Désiré Gérard David-Weill; March 8, 1900; Paris, France
- Died: January 14, 1975 (age 74)
- Occupation: Banker
- Spouse: Berthe Haardt
- Children: Michel David-Weill; Eliane David-Weill
- Parent(s): Flora Raphaël Weil; David David-Weill

Pierre David-Weill (8 March 1900 – 14 January 1975) was a French investment banker.

== Early life ==
Pierre Sylvain Désiré Gérard David-Weill was born on 8 March 1900 in Paris, France, into a Jewish family. His father, David David-Weill (1871-1952), was the chairman of Lazard Frères; his mother was Flora Raphaël.

== Career ==
David-Weill became a partner in the Paris office of the family's bank in 1927, when its chairman was Raymond Philippe.

Along with Lazard Frères minority partner, André Meyer, Pierre David-Weill and his family fled the German occupation of France during World War II to the safety of the United States. There, he took charge of the firm's office in New York City, where he remained until the liberation of France by Allied Forces in 1944. On his return to Paris, he left André Meyer in charge of American operations, and along with Felix Rohatyn, they expanded the Lazard Frères business to make it a leading Euro-American investment bank.

== Personal life ==
David-Weill married Berthe Haardt in 1932. They had a son, Michel David-Weill (born 1932), and a daughter, Eliane David-Weill (born 1935).

== Death ==
Pierre David-Weill died in 1975. Despite converting to Catholicism in 1965, he is interred with his wife in the Jewish section of the Cimetière du Montparnasse in the Montparnasse Quarter of Paris.
