= Felix Rohatyn =

American investment banker and diplomat (1928–2019)

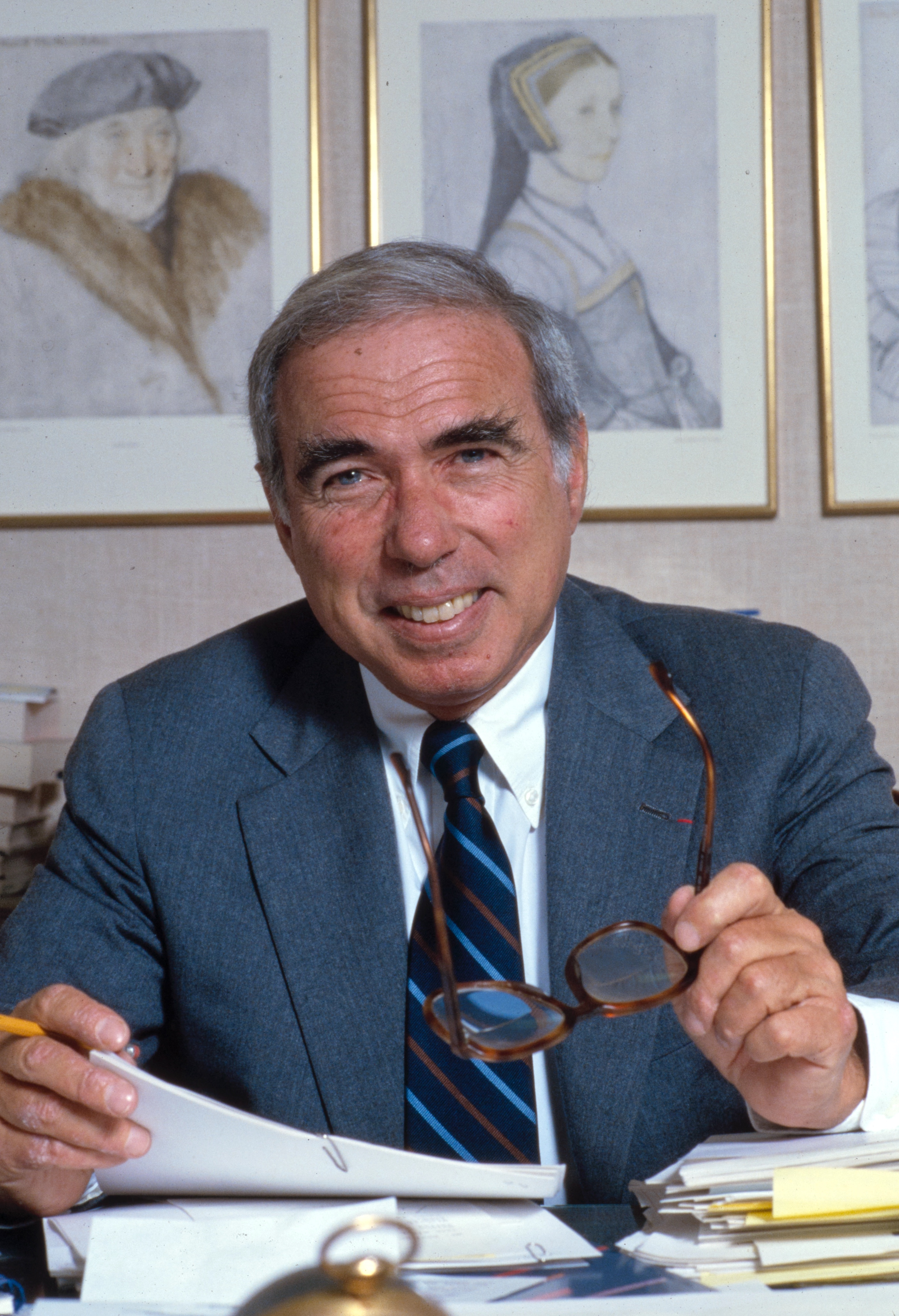
- Rohatyn in 1985

United States Ambassador to France
- In office September 11, 1997 – December 7, 2000
- President: Bill Clinton
- Preceded by: Pamela Harriman
- Succeeded by: Howard H. Leach

Personal details
- Born: Felix George Rohatyn; May 29, 1928 Vienna, Austria
- Died: December 14, 2019 (aged 91) New York City, New York, U.S.
- Party: Democratic
- Spouses: Jeannette Streit (m. 1956; div. 1979); Elizabeth Fly Vagliano (m. 1979; died 2016)
- Children: 3
- Relatives: Clarence Streit (former father-in-law); Jeanne Greenberg Rohatyn (daughter-in-law); Nina Griscom (stepdaughter)
- Education: Middlebury College (BS)

Felix George Rohatyn (/ˈroʊɑːtɪn/ ROH-ah-tin; May 29, 1928 – December 14, 2019) was an American investment banker and diplomat. He spent most of his career with Lazard, where he brokered numerous large corporate mergers and acquisitions from the 1960s through the 1990s. In 1975, he played a central role in preventing the bankruptcy of New York City as chairman of the Municipal Assistance Corporation and chief negotiator between the city, its labor unions and its creditors.

Rohatyn later became an outspoken advocate for rebuilding America's infrastructure, working with politicians and business leaders to craft guiding principles for strengthening infrastructure as co-chair of the Commission on Public Infrastructure. Rohatyn was involved in efforts to form a national infrastructure bank, and assisted in the rebuilding of New York City following Hurricane Sandy as co-chair of the New York State 2100 Commission.

From 1997 to 2000, Rohatyn served as United States Ambassador to France.

== Early life ==
The name Rohatyn has been claimed to be of Tatar origins. Rohatyn was born in Vienna in 1928, the only son of Alexander Rohatyn, a Polish Jew, and Edith (Knoll) Rohatyn, a native of Austria, who divorced his father. His great-grandfather, Feivel Rohatyn, was Chief Rabbi of Zlotshov, 50 km from Ukrainian town Rohatyn. Rohatyn in Ukrainian (Slavic) translates "Horn Stacket" in English, then Zolochiv was in Austrian Galicia, now in Ukraine. His father managed breweries controlled by the family in Vienna, Romania, and Yugoslavia. The family left Austria in 1935 for France. First living in Orléans, where his father was a brewery manager, and then in Paris in 1937 following his parents' divorce, he attended the Lycée Janson-de-Sailly, where he was awarded a prize for excellence in 1938. After the German invasion of France in 1940, they fled to Casablanca, Lisbon, and in 1941, Rio de Janeiro, before arriving in the United States in 1942. Luis Martins de Souza Dantas, the Brazilian ambassador to France, provided visas that enabled them to escape France and the Holocaust by sailing from Marseille to Casablanca.

Rohatyn was educated at schools in France. On his arrival in the US in 1942 he joined McBurney School and later attended Middlebury College, where he graduated B.S. in the class of 1949, majoring in physics.

== Career ==
From Middlebury, Rohatyn joined the New York office of the investment bank Lazard Frères under André Meyer. In 1950, he was drafted into the United States Army for two years and ended his military service during the Korean War as a sergeant. He returned to Lazard in 1952 and was made a partner in the firm in 1961, going on to become managing director. While at Lazard he brokered numerous major mergers and acquisitions, notably on behalf of International Telephone and Telegraph (ITT), where he became a director in 1966. He also served on the boards of the Engelhard Corporation, Howmet Turbine Component Corporation, Owens-Illinois, Pfizer, and the New York Stock Exchange from 1968 to 1972.

=== New York City fiscal crisis ===
When the City of New York ran out of money in mid-April 1975, Governor of New York Hugh Carey advanced state funds to the city to allow it to pay its bills, on the condition that the city turn over the management of its finances to the State of New York. Carey appointed Rohatyn to head a blue-ribbon advisory committee to look for a long-term solution to the city's fiscal problems. The advisory committee recommended the creation of the Municipal Assistance Corporation (MAC), an independent corporation which was authorized to sell bonds to meet the borrowing needs of the city. While the deficit increased to $750 million, the MAC was established on June 10, 1975, with Rohatyn as chairman, and a board of nine prominent citizens.

The MAC, led by Rohatyn, insisted that the city make major reforms, including a wage freeze, a major layoff, a subway fare hike, and charging tuition at the City University of New York. A state law converted the city sales tax and stock transfer tax into state taxes, which when collected were then used as security for the MAC bonds. Because the MAC did not create enough profit fast enough, the city created an Emergency Financial Control Board to monitor the city's finances. But even with all of these measures, the value of the MAC bonds dropped in price, and the city struggled to find the money to pay its employees and stay in operation. In November 1975 the federal government stepped in, with Congress extending $2.3 billion in short-term loans in return for more stringent measures. Rohatyn and the MAC directors persuaded the banks to defer the maturity of the bonds they held and to accept less interest, and convinced banks to buy MAC bonds to pay off the city's debts. The confidence in MAC bonds was restored, and under Rohatyn's chairmanship, the MAC successfully sold $10 billion in bonds. By 1977–1978, New York City had eliminated its short-term debt. By 1985, the city no longer needed the support of the Municipal Assistance Corporation, and it voted itself out of existence.

Rohatyn, as the chairman of the MAC and the chief negotiator between the city, the unions, and the banks, was widely given credit for the success of MAC and the rescue of New York City from bankruptcy, despite the large social costs. He also drew the fire of some critics, who accused him of bailing out the banks, while slashing workers' wages and benefits and reducing the power of municipal unions. As Rohatyn wrote in the MAC annual report, however, "The alternative to such cutbacks would have been bankruptcy for the city, which would have generated infinitely greater social costs". In a letter to The New York Times on March 4, 2012, Rohatyn attributed New York City's fiscal turnaround from possible bankruptcy in the late 1970s to the leadership of former New York Governor Hugh Carey and to the cooperative efforts of the city's banks and unions, though not to President Gerald Ford's belated agreement to federally guarantee the newly issued city bonds.

=== After the New York City fiscal crisis ===
By the time Bill Clinton was elected, Rohatyn had aspired to be United States Secretary of the Treasury since the 1970s. He had supported longtime client Ross Perot's candidacy, however, and Clinton appointed Lloyd Bentsen instead. In 1996, the Clinton administration put forward his candidacy for the post of Vice Chairman of the Federal Reserve, but a formal nomination was not made because of ideological opposition from Republicans.

According to The New York Times, in the 1990s, Rohatyn described derivatives as "financial hydrogen bombs, built on personal computers by 26-year-olds with M.B.A.s". In 2006 Rohatyn joined Lehman Brothers as a senior advisor to chairman Dick Fuld. On January 27, 2010, Rohatyn announced his return to Lazard as special advisor to the chairman and chief executive officer, after a short role at Rothschild.

=== Ambassador to France ===
Rohatyn was United States Ambassador to France from 1997 to 2000, during the second term of the Clinton Administration and was a Commander in the French Legion of Honour. He was a member of the Council on Foreign Relations, American Academy of Arts and Sciences, and a trustee for the Center for Strategic and International Studies. He also delivered a speech to D-Day veterans at Omaha Beach in 1999, on the 55th anniversary of the Liberation of Normandy. He told them that a "democratic, prosperous Europe is the finest monument" to the veterans' exploits. He said, "I ask the children here today to look around — you are in the company of real heroes".

As ambassador, he also organized the French-American Business Council, a 40-member council of U.S. and French corporate chief executives which met annually, with meetings held alternately in the United States and France. The council meetings included President Clinton, President Chirac and Prime Minister Jospin, as well as U.S. cabinet secretaries and French government ministers and meetings continued during the presidencies of George W. Bush and Nicolas Sarkozy. While ambassador, Rohatyn also worked with the United States Conference of Mayors to establish the TransAtlantic Conference of Mayors that gathered U.S. and European mayors to discuss urban and economic issues and build ties among their cities. In addition, Mrs. Elizabeth Rohatyn founded the French Regional and American Museum Exchange (FRAME), a consortium of 26 French and North American art museums that works together to sponsor major, bilateral exhibitions and education programs. After the Rohatyns left the ambassador's post in Paris, FRAME became an independent, non-profit organization, which Mrs. Rohatyn continued to co-chair. FRAME remains vibrant and active in 2020.

== Infrastructure ==
The New York Times columnist, William Safire, once wrote about "the infrastructuralist Felix Rohatyn", due to Rohatyn's long-time advocacy of rebuilding America's public infrastructure to strengthen the country's economy and global competitiveness. In 2007, Rohatyn and the late Senator Warren Rudman co-chaired the Commission on Public Infrastructure, a bipartisan council of governors, members of the United States Congress and U.S. business leaders sponsored by the Center for Strategic and International Studies (CSIS). It drew up guiding principles for strengthening U.S. infrastructure. Its members included then U.S. Senators Christopher Dodd and Chuck Hagel; based on the commission's work and findings, Dodd and Hagel introduced Senate legislation to create a National Infrastructure Reinvestment Bank. When they left the Senate, sponsorship of the Bill was assumed by then Senators John Kerry and Kay Bailey Hutchison. Rohatyn also worked with Congresswoman Rosa DeLauro, who has authored a House bill to create an infrastructure bank. Rohatyn testified in both the House and Senate in support of the law.

His book, Bold Endeavors: How our Government Built America, and Why It Must Rebuild Now, argues that a national infrastructure investment program would have a transformational effect and lift the U.S. economy, as did historic federal projects such as the First transcontinental railroad, the G.I. Bill, Land Grant Colleges and the Interstate Highway System. After Superstorm Sandy, New York Governor Andrew Cuomo appointed Rohatyn co-chair of the New York State 2100 Commission, which developed strategies for rebuilding after the hurricane. Rohatyn also served as co-chair of the New York Works Task Force on Infrastructure.

== Personal life ==
Rohatyn was married twice. In 1956, he married Jeanette Streit (1924–2012), the daughter of journalist and Atlanticist, Clarence Streit and Jeanne DeFrance Streit. They divorced in 1979. They had three children, Pierre Rohatyn, Nicolas Rohatyn, and Michael Rohatyn.

In 1979, he married Elizabeth Fly Vagliano. Elizabeth died on October 10, 2016, at the age of 86. Rohatyn died on December 14, 2019, in Manhattan. He was 91.

His son Nicolas is married to the art gallerist Jeanne Greenberg Rohatyn. His stepdaughter was the model Nina Griscom, who died on January 25, 2020.

== Selected bibliography ==
- 1983: The Twenty-year Century: Essays on Economics and Public Finance. New York: Random House. ISBN 978-0-394-53450-3.
- 2002: "Capitalism Betrayed". The New York Review of Books. February 28, 2002.
- 2002: "From New York to Baghdad". The New York Review of Books. November 21, 2002.
- 2003: With Béchat, Jean-Paul. The Future of the Transatlantic Defense Community: Final Report of the CSIS Commission on Transatlantic Security and Industrial Cooperation in the Twenty-first Century. Washington, D.C.: CSIS Press. ISBN 978-0-89206-425-0.
- 2003: "Free, Wealthy and Fair". The Wall Street Journal. November 11, 2003.
- 2005: "Where Now for the U.S. Economy? Domestic Public Investment and America's Position in the World". Center for American Progress. Washington. September 22, 2005.
- 2005: With Warren Rudman. "It's Time to Rebuild America". The Washington Post. December 13, 2005.
- 2006: "When the Free Market and Politics Collide". The International Herald Tribune. April 3, 2006.
- 2007: With George L. Argyros and Marc Grossman. The Embassy of the Future. Washington, D.C.: The CSIS Press. ISBN 978-0-89206-508-0.
- 2007: With Warren Rudman. "Guiding Principles for Strengthening America's Future". Commission on Public Infrastructure, Center for Strategic and International Studies.
- 2007: "A Small Price to Get New York Moving Again". The Financial Times. April 26, 2007.
- 2008: With Ehrlich, Everett. "A New Bank to Save Our Infastracture".The New York Review of Books. October 9, 2008.
- 2009: Bold Endeavors: How Our Government Built America, and Why It Must Rebuild Now. New York: Simon & Schuster. ISBN 978-1-4165-3312-2.
- 2009: "Rebuilding the Economy by Rebuilding America". Economic Club of Chicago. March 24, 2009.
- 2010: Dealings: A Political and Financial Life New York: Simon & Schuster. ISBN 978-1-4391-8196-6.

Diplomatic posts
Preceded by Pamela Harriman	United States Ambassador to France; 1997–2000	Succeeded by Howard H. Leach
