= Lazard =

American investment bank

Lazard Inc.

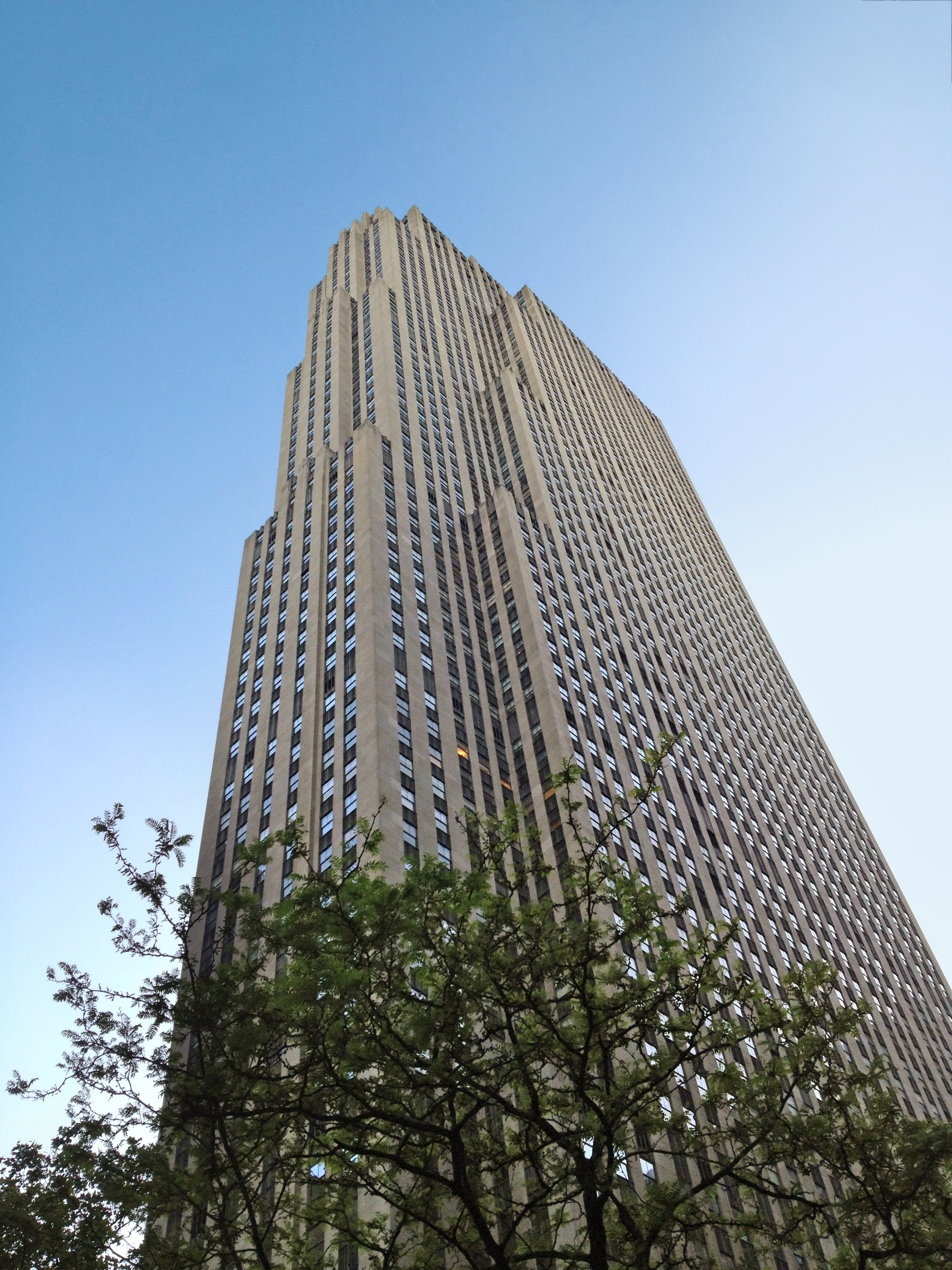
- Headquarters at 30 Rockefeller Plaza
- Formerly: Lazard Ltd; Lazard Frères & Co.
- Type: Public
- Traded as: NYSE: LAZ (Class A); Russell 1000 component; S&P 600 component
- Industry: Financial services
- Founded: July 12, 1848; 178 years ago New Orleans, Louisiana, U.S.
- Founders: Alexandre Lazard; Lazare Lazard; Simon Lazard
- Headquarters: 30 Rockefeller Plaza, New York City, U.S.
- Key people: Peter R. Orszag (CEO and Chairman); Christopher Hogbin (CEO, Lazard Asset Management); Dan Schulman (Lead Independent Director); Raymond J. McGuire (President)
- Products: Financial services; Investment banking; Investment management
- Revenue: ▲US$3.10 billion (2025)
- Operating income: ▼US$328 million (2025)
- Net income: ▼US$237 million (2025)
- AUM: ▲US$254 billion (2025)
- Total assets: ▲US$4.94 billion (2025)
- Total equity: ▲US$874 million (2025)
- Number of employees: 3,309 (2025)
- Website: lazard.com

Lazard Inc. (formerly known as Lazard Ltd and Lazard Frères & Co.) is a multinational financial advisory and asset management firm that is headquartered in the United States. The firm engages in investment banking, asset management and other financial services, primarily with institutional clients. It is the world's largest independent investment bank, with principal executive offices in New York City, Paris and London.

Lazard was founded in 1848 and operates from 41 cities across 26 countries in North America, Europe, Asia, Australia, and Central and South America. The firm provides advice on mergers and acquisitions, strategic matters, restructuring and capital structure, capital raising and corporate finance, as well as asset management services to corporations, partnerships, institutions, governments and individuals.

== History ==
=== Early years ===
On July 12, 1848, three French brothers, Alexandre Lazard, Lazare Lazard, and Simon Lazard, founded Lazard Frères & Co. as a dry goods merchant store in New Orleans, Louisiana. By 1851, Simon and two more brothers, Maurice and Elie, had all moved to San Francisco, California, while Alexandre moved to New York. With the Gold Rush in full swing, the brothers traded in gold between San Francisco and Western Europe.

In 1854, Alexandre Lazard moved to Paris, France, where he opened an office to complement the U.S. business. The firm began advising the French government on gold buying. In 1870, the firm continued to expand its international operations, opening an office in London as well.

The name "Lazard Frères" means "Lazard Brothers" or "the Brothers Lazard" in French. It refers to associations of the Lazard brothers to form various financial services institutions with world-wide offices and investments.

=== The Three Houses of Lazard ===
In the late 1800s and early 1900s, the firm evolved into three "Houses of Lazard" in the United States, France, and the United Kingdom, separately managed but allied. The Lazard partners advised clients on financial matters and built a cross-border network of high-level relationships in business and government. Noted financial advisor George Blumenthal rose to prominence as the head of the U.S. branch of Lazard Frères and was a partner of Lazard Frères in France.

In the economic boom following World War II, the American operations of Lazard expanded significantly under the leadership of the French financier André Meyer. Meyer and Lazard partner Felix Rohatyn have been credited with virtually inventing the modern mergers and acquisitions (M&A) market.

In 1953, Lazard Investors Ltd began an asset management business in London, which is the origin of today's Lazard Asset Management.

=== A unified firm ===
In 1977, as the health of Meyer began to deteriorate, the firm came to be controlled by Michel David-Weill. Under his leadership, the three houses of Lazard were formally united in 2000 as Lazard LLC.

In 2002, David-Weill hired Bruce Wasserstein to be CEO. Lazard became a public company in 2005, with nearly two-thirds of its shares owned by current and former employees. Wasserstein became its first chairman and CEO. In connection with the initial public offering (IPO), Lazard spun off its broker-dealer business, Lazard Capital Markets.

Following Wasserstein's death in 2009, Lazard's board of directors elected Kenneth M. Jacobs as chairman and CEO.

During the Greek sovereign debt crisis, Lazard served as advisor to the Greek government, securing "the biggest restructuring deal in history" in 2012. They were hired again by the incoming Syriza party in 2015. The crisis was finally resolved in 2018.

Lazard invested in a startup investment bank, Independence Point Advisors, in late 2021.

On May 26, 2023, the firm announced that Peter R. Orszag, CEO of Financial Advisory, had been unanimously elected by its Board to serve as CEO of Lazard and as a Board Director, effective October 1, 2023. Orszag became chief executive officer of Lazard on October 1, 2023. On January 1, 2025, Orszag's role expanded to serve as CEO and Chairman of Lazard's Board of Directors.

The publicly traded partnership Lazard Ltd was reincorporated under the Delaware General Corporation Law effective January 1, 2024 and changed its name from Lazard Ltd to Lazard, Inc.

In 2025, Lazard partnered with alternative credit firm Arini Capital Management to collaborate on sourcing and direct lending opportunities across Europe, the Middle East, and Africa.

In April 2026, Lazard announced it would acquire advisory firm Campbell Lutyens for $575 million, creating Lazard CL, a private capital advisory platform that will become the firm’s third global business.

== Business overview ==
=== Financial advisory ===
Lazard advises clients on a wide range of strategic and financial issues. The firm has advised on many of the largest restructuring assignments during and after the 2008 financial crisis. Lazard's Sovereign Advisory group advises governments and sovereign entities on policy and financial issues.

=== Asset management ===
Lazard's asset management business provides investment management and financial advisory services. The firm manages assets on behalf of institutional clients (corporations, labor unions, public pension funds, endowments, foundations, insurance companies, and banks; and through sub-advisory relationships, mutual fund sponsors, broker-dealers and registered advisors) and individual clients (principally family offices and high-net-worth individuals).

In December 2025, Christopher Hogbin was appointed CEO of Lazard Asset Management.

== Office locations ==
The bank operates from 39 cities across 22 countries.

- (Netherlands) Amsterdam
- (United States) Austin
- (China) Beijing
- (Belgium) Brussels
- (France) Bordeaux
- (United States) Boston
- (United States) Charlotte
- (United States) Chicago
- (United Arab Emirates) Dubai
- (Republic of Ireland) Dublin
- (Germany) Frankfurt
- (Switzerland) Geneva
- (Germany) Hamburg
- Hong Kong
- (United States) Houston
- (United Kingdom) London
- (United States) Los Angeles
- Luxembourg
- (France) Lyon
- (Spain) Madrid
- (Australia) Melbourne
- (Italy) Milan
- (United States) Minneapolis
- (Canada) Montreal
- (Germany) Munich
- (France) Nantes
- (United States) New York City
- (France) Paris
- (Saudi Arabia) Riyadh
- (United States) San Francisco
- (Brazil) São Paulo
- (South Korea) Seoul
- Singapore
- (Sweden) Stockholm
- (Australia) Sydney
- (Japan) Tokyo
- (Canada) Toronto
- (Austria) Vienna
- (Switzerland) Zürich

In Paris, the Lazard offices were located successively at 17, boulevard Poissonnière (1885–1907); 5–7, rue Pillet-Will (1907–1979); 141, boulevard Haussmann (1979–2020); and 175, boulevard Haussmann (since September 2020).

Lazard's New York City headquarters spans the top floors of 30 Rockefeller Plaza, including what used to be Room 5600, the former offices of the Rockefeller family dynasty.

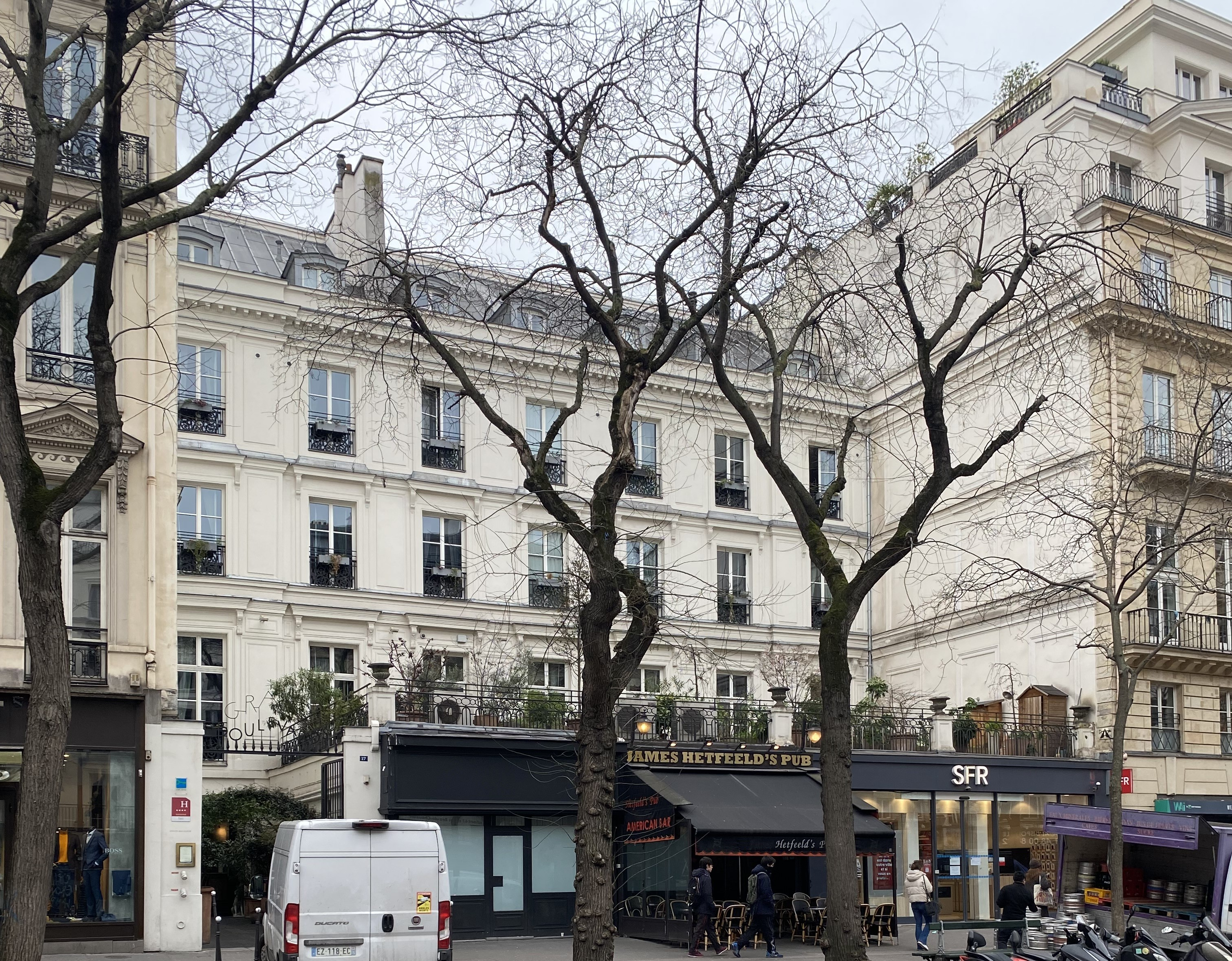
17, boulevard Poissonnière, Paris

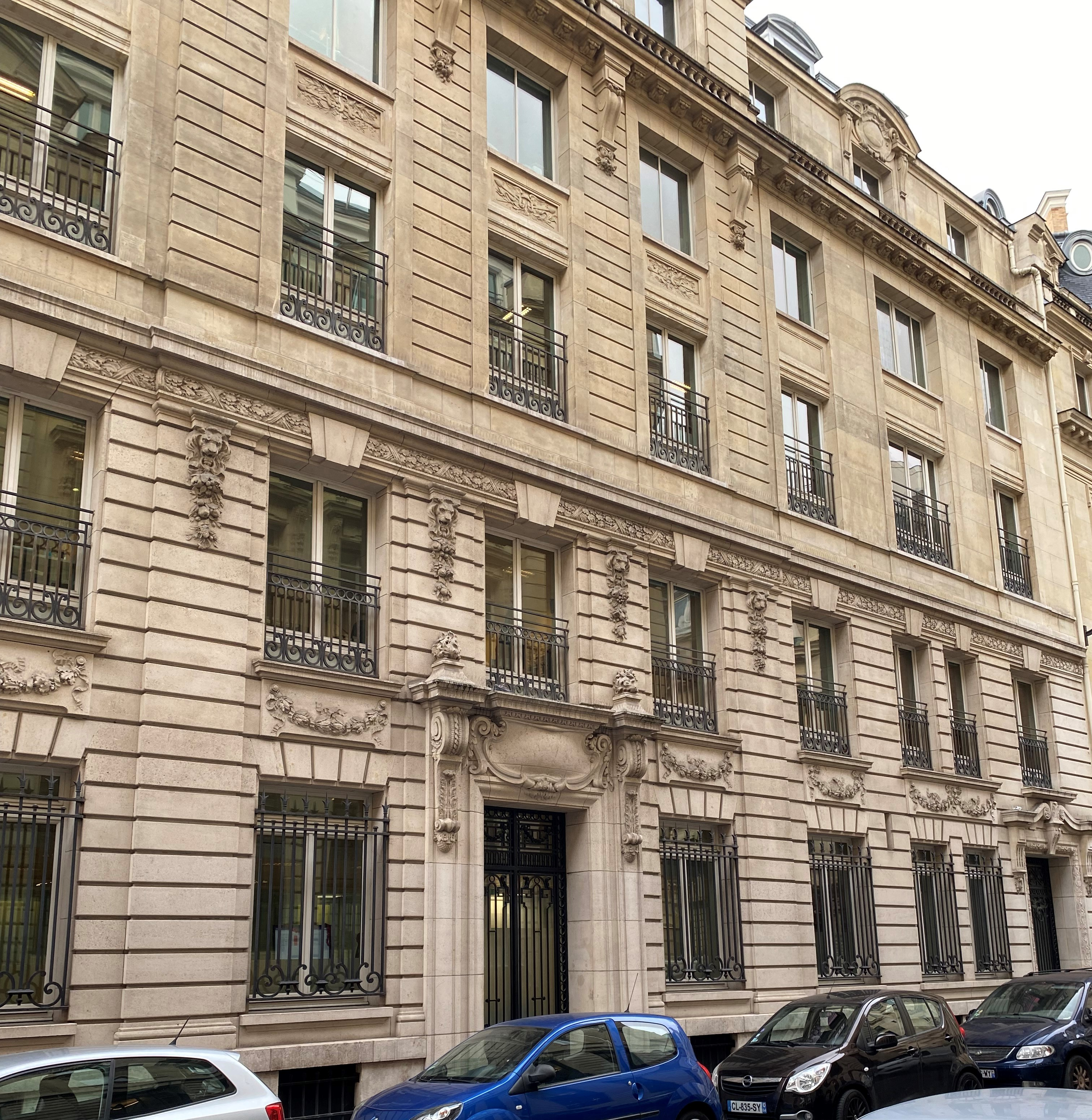
5-7, rue Pillet-Will, Paris

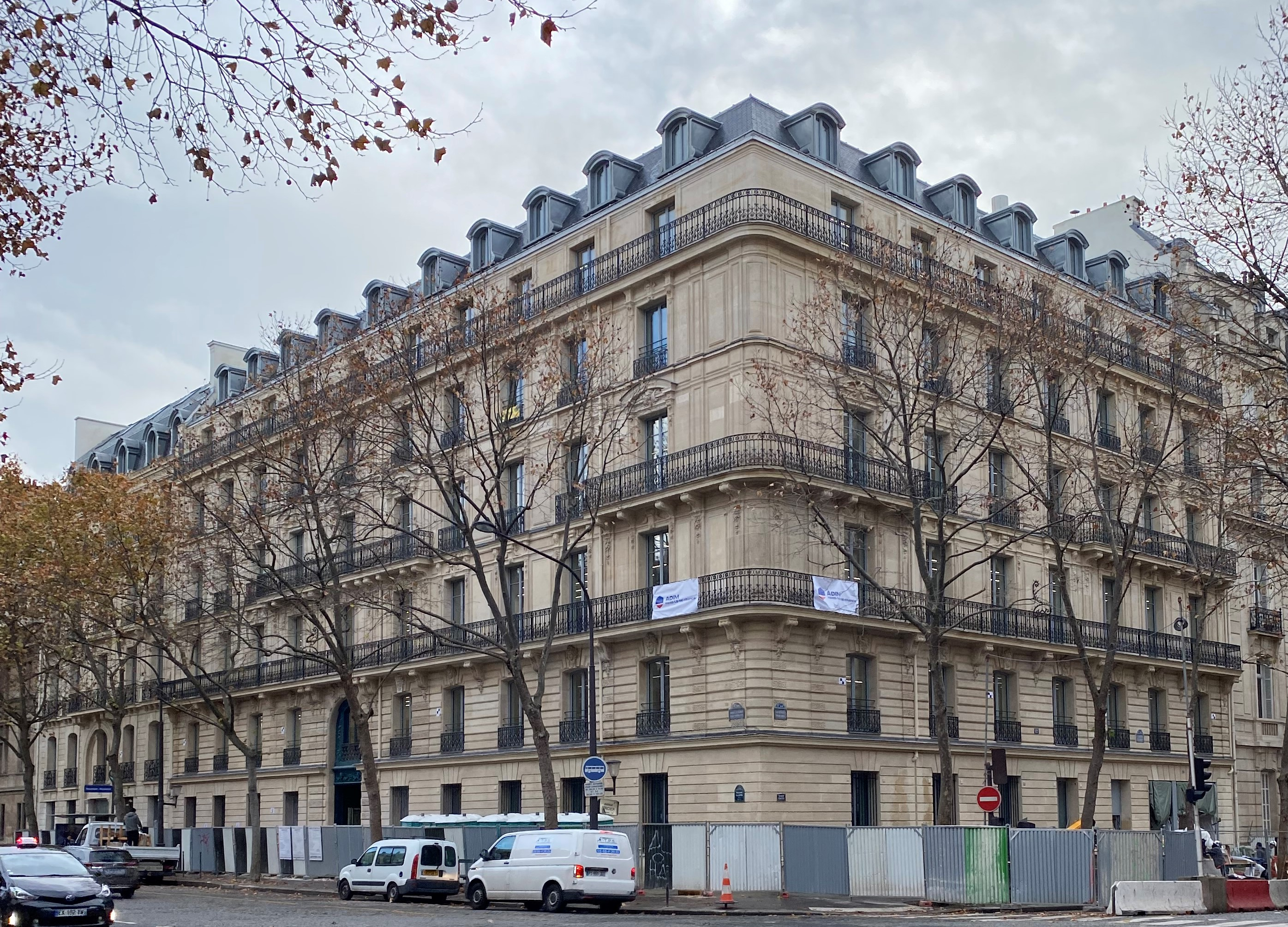
121, boulevard Haussmann, Paris

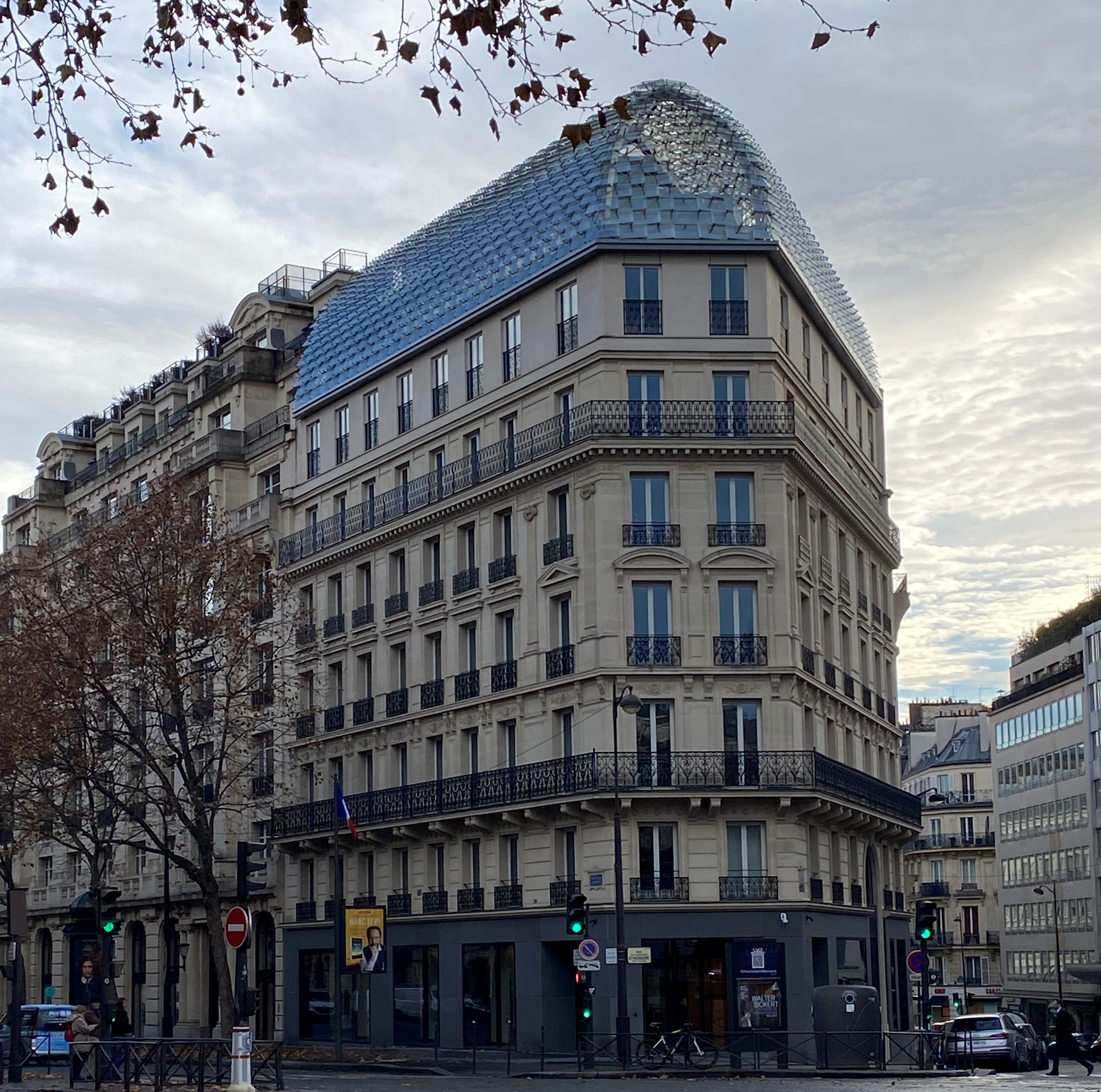
175, boulevard Haussmann, Paris

== Management ==
=== Past chairmen ===
- Alexandre Lazard, Lazare Lazard and Simon Lazard (founders)
- Alexandre Weill
- David David-Weill
- Pierre David-Weill
- André Meyer
- Michel David-Weill
- Ken Costa
- Bruce Wasserstein
- Kenneth M. Jacobs

=== Board of directors ===
Lazard's board of directors as of August 2026:

- Peter R. Orszag
- Dan Schulman
- Kathy Elsesser
- Ann-Kristin Achleitner
- Stephen R. Howe, Jr.
- Michelle Jarrard
- Iris Knobloch
- Peter Harrison
- Dmitry Shevelenko

== Books ==
- de Rougemont, Guy D. (2010). Lazard Frères: Banquiers des Deux Mondes (1840–1939). Paris: Fayard. ISBN 978-2-213-66125-4.
- Cohan, William D. (2007). The Last Tycoons: The Secret History of Lazard Frères & Co. New York: Doubleday. ISBN 978-0-385-51451-4.
- Geisst, Charles R (2001). The Last Partnerships: Inside the Great Wall Street Money Dynasties. New York: McGraw-Hill. ISBN 0-07-136999-6.
- Reich, Cary (1983). Financier: The Biography of André Meyer: A Story of Money, Power, and the Reshaping of American Business. New York: William Morrow & Co. ISBN 0-688-01551-4.

== See also ==
- List of investment banks
- Boutique investment bank
- Lazard Station in Montreal was built in 1918 and believed to be named in their honor as the firm was responsible for financing the Mont Royal Tunnel. Renamed in 1926 as Val-Royal and demolished in 1995.
