= TSC =

TSC may refer to:

== Organizations ==
- Taiwan Semiconductor Company Limited, a Taiwanese semiconductor company
- Technology Service Corporation, a US engineering company
- Terrorist Screening Center, a division of the National Security Branch of the US Federal Bureau of Investigation
- The Shopping Channel, a Canadian television network
- The Soufan Center, an independent research center on global security matters
- The Support Center, in Durham, North Carolina, US
- Tractor Supply Company, a US farm supply and home-improvement retail chain
- The Spaceship Company, a British/American spaceship manufacturing company
- Technical Systems Consultants, a defunct supplier of software for SWTPC computers
- Temporary Slavery Commission, abolitionist organization at the League of Nations
- Teridian Semiconductor, a fabless semiconductor company in Irvine, California, US
- Air Transat (ICAO code), an airline based in Montreal, Canada
- The Transport Systems Catapult, which in April 2019 became the Connected Places Catapult
- FK TSC, a Serbian association football club

=== Education ===
- Tallahassee State College, public college in Tallahassee, Florida, U.S.
- Teacher-Student Centre, University of Dhaka, Bangladesh
- Texas Southmost College, a community college in Brownsville, US
- Thebarton Senior College, a public school in Adelaide, Australia
- Time to Succeed Coalition, an education non-profit in Boston, US
- Training Ship Chanakya, a nautical science college in Mumbai, India
- The Scots College, a private school in Sydney, Australia
- Teachers Service Commission, a Kenyan organization that registers, employs, promotes and pays Kenyan teachers
- Trinidad State College, a public community college in Trinidad, Colorado

== Science and technology ==
- Thiazide-sensitive Na-Cl cotransporter, a carrier protein inhibited by so-called thiazides
- Tuberous sclerosis complex, a rare genetic disorder
  - Tuberous sclerosis protein, the associated protein
- Trans sodium crocetinate, an oxygen diffusion-enhancing compound
- Thyristor switched capacitor, a feature in some AC power transmission systems

=== Computing ===
- Terminal Services Client, software for remote control of Microsoft Windows which in 2001 became Remote Desktop Connection
- Time Stamp Counter, an internal clock present in the IA-32 architecture since the Pentium processor

== Arts and entertainment ==
- Ten Silver Coins, a 2009 novel
- TV Setouchi, a TV station in Japan
- The Shopping Channel, a cable television network available in Canada
- Tech Support Comedy, a web-based community for tech support workers
- The Secret Circle (TV series), an American television series

== Other uses ==
- The Standard Code of Parliamentary Procedure, a manual on US parliamentary law
- Texas State Cemetery, in Austin, Texas, US
- Total Sanitation Campaign, former name of a program in India
- Turkvision Song Contest, a song contest for countries and regions which are of Turkic-speaking or Turkic ethnicity.
