= Eakes =

Eakes is a surname. Notable people with the surname include:

- Bobbie Eakes (born 1961), American actress and singer
- Martin Daniel Eakes (fl. from 1980), American businessman
- Mike Eakes (1945–2005), American politician
