= The Support Center =

American nonprofit based in North Carolina

- Founded: 1990
- Founder: Lenwood V. Long, Sr., Martin D. Eakes
- Purpose: Small business, Housing, Credit Unions
- Location: Raleigh, North Carolina
- Region served: North Carolina
- Key people: President and CEO Lenwood V. Long, Sr.
- Website: http://www.thesupportcenter-nc.org

The Support Center (TSC or formerly known as the North Carolina Minority Support Center) is a not-for-profit organization and a community development financial institution (CDFI), based in Raleigh, North Carolina. It is a statewide nonprofit that partners with Community Development Credit Unions (CDCUs) and community-based organizations to provide small business and mortgage lending services to its members; and to provide training, grants, and loans to create economic opportunities for individuals, families, and communities in underserved markets.

== History ==
The Support Center was founded in 1990 by Lenwood V. Long, Sr. and Martin D. Eakes. Later, Saundra Scales of the School Workers Federal Credit Union and Jim Gilliam of St. Luke joined The Support Center.

== Services ==
Throughout its history, The Support Center has offered its affiliates the following services: technical assistance, capital support, advocacy, marketing, financial education, capital grants and youth financial education. However, due to consolidation and mergers after the 2008 financial crisis, The Support Center now focuses mainly on Small Business Lending, Policy & Research, Technical Assistance and Capital Support.

=== Small business lending programs ===
The Support Center offers loans directly as well as through their affiliated credit unions with support from federal and state funding. It focuses on specific loan products that are not easily available through traditional bank services. They are currently offering two programs for small business owners: USDA Intermediary Relending Program (IRP) and NC Small Business Development Loan Program.

=== Policy and research ===
The Support Center helps its affiliates with publishing white papers, impact studies and surveys that address specific issues that relate directly to CDCUs and other community focused financial service groups.

=== Technical assistance ===
Technical Assistance include its compliance and regulation services along with brokering assistance with marketing, grant writing and other operational needs. It will also include offering assistance in matching USDA housing financing programs with those offered by our affiliates.

=== Capital support ===
Capital support service will be offering assistance with generating general deposits, secondary capital and lending funds for its affiliates.

== Affiliates ==
Currently, The Support Center has six CDCU affiliates with more than 110,000 members at 26 branches across the state of North Carolina:

- First Legacy Community Credit Union
- Generations Community Credit Union
- Greater Kinston Credit Union
- Latino Community Credit Union
- Self-Help Credit Union
- Shepherd’s Federal Credit Union

== Recognitions ==
The North Carolina Minority Support Center has been recognized by The Ford Foundation, the White House Partnership for Prosperity, and the World Council of Credit Unions as a national and international model for banking the unbanked and low wealth communities.

== Issues ==
In recent years, The Support Center is facing three main issues in helping underserved market:

1. Helping start-up businesses gain get access to capital
2. Providing Getting affordable capital to people in low-wealth and underserved markets
3. Showing the impacts the community-based groups have in the local communities
