= Taiwan Semiconductor =

Taiwan Semiconductor may refer to:

- Taiwan Semiconductor Company Limited (TSC)
- Taiwan Semiconductor Manufacturing Company Limited (TSMC)
