= City View Building =

Historic skyscraper in Durham, North Carolina

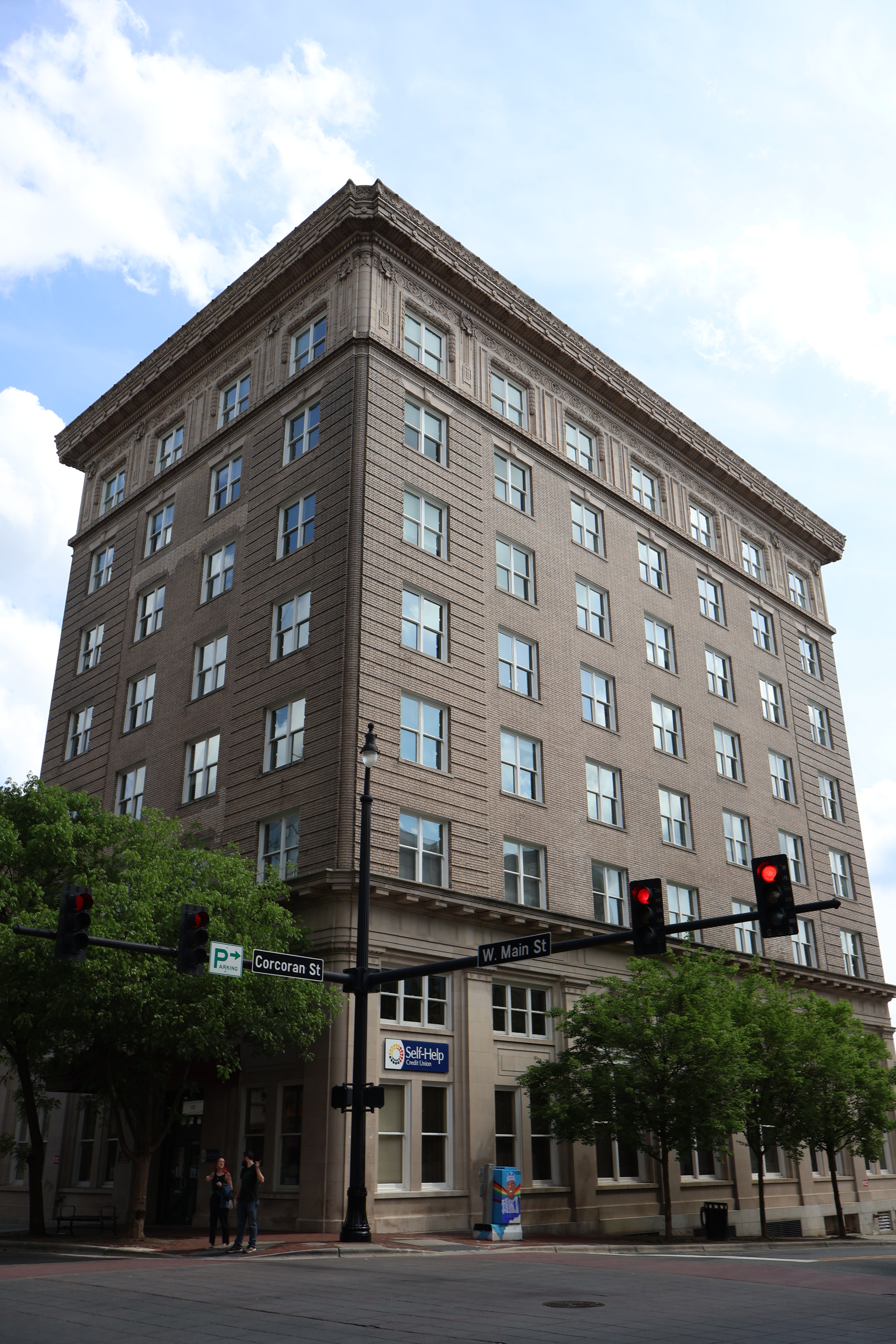
- The building in 2023
- Interactive map of the City View Building area
- Former names: First National Bank

General information
- Status: Active
- Type: office, bank
- Architectural style: Neoclassical
- Location: 123 W Main Street; Durham, North Carolina, U.S.
- Coordinates: 35.9953°N 78.9017°W
- Completed: 1914
- Owner: Center for Community Self-Help

Design and construction
- Architects: Milburn and Heiste

The City View Building, also known as 123 West Main Street and formerly known as the First National Bank of Durham, is a historic skyscraper in the Downtown Historic District in Durham, North Carolina. Since 2001, it has housed the national headquarters of the Center for Community Self-Help.

== History ==
The site of the building was the First National Bank, built as the bank's second location in 1887 by Julian S. Carr. The original red brick Queen Anne-style building was demolished in 1914 and a larger, Neoclassical revival building, featuring seven stories, was built in its place by the architects Milburn and Heiste.

In 2001, the Center for Community Self-Help purchased the building from Carver Investment Group and hired Eddie Belk to help with restoration of the property.
