= School uniform =

Standardized outfit worn by students of an educational institution

Students in school uniforms
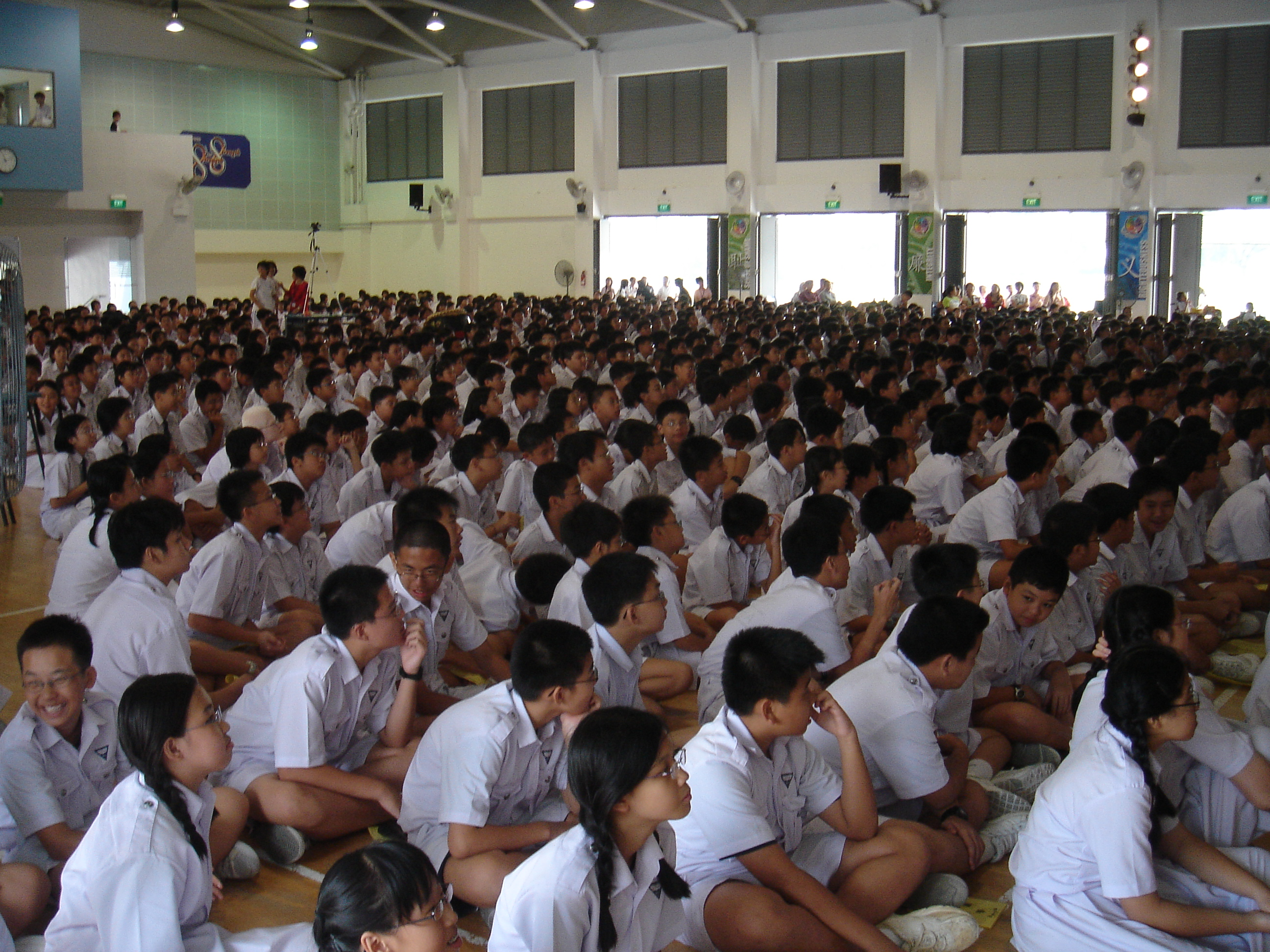
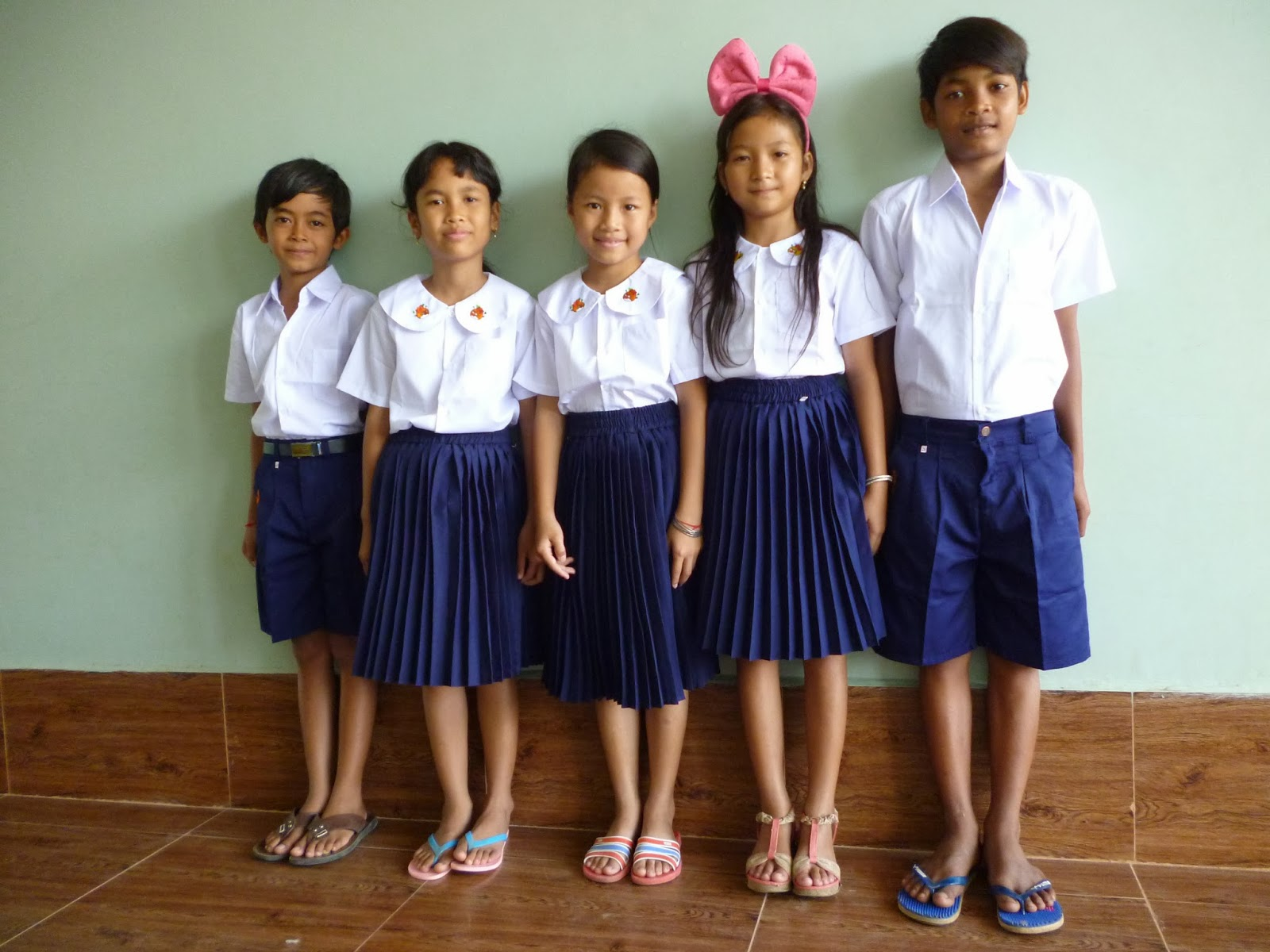
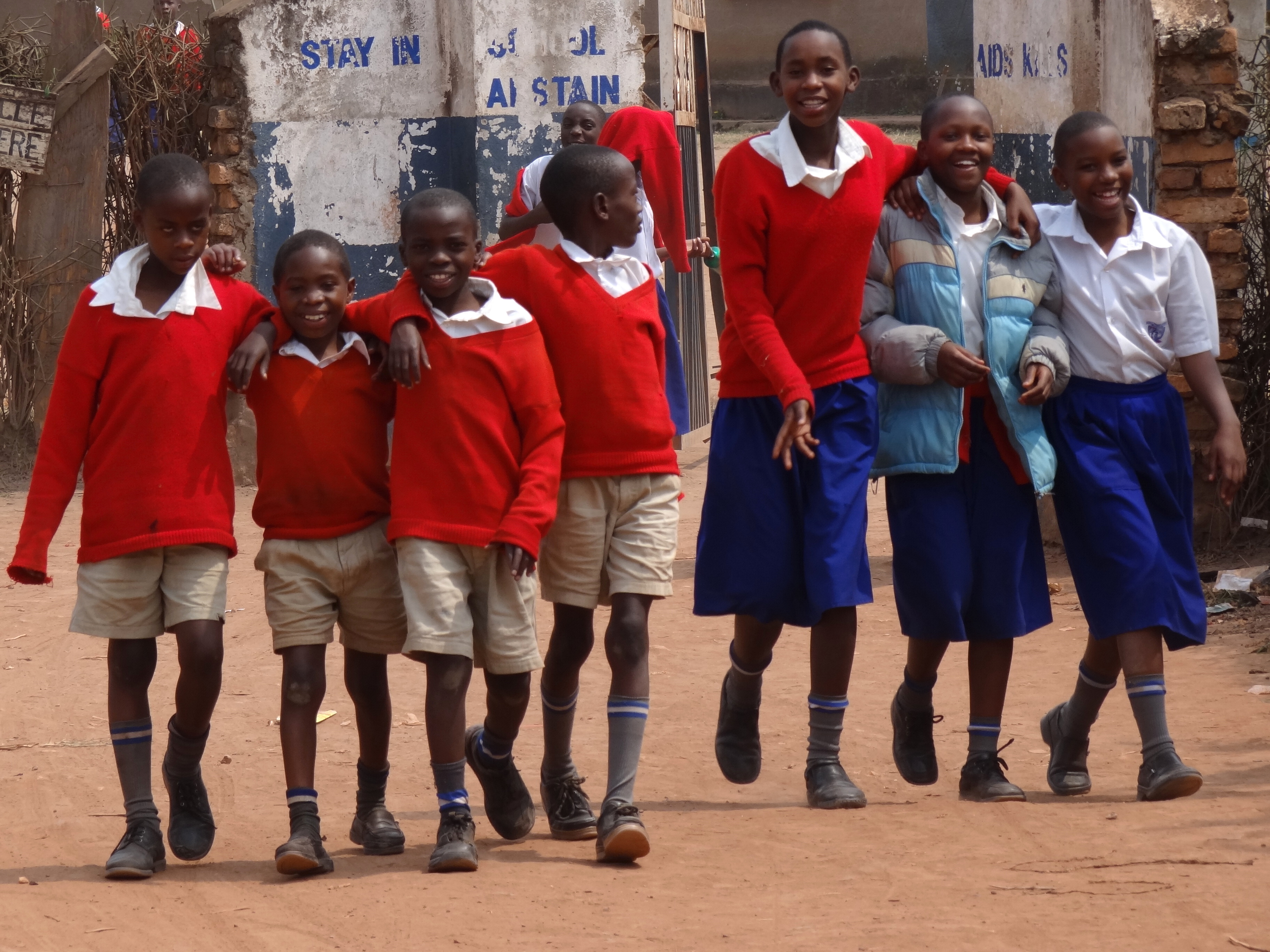
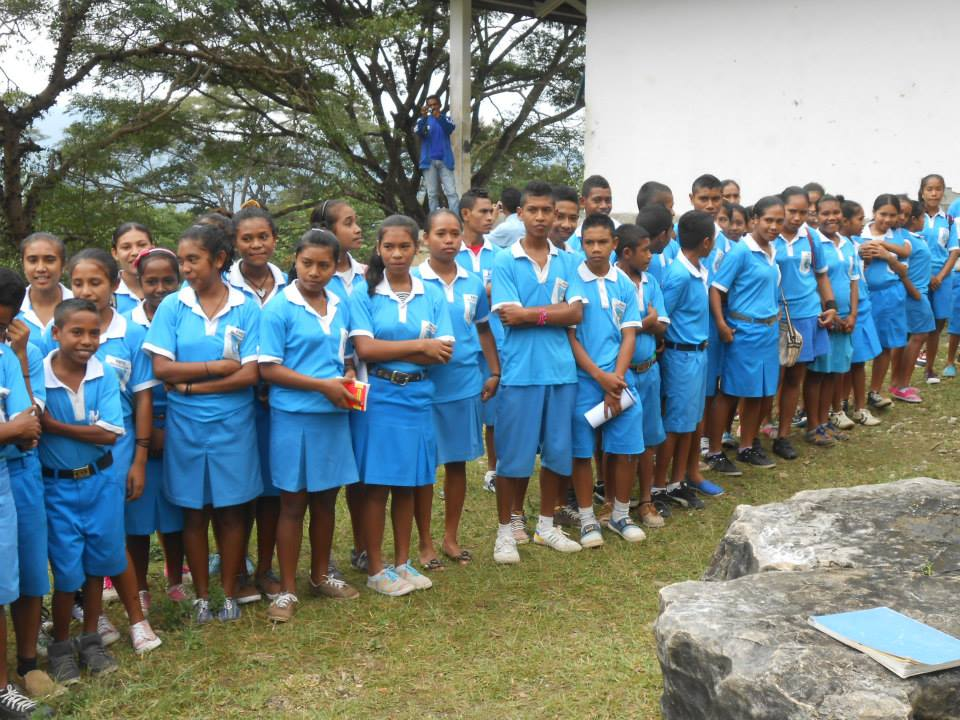
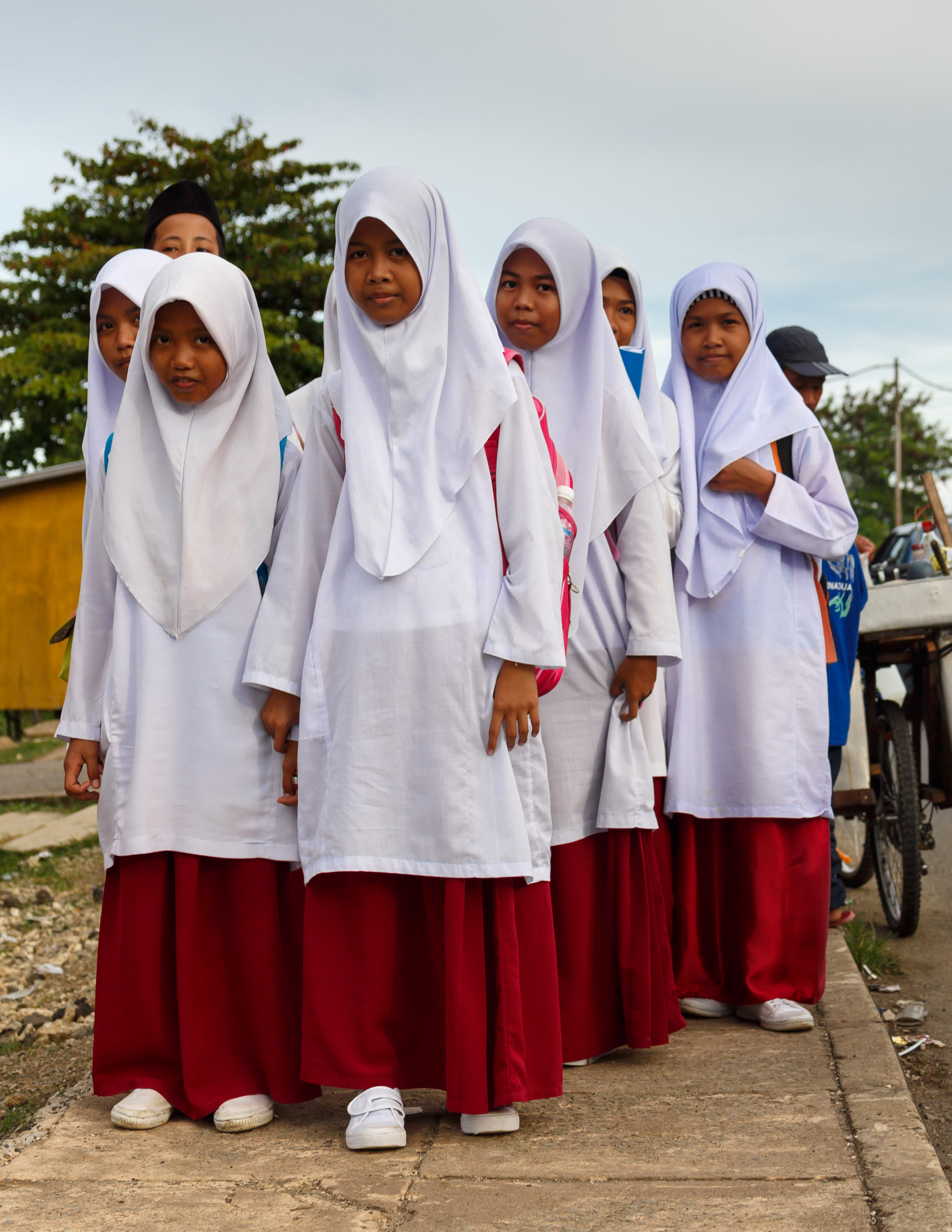
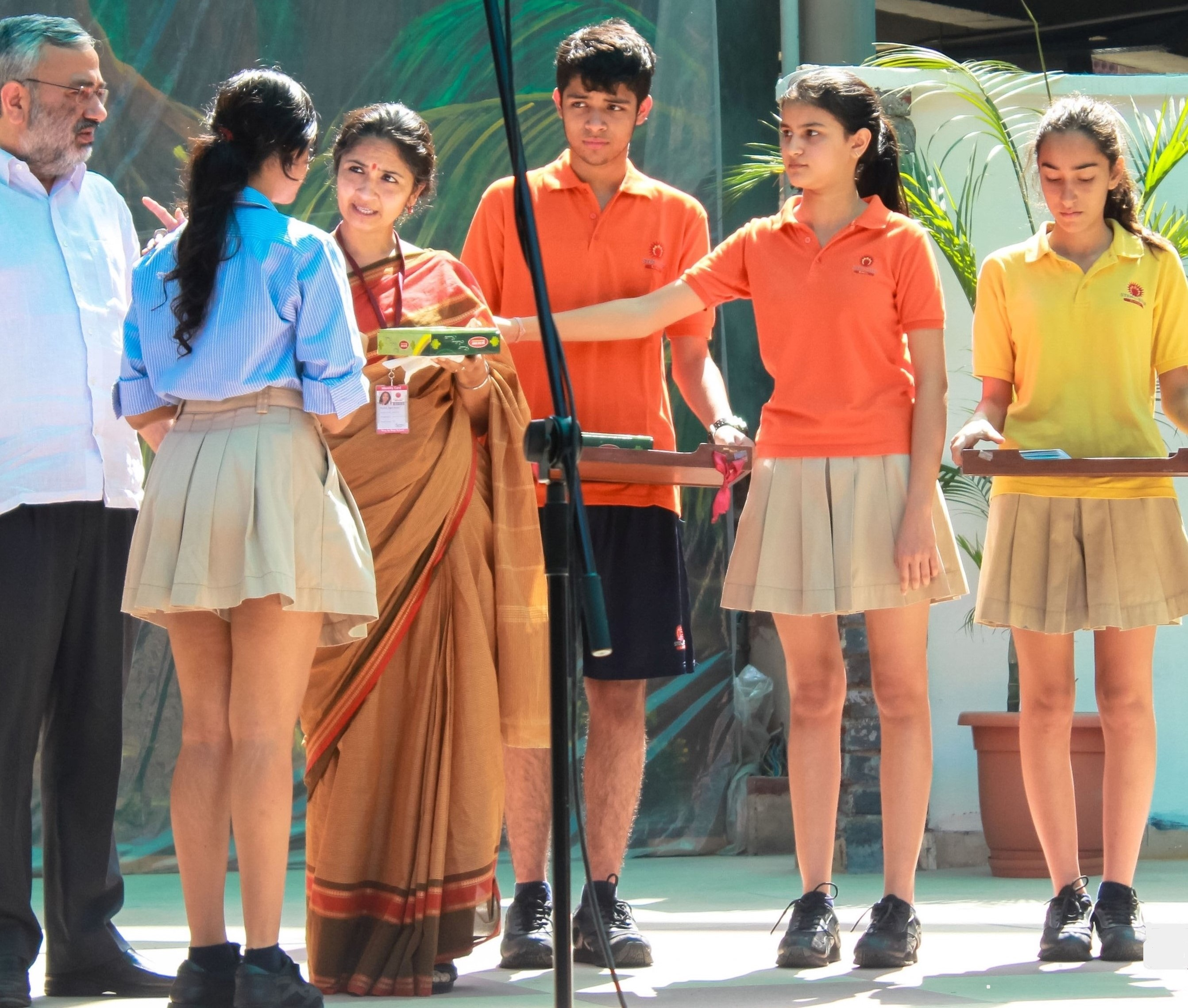

A school uniform is a uniform worn by students primarily for a school or otherwise an educational institution. They are common in primary and secondary schools in various countries and are generally widespread in Africa, Asia, Oceania, the British Isles and much of the Americas, but are not common in the United States, Canada, and most countries in continental Europe.

An example of a uniform would be requiring button-up shirts, trousers for boys, and blouses and pleated skirts for girls, with both wearing blazers. A uniform can even be as simple as requiring collared shirts, or restricting colour choices and limiting items students are allowed to wear.

== Uniform ==
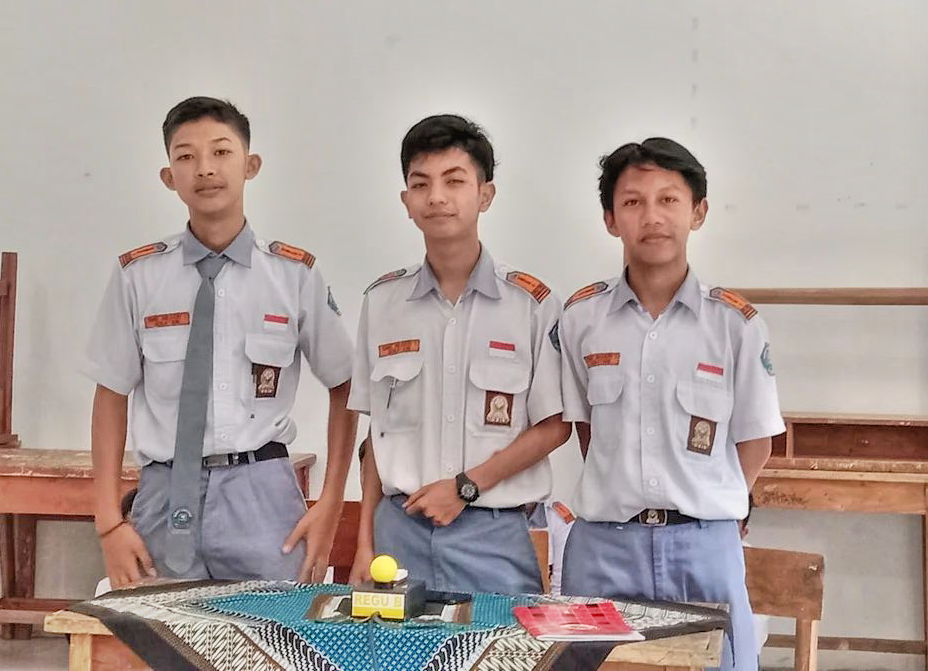
Three students in Indonesia wearing uniforms

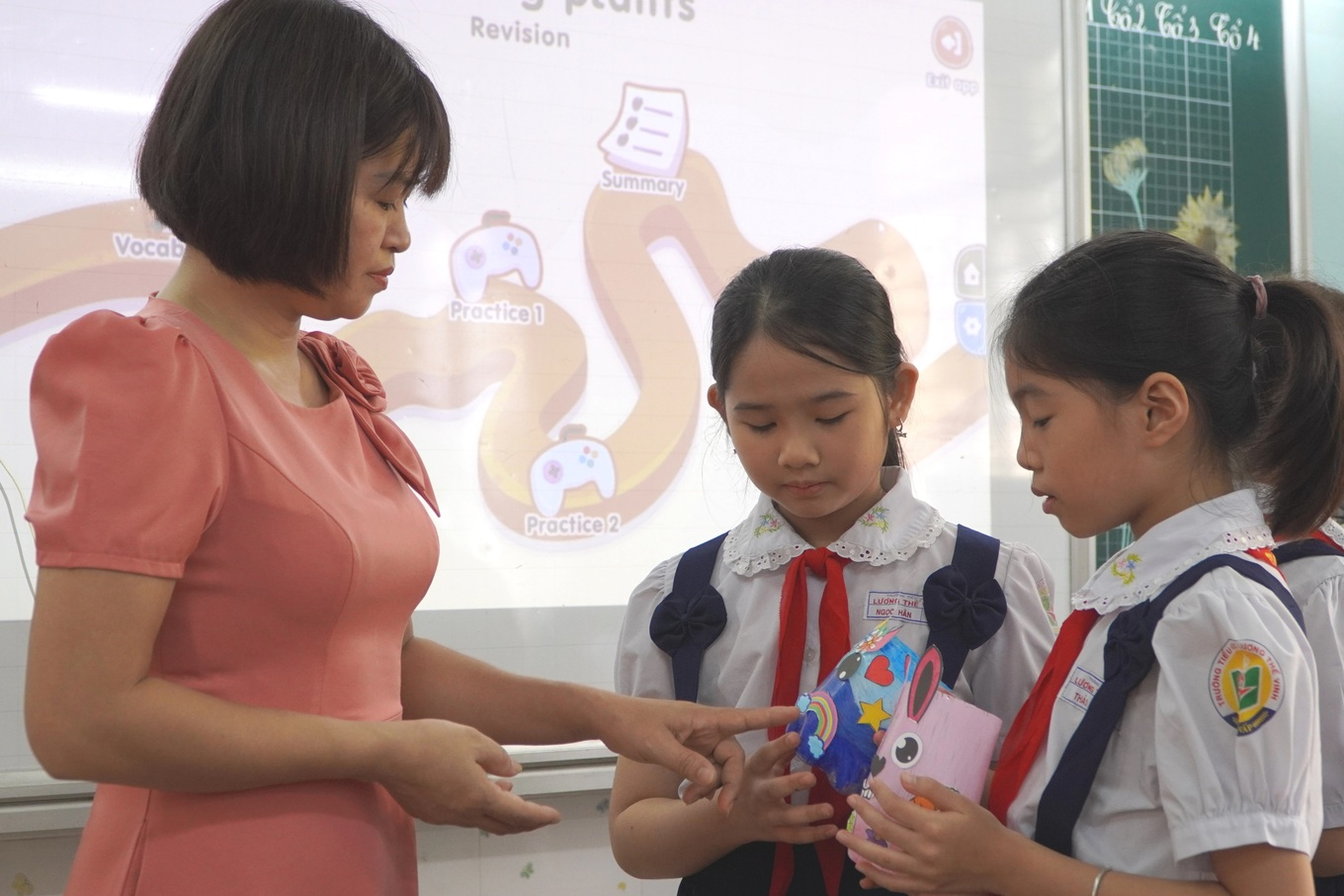
Students wearing uniforms in Vietnam

Although often used interchangeably, there is an important difference between dress codes and school uniforms: according to scholars such as Nathan Joseph, clothing can only be considered a uniform when it "(a) serves as a group emblem, (b) certifies an institution's legitimacy by revealing individual's relative positions and (c) suppresses individuality." Conversely, a dress code is much less restrictive, and focuses "on promoting modesty and discouraging anti-social fashion statements", according to Marian Wilde. Examples of a dress code would be not allowing ripped clothing, no logos or limiting the amount of skin that can be shown.

== History ==
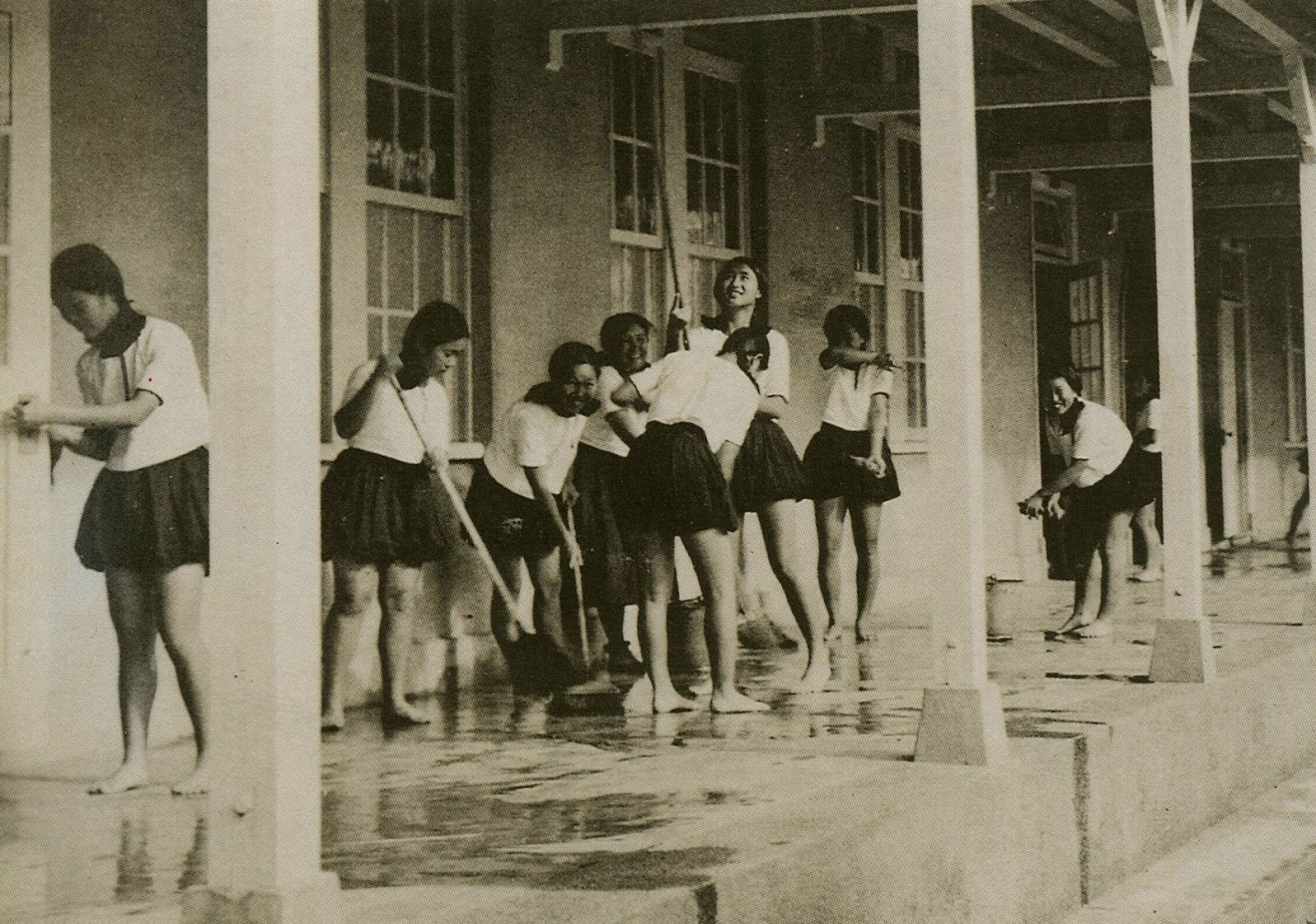
Schoolgirls in Japanese Taiwan, 1927

It is difficult to trace the origins of the uniform as there is no comprehensive written history, but rather a variety of known influences. School uniforms are believed to be a practice which dates to the 16th century in the United Kingdom. It is believed that the Christ's Hospital School in England in 1552 was the first school to use a school uniform. Students were given a uniform that most notably consisted of a long blue coat and yellow, knee-high socks. An almost identical uniform is still worn by students attending the school today. The earliest documented proof of institutionalized use of a standard academic dress dates back to 1222 when the then Archbishop of Canterbury ordered the wearing of the cappa clausa. This monastic and academic practice evolved into collegiate uniforms in England, particularly in charity schools where uniform dress was often provided for poor children. Universities, primary schools and secondary schools used uniforms as a marker of class and status. Although school uniforms can often be considered conservative and old-fashioned, uniforms in recent years have changed as societal dress codes have changed.

== Contemporary ==
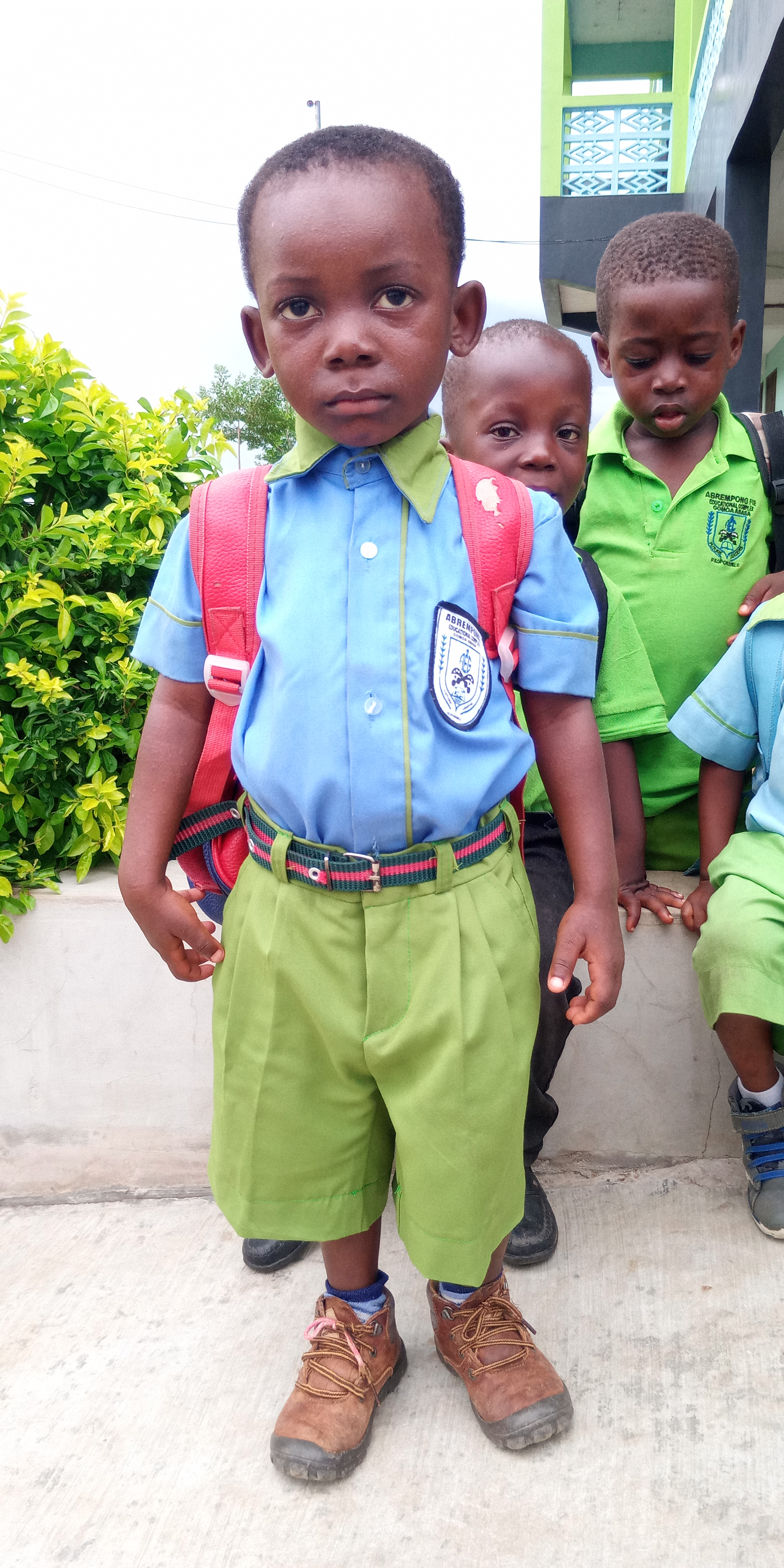
Kindergarten schoolboy in Ghana wearing a school uniform

In the United States, a movement toward using uniforms in state schools began when Bill Clinton addressed it in the 1996 State of the Union, saying: "If it means that teenagers will stop killing each other over designer jackets, then our public schools should be able to require their students to wear uniforms." As of 1998 approximately 25% of all U.S. public elementary, middle and junior high schools had adopted a uniform policy or were considering a policy, and two-thirds were implemented between 1995 and 1997. New York City's then-new schools chancellor, Rudy Crew, made it clear that he would not follow Clinton's idea.

There is an abundance of theories and empirical studies looking at school uniforms, making statements about their effectiveness. These theories and studies elaborate on the benefits and also the shortcomings of uniform policies. The issue of nature vs. nurture comes into play, as uniforms affect the perceptions of masculinity and femininity, over-simplify issues of gender classification, and attempt to suppress students' sexuality. Uniforms bring a variety of pros, cons, and major legal implications and controversies.

There are two main empirical findings that are most often cited in the political rhetoric surrounding the uniform debate. One of these, the case study of the Long Beach Unified School District, is most often cited in support of school uniforms and their effectiveness whereas Effects of Student Uniforms on Attendance, Behavior Problems, Substance Use, and Academic Achievement is the most frequently cited research in opposition to the implementation of school uniform policies.

=== Effects of uniforms on students ===
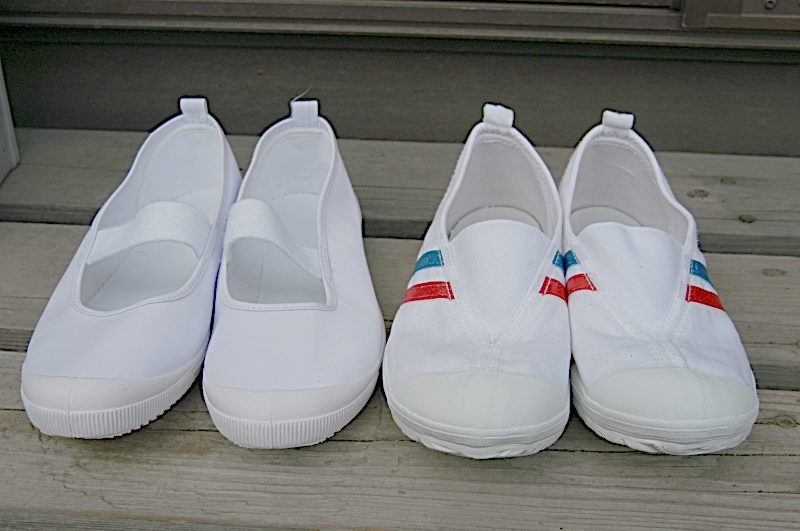
In many Japanese schools, students take off their outdoor shoes and wear uwabaki, an indoor soft slipper.

The case study of the Long Beach Unified School District was the study of the first large, urban school in the United States to implement a uniform policy. In 1994, mandatory school uniforms were implemented for the districts elementary and middle schools as a strategy to address the students' behavior issues. The district simultaneously implemented a longitudinal study to research the effects of the uniforms on student behavior. The study attributed favorable student behavioral changes and a significant drop in school discipline issues to the mandatory uniform policy. Wearing school uniforms was associated with fewer absences and truancies and fewer referrals to the office for behavior problems. Suspensions and expulsions were reduced by 28% (elementary) and 36% (middle school), crime and vandalism by 74% (elementary) and 18% (middle school). However the school district also added other security measures such as security guards, and metal detectors so the success cannot be solely attributed to the uniforms. The district later removed the uniforms.

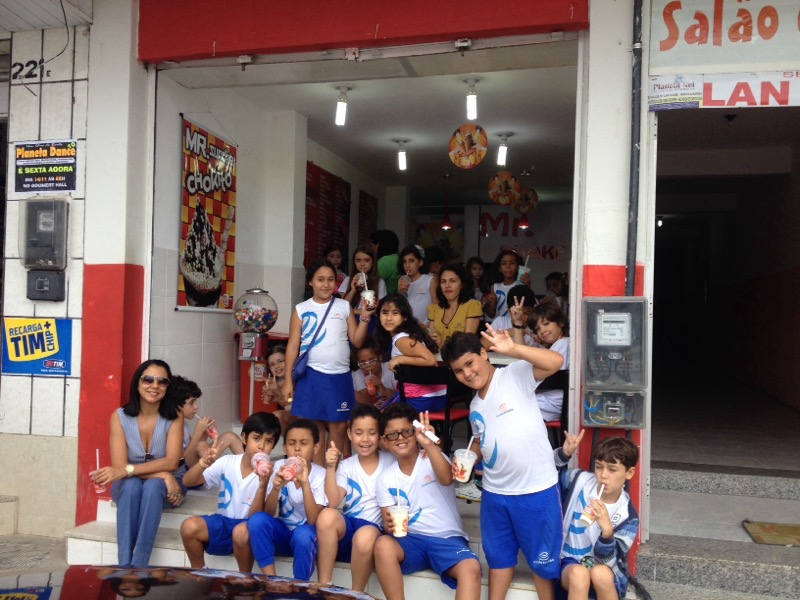
Brazilian primary school students with their teacher

Other research found that uniforms were not an effective deterrent to decrease truancy, did not decrease behavior problems, decrease substance use, and in fact may be associated with poorer student achievement relative to students not required to wear school uniforms.

Brunsma stated that despite the inconclusiveness of the effects of uniforms, they became more common because "this is an issue of children's rights, of social control, and one related to increasing racial, class and gender inequalities in our schools."

== Laws and rulings ==
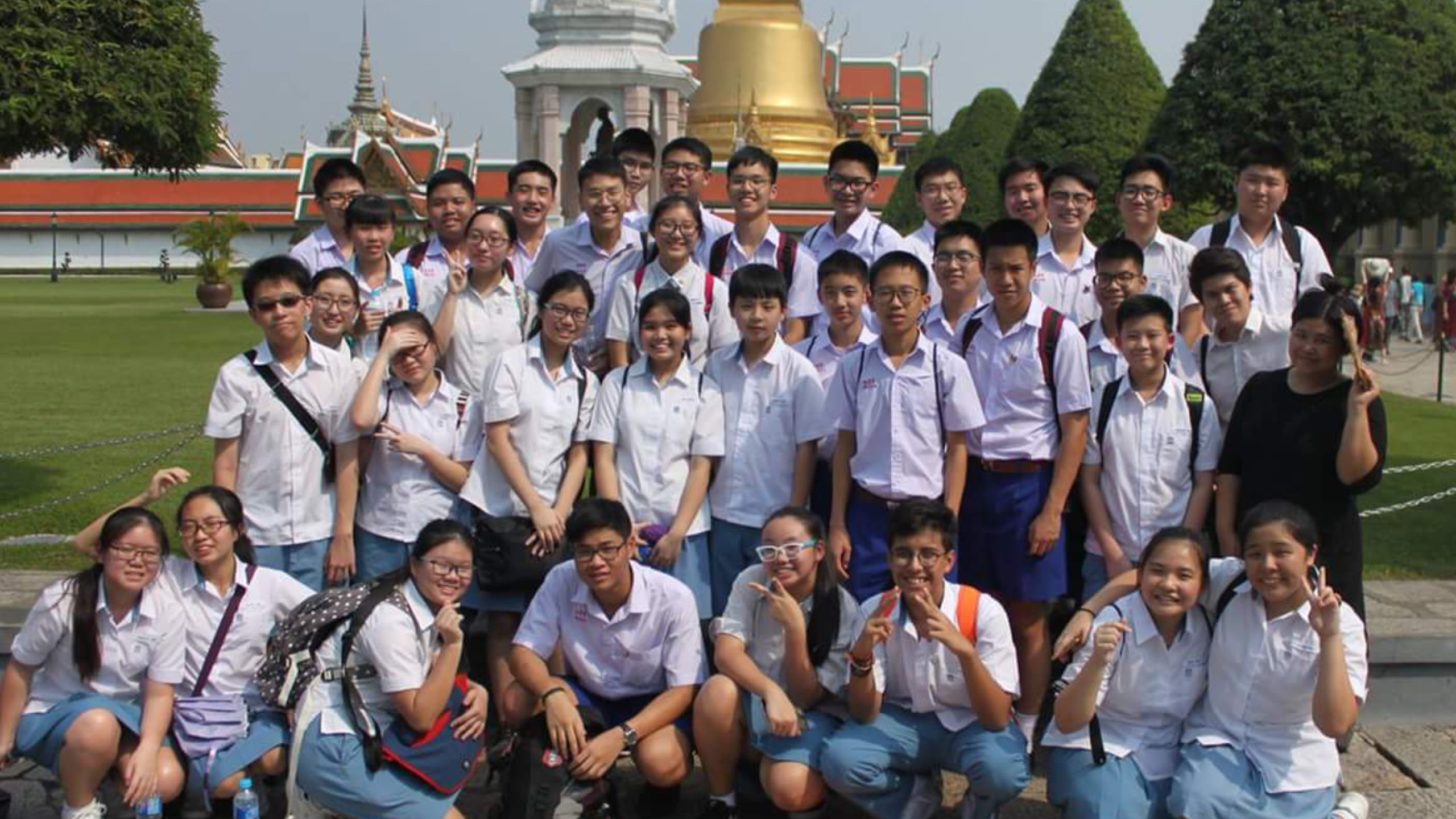
A group picture of Thai students (uniforms with dark blue shorts) and Singaporean students (uniforms with cyan skirts and shorts) in front of the Grand Palace

As uniforms have become more normalised, there have also been an increasing number of lawsuits brought against school districts. According to David Brunsma, one in four public elementary schools and one in eight public middle and high schools in the United States have policies dictating what a student wears to school. The school code within states' constitutions typically asserts that it allows the board of school directors to make reasonable rules and regulations as they see fit in managing the school's affairs. As of 2025, there are currently 22 states that allow school districts to mandate school uniforms. The constitutional objections usually brought upon school districts tend to fall into one of the following two categories: (1) a violation of the students' First Amendment right to free expression (2) a violation of parents' right to raise their children without government interference. Although up until this point, The Supreme Court has not ruled on a case involving school uniforms directly, in the 1968 decision Tinker v. Des Moines Independent Community School District, the Court ruled that upon entering school, students do not shed their constitutional rights to freedom of speech.

Internationally, there are differing views of school uniforms. In the Australian state of Queensland, Ombudsman Fred Albietz ruled in 1998 that state schools may not require uniforms. In the Philippines, the Department of Education abolished the requirement of school uniforms in public schools. In England and Wales, technically a state school may not permanently exclude students for "breaching school uniform policy", under a policy promulgated by the Department for Children, Schools and Families but students not wearing the correct uniform are asked to go home and change. In Scotland, some local councils (that have responsibility for delivering state education) do not insist on students wearing a uniform as a precondition to attending and taking part in curricular activities. Turkey abolished mandatory uniforms in 2010.

=== Examples of lawsuits in the United States ===
==== Canady v. Bossier Parish School Board ====
In the Canady v. Bossier Parish School Board lawsuit in 2000, a Louisiana district court ruled in favour of the school board because it did not see how the free speech rights of the students were being violated due to the school board's uniform policy. Even though the plaintiff appealed the decision, the Fifth Circuit Court also ruled in favour of the school board after implementing a four-step system that is still used today. Firstly, a school board has to have the right to set up a policy. Secondly, the policy must be determined to support a fundamental interest of the board as a whole. Thirdly, the guidelines cannot have been set for the purpose of censorship. Finally, the limits on student expression cannot be greater than the interest of the board. As long as these four policies are in place, then no constitutional violation can be claimed.

==== Littlefield v. Forney Independent School District ====
In the Forney Independent School District of Forney, Texas in 2001, the school board decided to implement a school uniform policy allowing the students to wear a polo shirt, oxford shirt or blouse in four possible colours, and blue or khaki trousers or shirts, a skirt or jumper. While there was some flexibility with shoes, certain types were prohibited along with any sort of baggy clothes. The parents of the Littlefield family requested that their son be exempt from the policy, but were denied. In response, the Littlefields filed a lawsuit against the school district, under the pretenses that this uniform mandate infringed on their rights as parents to control how they brought up their children and their education. They even went as far as to cite an infringement on religious freedom, claiming that opting out of the uniforms on the grounds of religion allowed the school to rank the validity of certain religions. Before trial, the District Court dismissed the case, so the family appealed. Ultimately, the Fifth Circuit Court ruled that the students' rights were not being violated even though the claims presented were valid. They ruled that school rules derived from the education would override the parents' right to control their children's upbringing in this specific situation. As far as the religious freedom violation accusations, the court ruled that the policy did not have a religious goal, and thus did not infringe on religious freedom rights.

==== Jacobs v. Clark County School District ====
In 2003, Liberty High School, a school of the Clark County School District in Henderson, Nevada, implemented a uniform policy of khakis and red, white or blue polo shirts. A junior by the name of Kimberly Jacobs was suspended a total of five times because she wore a religious shirt to school and got cited for uniform violations. Her family sued the Clark County School District under the claims that her First Amendment rights were being infringed upon and that the uniform policy was causing students to be deprived of due process. The plaintiff's requests were for injunctive relief, the expunging of suspensions from Jacob's school record and awarding of damages. The injunction was granted to the family meaning that the school could no longer discipline her for breaking the uniform policy. At this ruling, the school district appealed. The next court ruled on the side of the school district as it determined that the uniform policy was in fact neutral and constitutional, and it dismissed the claims of the plaintiff.

==== Frudden v. Washoe County School District ====
In 2011, a Nevada public elementary school of the Washoe County School District decided to add the school's motto, Tomorrow's Leaders embroidered in small letters on the shirt. In response, Mary and John Frudden, parents of a student sued the school district on the basis of it violating the First Amendment. The court ultimately dismissed the case filed by the Fruddens over the uniforms. However, the family appealed, and two years later, a three-judge panel of the 9th U.S. Circuit Court of Appeals heard the case. The court ruled to reverse the previous decision of dismissing the case, and also questioned the apparent policy for students that were part of a nationally recognised group such as Boy Scouts and Girl Scouts who were able to wear the uniforms in place of the school ones on regular meeting days. The 9th circuit panel ruled that the school had not provided enough evidence for why it instituted this policy, and that the family was never given a chance to argue.

==== Peltier v. Charter Day School ====
In Peltier v. Charter Day School (2022), the United States Court of Appeals for the Fourth Circuit held that a North Carolina charter school's skirts-only requirement for girls violated the Equal Protection Clause and that Title IX applies to sex-based school dress codes.

== Social implications of school uniforms on gender ==
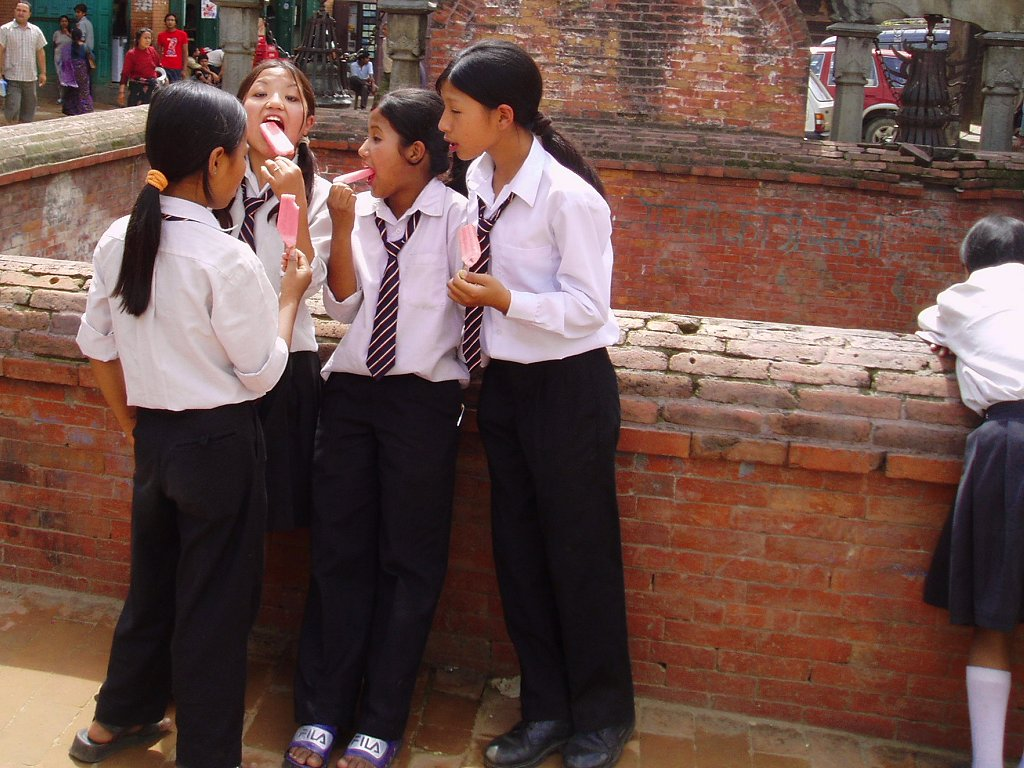
Schoolgirls in Nepal. Some school uniform policies (e.g. Vietnam) include trousers for girls.

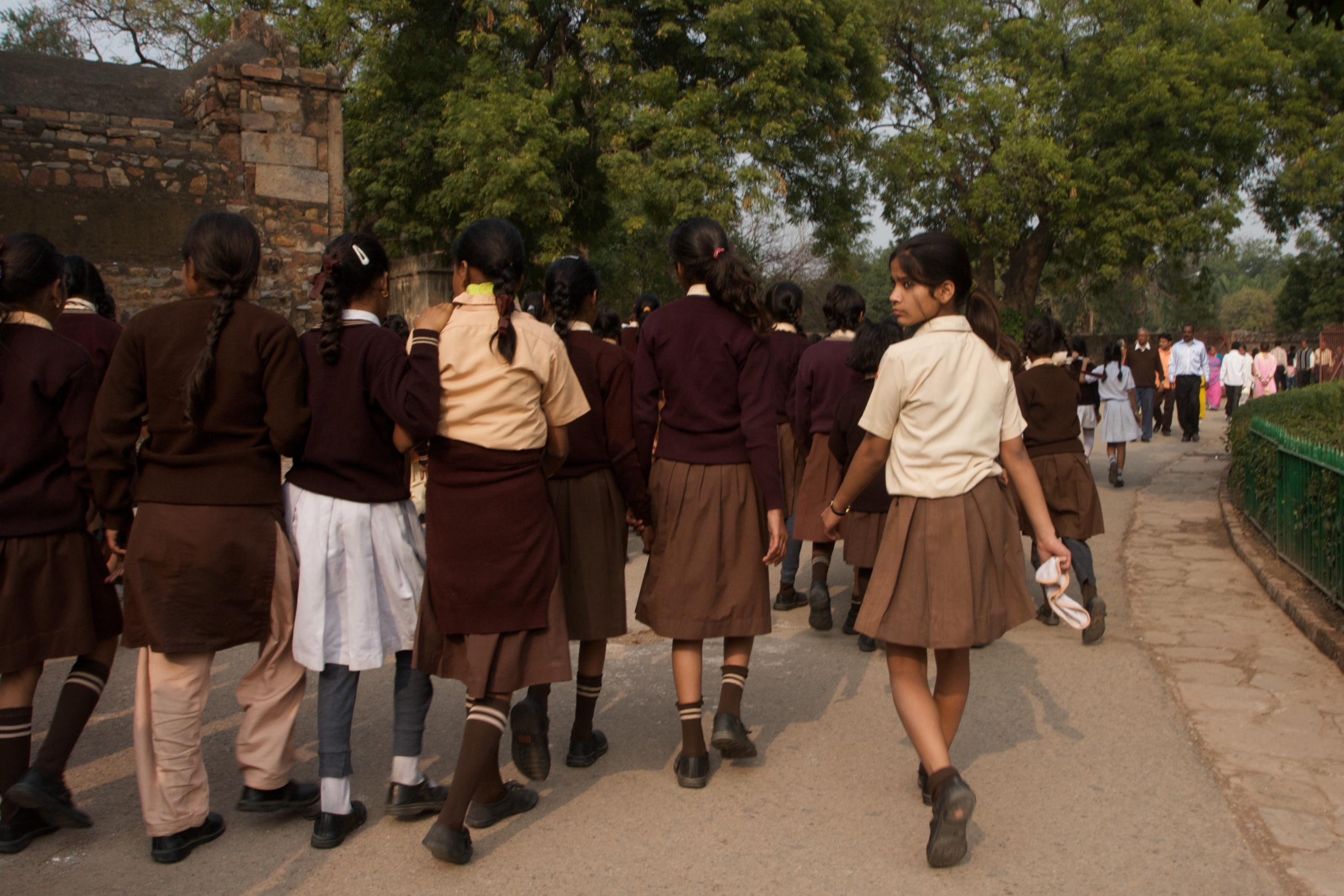
School girls in parts of South Asia can choose between skirts or shalwar kameez.

=== Perceptions of masculinity and femininity ===
One of the criticisms of uniforms is that it imposes standards of masculinity and femininity from a young age. Uniforms are considered a form of discipline that schools use to control student behavior and often promote conventional gendered dress.

Boys often are required to wear trousers, belts, and closed-toe shoes and have their shirts tucked in at all times. They are also often required to have their hair cut short. Some critics allege that this uniform is associated with the dress of a professional business man, which, they claim, gives boys at a young age the impression that masculinity is gained through business success.

For girls, many uniforms promote femininity by requiring girls to wear skirts. Skirts are seen by some critics as a symbol of femininity because they restrict movement and force certain ways of sitting and playing. Uniforms that include an apron for girls may suggest that the appropriate feminine societal role is a primarily domestic one. Some girls' school uniforms have been criticized as having an uncomfortable design, which prevents girls from freedom of movement and exposes girls to cold during winter.

School uniforms are embedded with gender symbolism. Schools that require students to wear a formal uniform almost universally provide trousers for boys and skirts or dresses for girls. Skirts differentiate the female from the male, thereby confirming traditional gender identities for students who must wear the correct attire corresponding to their sex. Skirts and dresses demand a particular type of feminine gender performance, whereas trousers demand a particular masculine gender performance. By forcing students to wear attire that corresponds with their sex inherently assigns the ways a student must perform their gender. This causes controversy when a student does not want to identify with a gender that does not align with their sex. There are rarely guidelines that allow for students to dress according to their performed gender, though almost always according to their sex assigned at birth.

=== Sexualization of girls ===
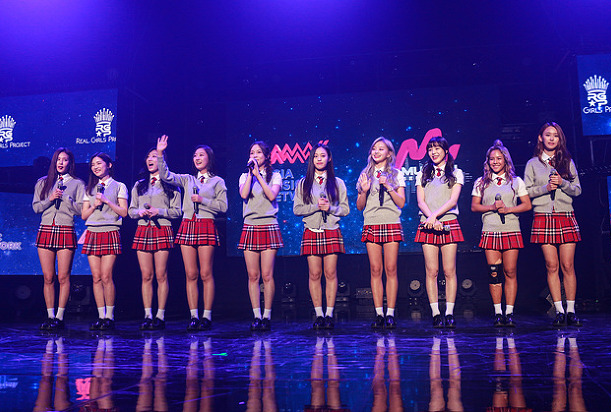
A K-pop all-girls band group wearing uniform-like costumes during a performance, 2017

Around middle or junior school, students begin going through puberty. Uniforms can be seen as a way to restrict the sexualization of girls by taking the focus away from sexuality and focus it on academics in a school setting for girls.

Sometimes the desire to prevent overtly sexualized clothing through uniforms can fail. As an example, miniskirts have been very popular in Japan, where they are common parts of school uniforms and came to be worn within the Kogal culture.

"The pleasure our culture derives from gazing at girls who look feminine conflicts with girls' freedom to run around unselfconsciously and to develop their gross motor talents as boys are encouraged to do" (Collins et al. 1996, p. 170). Schoolgirl uniforms are used in costumes in the context of "Sexy Schoolgirl" and are sold on costume sites year round. The idea of the female school uniform has become sexual and in Britain a new survey from Plan International UK found that a third of girls have been sexually harassed while wearing their school uniform. School uniforms can encourage harassment as children, as some cultures can define the "schoolgirl look" as sexual. Children as young as 8 years old report being victims of, or witnesses to, harassment. Two-thirds of the children questioned in the survey said they have experienced "unwanted sexual attention" in public, and 35 percent said they have been touched, groped or grabbed without their consent. These experiences teach girls that being harassed by men is just a part of growing up. The perception of schoolgirl uniforms allows for men to harass girls at a young age, causing girls to self-objectify their bodies from the beginning of their schooling experience.

== Controversies ==
=== General ===
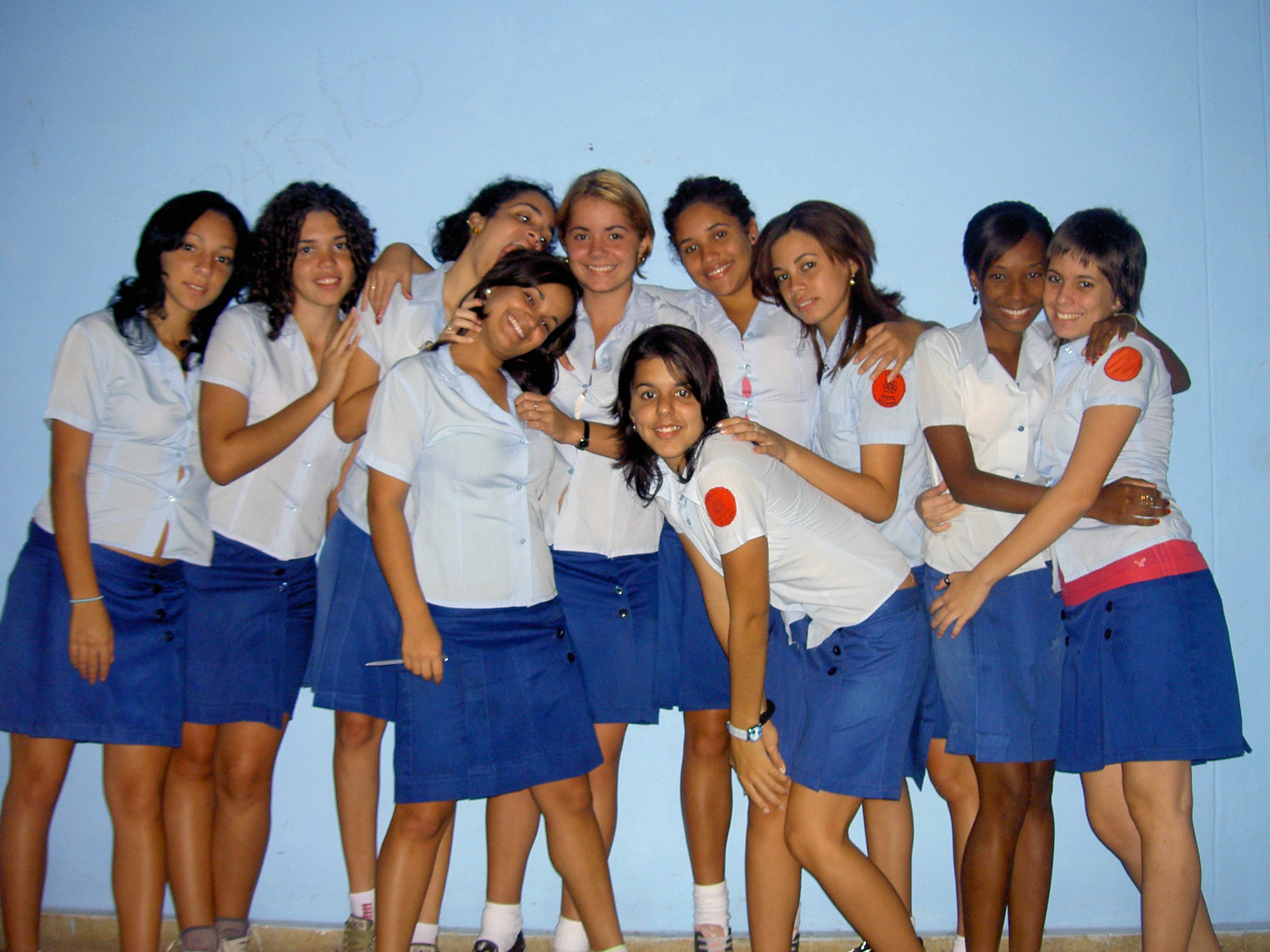
Cuban high-school girls, 2009

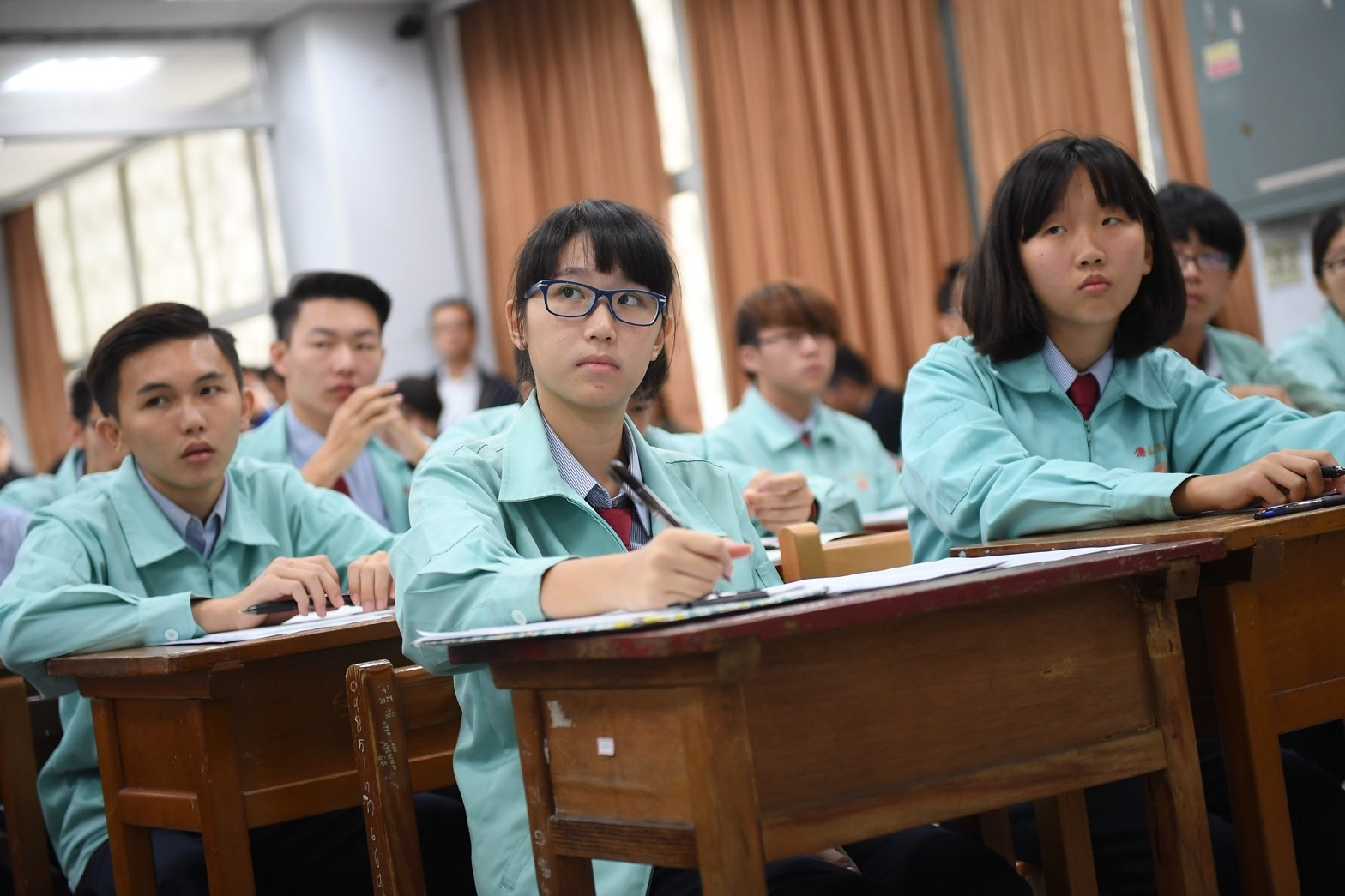
Pupils in Taiwan

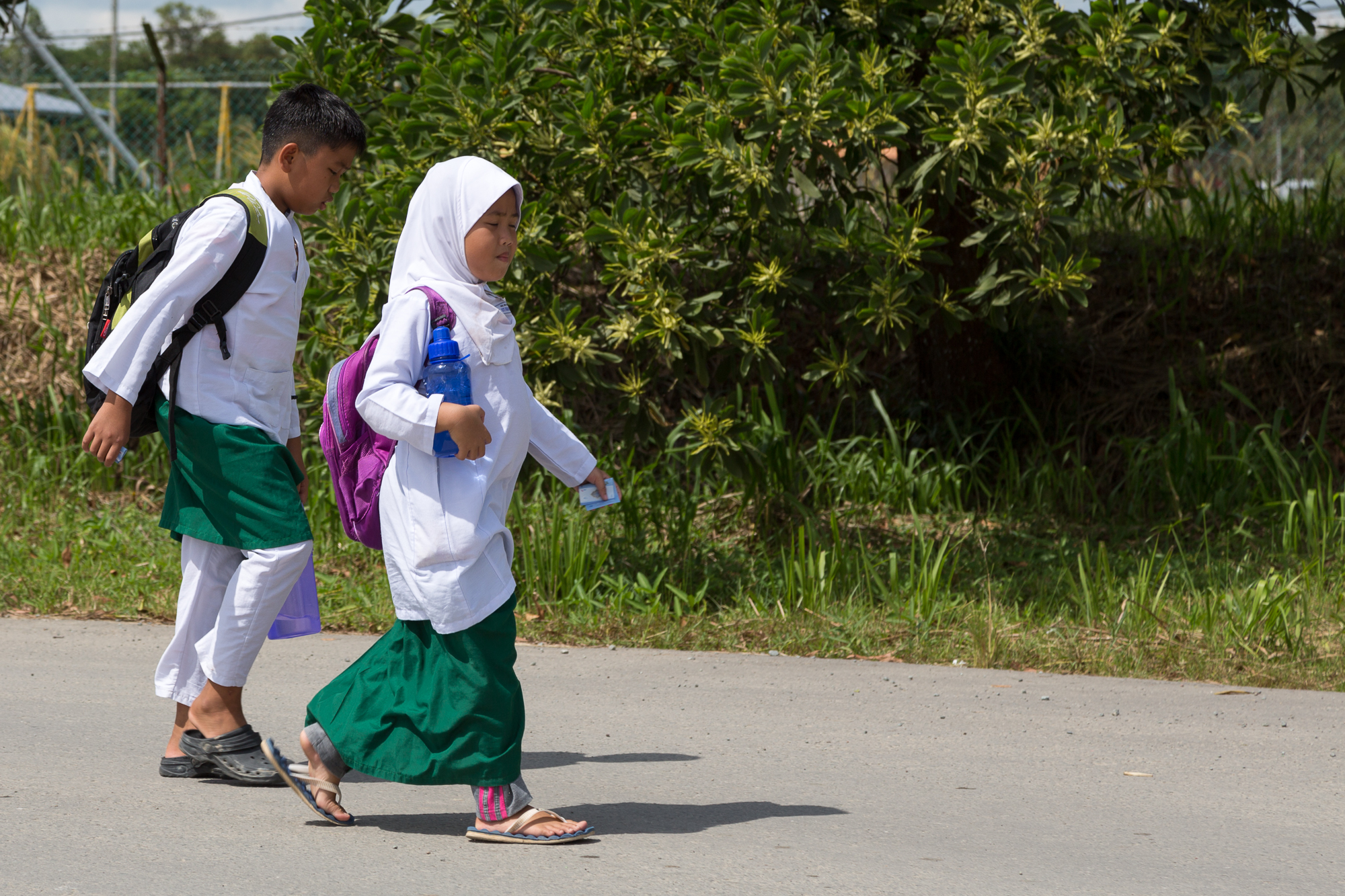
Primary school boy and girl in Malaysia

In some cultures, the topic of school uniforms has sparked a multitude of controversies and debates over the years. Debates concerning the constitutionality and economic feasibility of uniforms also contribute to the controversy.

In the United States, the implementation of school uniforms began following ten years of research indicating the effectiveness of private schools. Some state-school reformers cited this research to support policies linked to private and Catholic school success. Some public-school administrators hence began implementing uniform policies to improve the overall school environment and academic achievement of the students. This is based on the assumption that uniforms are the direct cause of behavioral and academic outcome changes. However, within the Catholic school literature, school uniforms have never been acknowledged as a primary factor in producing a Catholic school effect.

Another area of controversy regarding school uniform and dress code policies revolve around the issue of gender. Nowadays, more teenagers are more frequently "dressing to articulate, or confound gender identity and sexual orientation", which brings about "responses from school officials that ranged from indifferences to applause to bans".

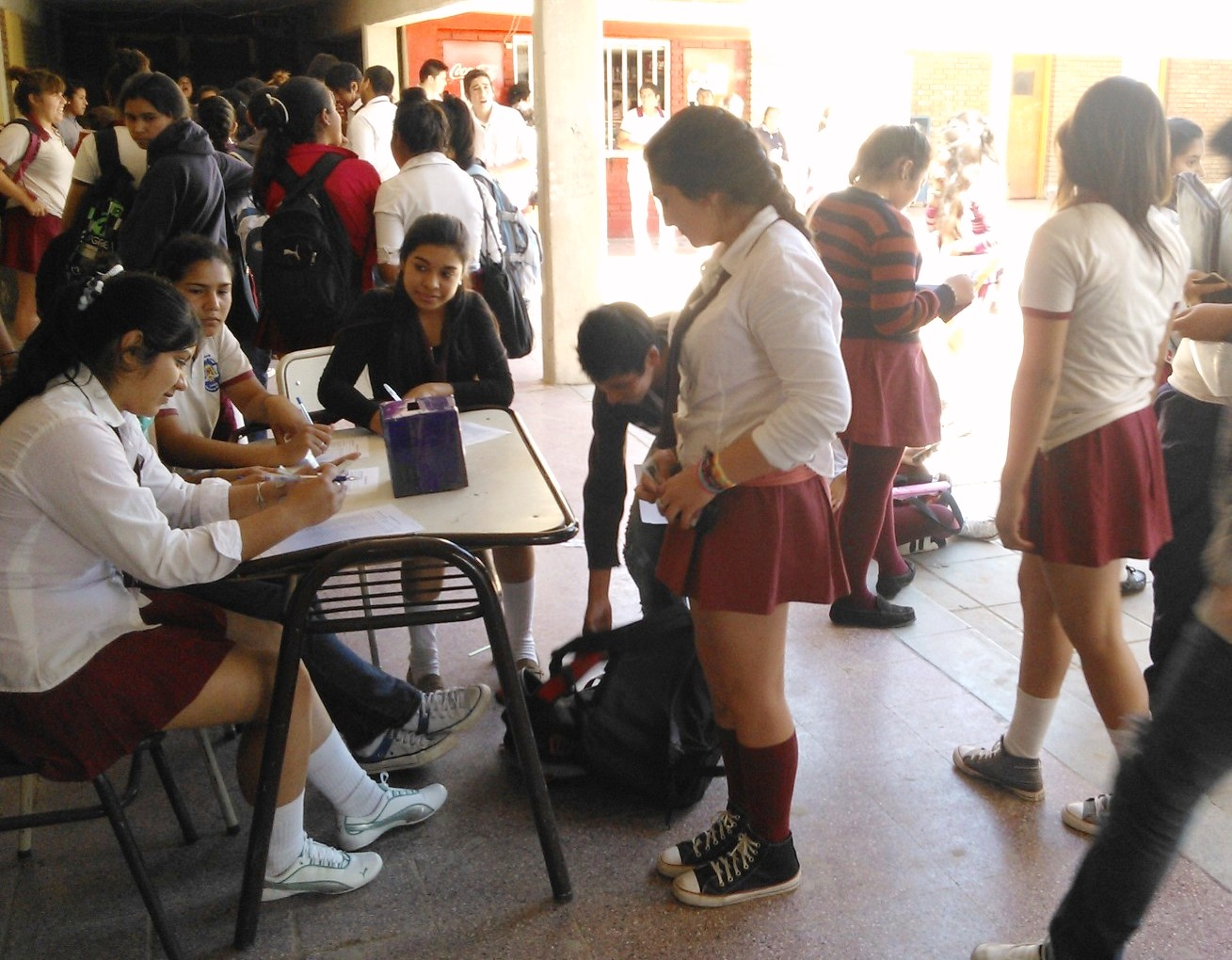
School girls of Argentina

=== Positives ===
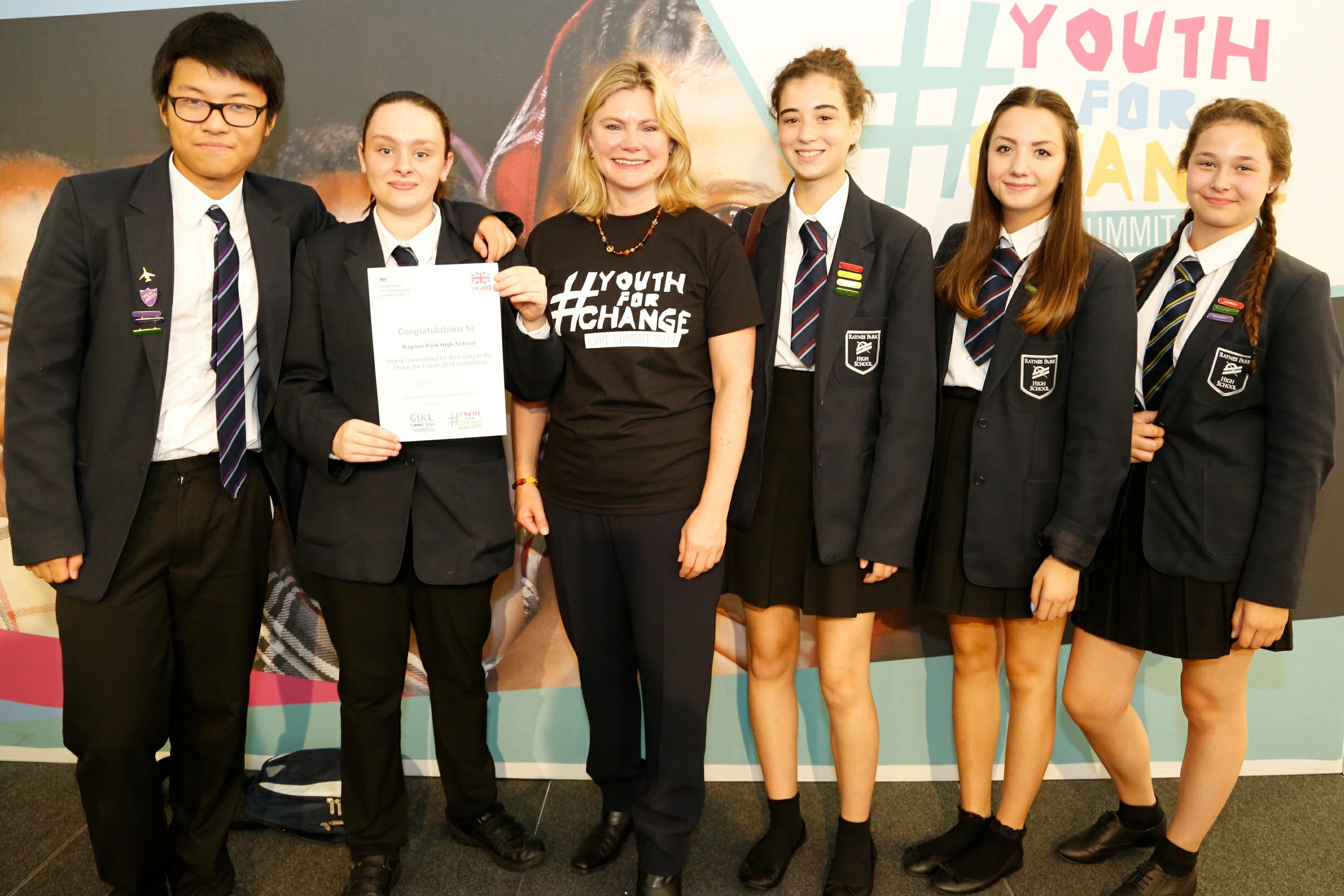
Students in school uniform in the UK

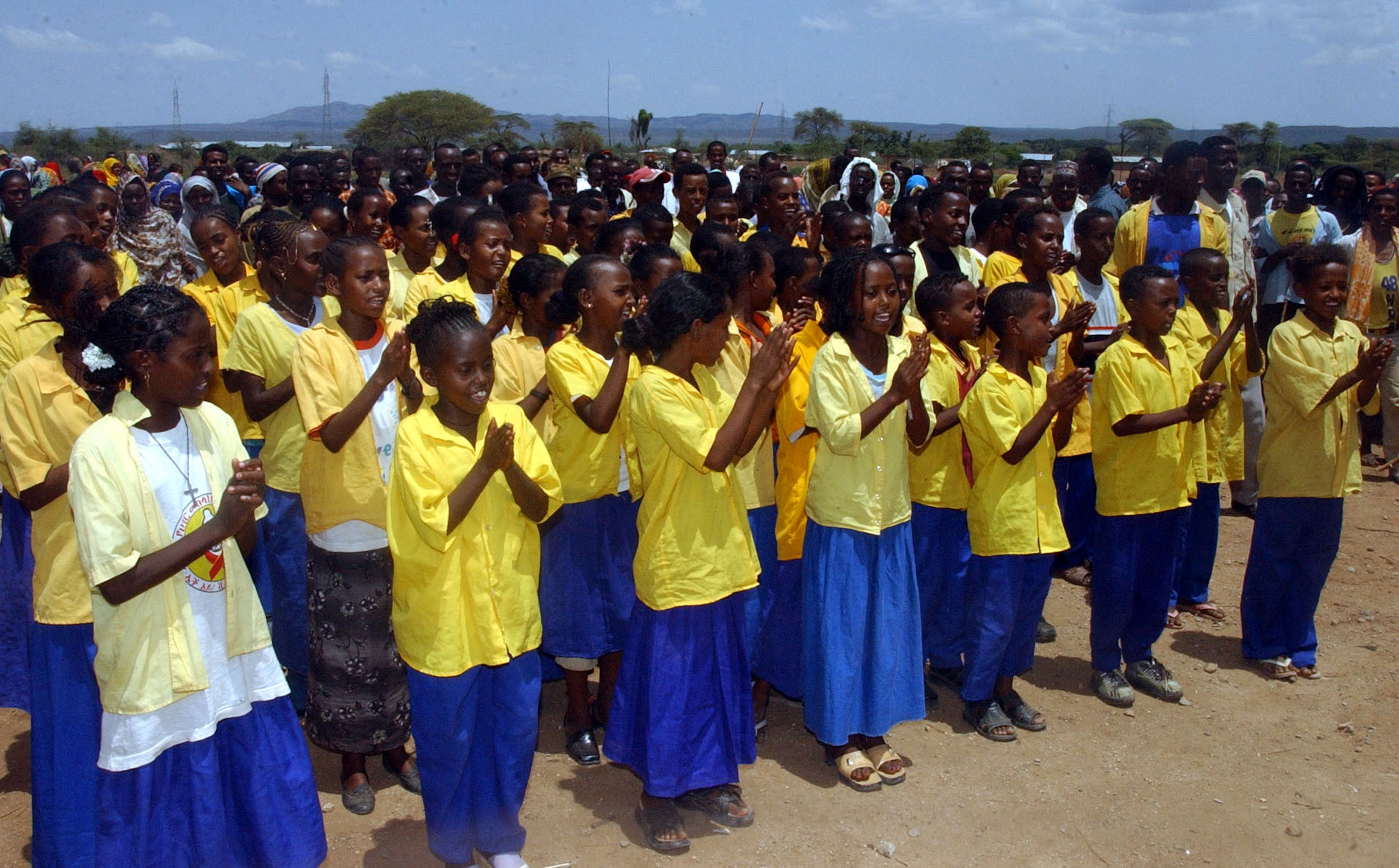
Ethiopian school children

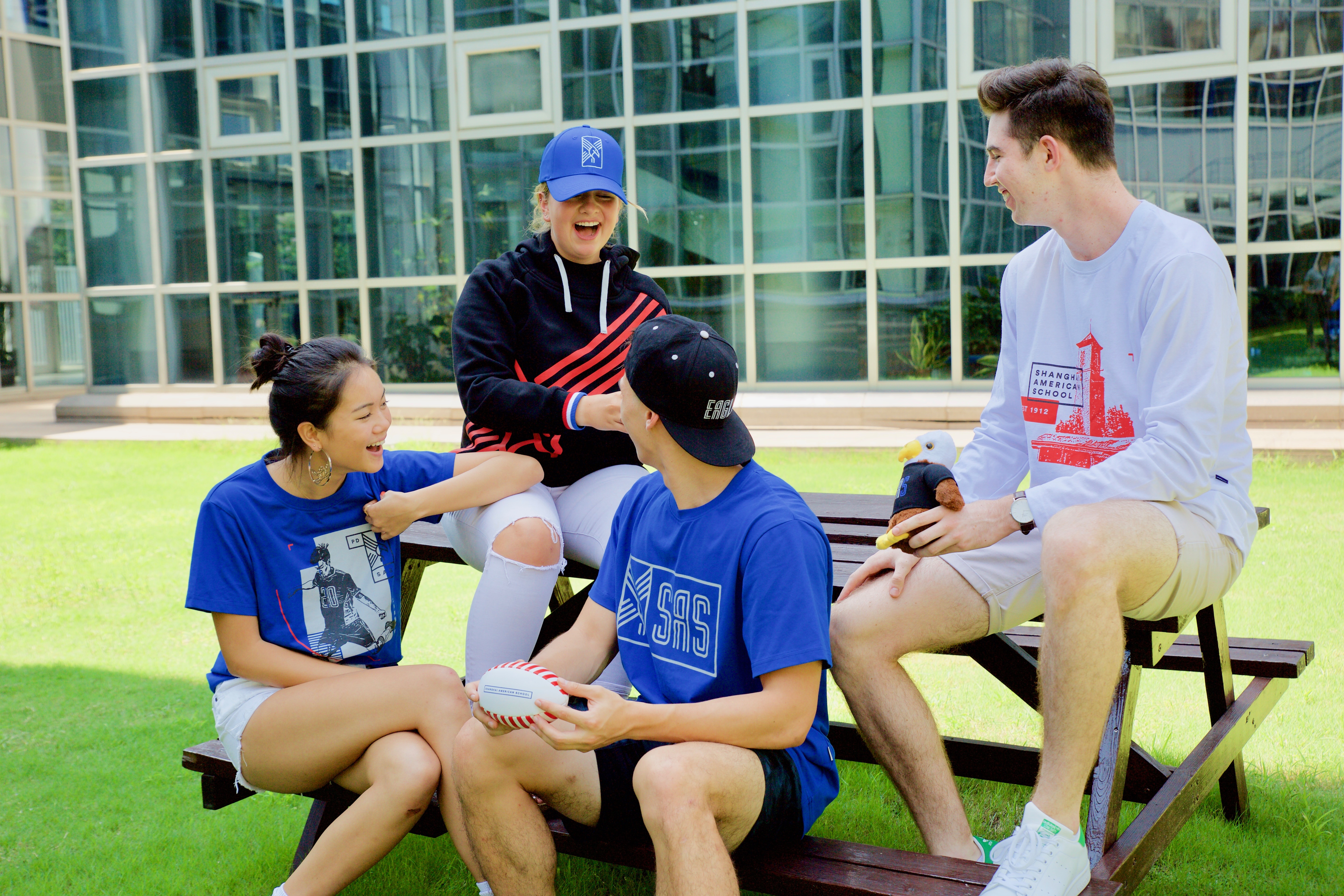
Students of different nationalities at an international school in Shanghai, China, 2017. The school does not have a uniform.

Advocates of uniforms have proposed several reasons supporting their implementation and claiming their success in schools. Advocates believe that uniforms affect student safety by decreasing student victimization, gang activity, and fights. There has been no concrete evidence of this, and studies by Ohio State University and others showed that uniforms did not increase test scores, grades, or focus. However, attendance increased by less than half of a day. The students felt even less of a sense of belonging at a school with uniforms.

Kathleen Wade conducted an experiment to see if bullying and gang presence was higher in uniform or non-uniform schools. The research was done with multiple schools where she gave a questionnaire to both students and faculty to see if there was a significant difference. Her results showed that bullying and gang presence significantly decreases with students wearing school uniforms.

- Differentiating strangers from students in school buildings

For example, in the first year of the mandatory uniform policy in Long Beach, California, officials reported that fighting in schools decreased by more than 50%, assault and battery by 34%, sex offenses by 74%, and robbery by 66%. However the district also added other safety measures like security guards so the success cannot be attributed to the uniforms solely.

Advocates also believe that uniforms increase student learning and positive attitudes toward school through:

- Enhanced learning environments
- Heightened school pride
- Increased student achievement
- High levels of preparedness
- Conformity to organizational goals

Currently, pros of school uniforms center around how uniforms affect school environments. Advocates say that uniforms may create a safe learning environment for students to help them focus on school work and can lead them to great academic accomplishments. Students who wear school uniforms may not feel anxious or nervous about peer pressure in buying new clothes to fit in or being teased by other classmates. Proponents have found a significant positive impact on school climate, safety, and students' self-perception from the implementation of uniforms.

However, though modern studies and tests prove uniforms did not increase test scores, behavior, bullying, focus and attendance barely increased.

=== Negatives ===
Opponents of school uniforms have argued their ineffectiveness using a variety of justifications, many of which have research supporting them. Some of the cons to school uniforms include the following legal, financial, and effectiveness concerns.

The primary concern with school uniforms or strict dress codes is that they may limit the students' freedom of expression and religion. Clothing is viewed as a means of expression – mandating that all students wear the same clothes or limiting what they can wear may disrupt their sense of individuality. Uniforms also necessitate that students cannot wear the latest trends or clothes that, according to schools, may disrupt the learning environment. However, broadly speaking, uniform policies and dress codes usually make exceptions for religious attire. In the U.S., the Constitution and most states protect the students' right to wear religious attire.

Another negative aspect of school uniforms is that the policy can be sexist. Boys and girls are often not disciplined in the same ways. Girls are more commonly disciplined for certain articles of clothing that are prohibited because they "distract" boys. In some cases, transgender students have been sent home for wearing clothing different from what is expected of their legal sex, while others have been excluded from yearbooks.

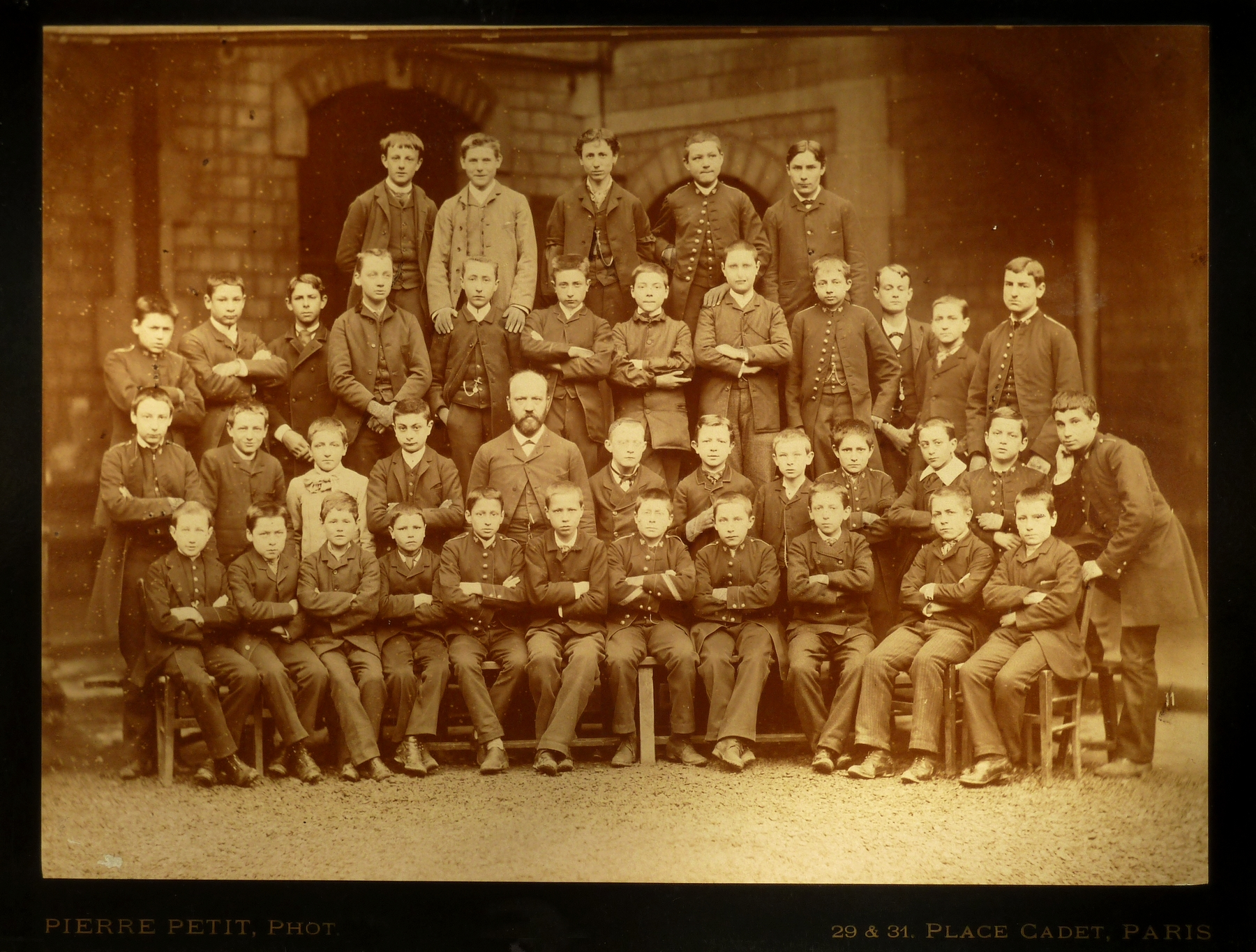
Schoolboys in France, 1880

Uniforms also generally restrict freedom of movement and comfort, especially for girls. In a study conducted at an Australian independent private school, it was found that the uniform for boys, a blazer was too hot/cold and uncomfortable. When playing and moving around, the school tie was a choking hazard, and their trousers could not stretch. For girls, the light coloured cotton school dress was restrictive, see-through, hot, uncomfortable, and impractical. Furthermore, the stockings were often cold, grey woollen kilt was too heavy and restricted movement. In summer, the dress/skirt could also cause modesty issues (e.g. hard to swing on monkey bars/run around while keeping their privacy) and discourage them from being active.

Research on how school uniforms and school dress codes influence the student can be inconclusive. "In the U.S., over half of public schools have a dress code, which frequently outline gender-specific policies."

- Legal concerns
  - Focus on the supposition that requiring a uniform violates children's individual rights (Thomas, 1994; Virginia State Dep't of Edu, 1992)
  - Mandatory uniform policies are being considered largely for urban school districts, and, hence are being forced on a predominantly minority and poor student population (Thomas, 1994)
- No effect on social status
  - Many students felt the school uniform policy had little impact on the social dynamic of the school and students found ways to express individuality by making minor alterations to the school uniform (Da Costa, 2006). Some parents and students interviewed in a research about the social aspect of school uniforms said that uniforms were a violation of their rights and freedom. "Like adults, children's freedom to choose or to act is also circumscribed by the community – massively so by schools, with their high density, constant supervision and evaluation, lack of privacy, and the obligatory nature of their activities." (Bodine, 2003)
- Financial concerns
  - Groups such as the American Civil Liberties Union have voiced concerns about the cost of uniforms, specifically that some disadvantaged parents are unable to afford them (Gursky, 1996)
- Questionable effectiveness of those policies
  - Strongest opponents of uniform policies charge that no empirical evidence exists to support the numerous and varied claims of uniform proponents (LaPorte, Holoman, & Alleyne, 1992)
  - School uniforms suppress students' individuality by mandating standardization of appearance and removing student expression (Joseph, 1986)
  - While uniform policies have been linked to school climate, safety, and student self-perception, there is no evidence to indicate that a uniform policy increases academic achievement (Wade & Stafford, 2003)

Students that do not wear uniforms can be just as successful as students who do wear school uniforms. The amount of effort and participation a student does during class determines their academic success, regardless of what they are wearing. Students who wear school uniforms does not grant them academic achievement.

According to Marian Wilde, additional opponent arguments include that school uniforms:

- Are simply a Band-Aid on the issue of school violence
- Make students a target for bullies from other schools
- Are an unfair additional expense for parents who pay taxes for a free public education
- Are difficult to enforce in state/public (government) schools

== See also ==
- Catholic school uniform
- School uniforms by country
- Schoolbag
- Sumptuary law
- Uniform fetishism
