= Charter schools in North Carolina =

Charter schools in North Carolina are public schools operating under a different set of rules than the typical state-run schools. Though they are exempt from many requirements, charter schools are required to administer state standardized tests.

== History ==
North Carolina Charter schools were established by North Carolina House Bill 955 in 1996, also known as the Charter School Act. Charter schools were established in an effort to improve the academic chances and performance of those that were at-risk and those that were academically gifted, but all students eligible for public school are eligible to apply to a charter school. The Act allowed an organization or person could apply to start a charter school. Approved schools are state-funded but managed by a community board instead of a school board. As of February 2011 there is a state cap of 100 charter schools total, but the new Republican majority in the North Carolina General Assembly has started a movement to lift the cap.

In January, 2011, the National Alliance for Public Charter Schools ranked North Carolina's charter school law 32 out of 41 states with charter school laws, with poor marks for accountability, equity of funding, and the low cap of 100 schools in the state.

In Peltier v. Charter Day School (2022), the United States Court of Appeals for the Fourth Circuit held that a North Carolina charter school was a state actor for purposes of constitutional claims and that its skirts-only requirement for female students violated the Equal Protection Clause and was subject to Title IX.

== Differences between County Schools and Public Charter Schools ==
Charter schools are:

- not required to provide transportation for students, although many do have transportation options
- not required to provide breakfast or lunch for students, although many do provide for students who qualify for free & reduced price lunches
- allowed to serve students from other counties.
- allowed to craft a schedule and calendar that fits the needs of the families and students they serve, apart from the traditional 180-day school calendar.
- allowed to have non-certified teachers.
- allowed to employ teachers on short-term contracts.
