= Center for Community Self-Help =

Community development institution aiming to drive economic development

Self-Help Credit Union

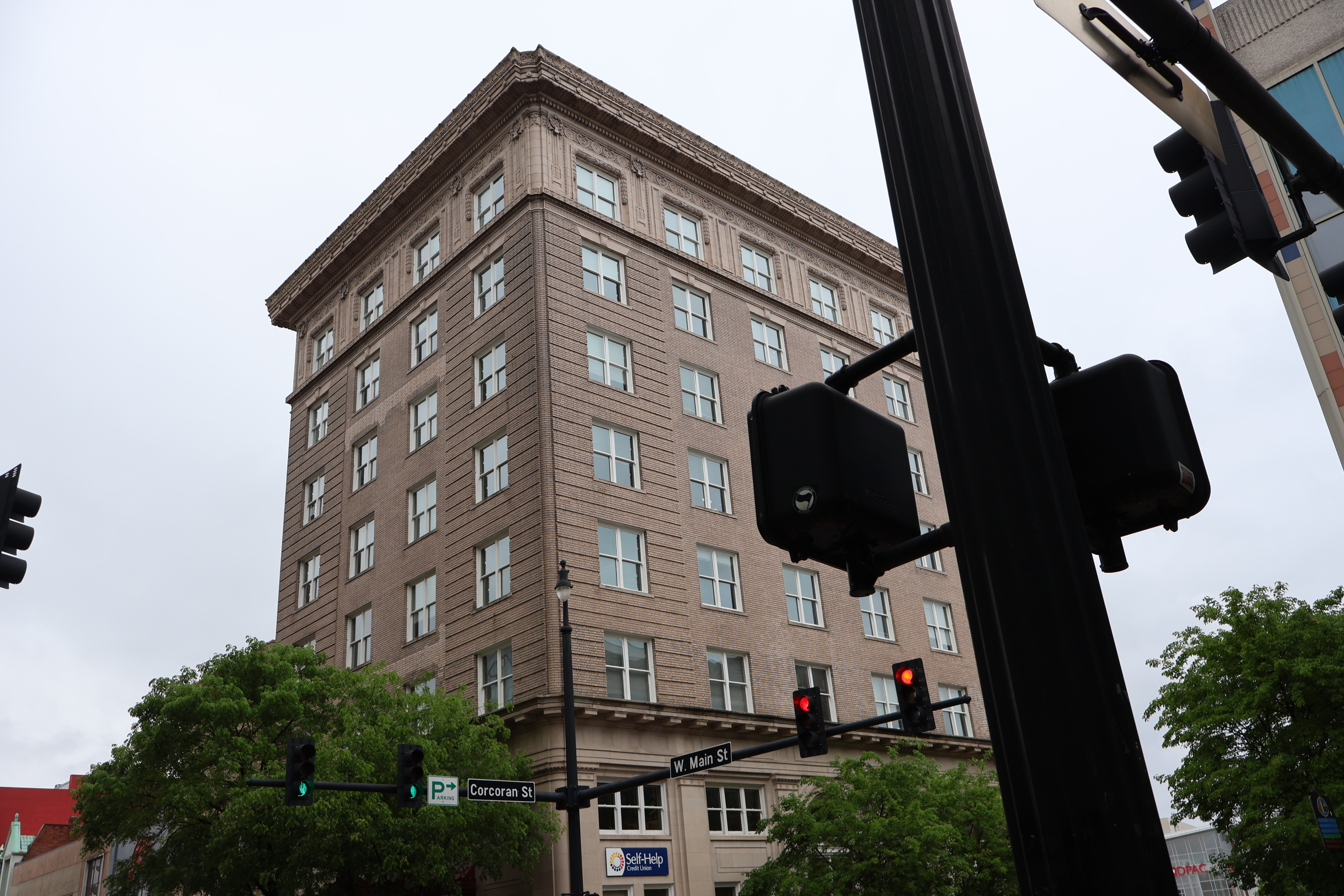
- Type: CDFI
- Founded: 1980
- Headquarters: City View Building; 123 W Main Street; Durham, North Carolina, U.S.
- Key people: Martin Eakes (CEO)
- Products: Financial services Microfinance
- Number of employees: 650+
- Website: self-help.org

Self-Help is a national community development financial institution headquartered in Durham, North Carolina at the City View Building. Between the years of 1980-2017, Self-Help reportedly provided over $7 billion in financing to 146,000 families, individuals and businesses. The organization seeks to support economic development and community stability by offering financial services and loans to individuals, small businesses, and nonprofits. Its activities also include real estate development and the promotion of fair financial practices nationwide. It also aims to develop real estate and promote fair financial practices across the nation. Through its credit union network, Self-Help serves 150,000 members in North Carolina, California, Illinois, South Carolina, Virginia, Wisconsin and Florida.

== Structure ==
The Center for Community Self-Help, itself a 501(c)(3) nonprofit, has five affiliates: Self-Help Credit Union, a 501(c)(14) state-chartered credit union; Self-Help Federal Credit Union, a 501(c)(1); Self-Help Ventures Fund, a 501(c)(3) loan fund managing "larger business loans, real estate development, and home loan secondary market programs," and the Center for Responsible Lending, a nonpartisan 501(c)(3) working to protect consumers from predatory lending practices.

Self-Help Credit Union, Self-Help FCU, and Self-Help Ventures Fund are also certified community development financial institutions (CDFIs), an idea that traces its origins back to a Self-Help conference in the early 1990s.

=== Work environment ===
Self-Help operated without a formal human resources department until approximately 2000. The organization is known for low salaries, capping the top salary at three times that of the lowest-paid employee. Its offices are also known for strong energy conservation measures. Worker-member councils operate in North Carolina and Self-Help FCU. In 2010, when Self-Help experienced its first loss, it closed three branches and laid off 30 employees.

Self-Help has been described as having a free-spirited, innovative and hands-on culture for adaptation to change and evaluation of new ideas. Employing a double bottom line, Self-Help evaluates new ideas first for alignment with its mission of closing the wealth gap and second for profitability.

== History ==
The Center for Community Self-Help was co-founded on February 4, 1980 by Martin Eakes and Barbara (Bonnie) Wright. In 1982, a grant from the Mary Reynolds Babcock Foundation allowed the organization to hire its first employee, Thad Day Moore, who went on to stay with the organization for 30 years. Self-Help Credit Union, an idea developed by Bonnie Wright during her graduate studies at Yale, was chartered by North Carolina in September 1983, approved by the National Credit Union Administration in December, and opened for business March 31, 1984. The Self-Help Ventures Fund was created at the same time.

In its early years, the Center focused on promoting worker ownership, especially as a potential solution for the factory closures taking place then in North Carolina. They held conferences on worker ownership at Guilford College, but struggled to gain momentum around worker-owned business models. Perhaps their greatest success was Nantahala Outdoor Center, which became worker-owned in 1990 with the assistance of a Self-Help subsidiary, Englewood Investment Corporation.

In 1985, Self-Help began making home loans to North Carolina families unable to secure conventional mortgages. Looking to expand its community development impact, Self-Help worked with Fannie Mae to create more home-buying opportunities for underserved borrowers in the late 1980s. Later, Self-Help partnered with Fannie Mae and the Ford Foundation in 1998 to create the Community Advantage Program which provides credit enhancement to conventional lenders. The Community Advantage Program reportedly awarded over $2 billion in affordable home mortgage loans to minority and low-wealth homebuyers nationwide over a five-year period. After analyzing the data from this program, Self-Help determined that low-income borrowers are good credit risks when they are offered responsible loans at fair rates.

In the late 1990s, homeowners began coming to Self-Help Credit Union seeking help to avoid foreclosure after unscrupulous subprime lenders had siphoned off their home equity. In response to predatory loans, Self-Help worked with a state coalition in 1999 to help pass the North Carolina Predatory Lending Law, the first such law in the country.

Around the turn of the century, Self-Help played an active role in the North Carolina Coalition for the Public Trust's opposition to health insurer NC Blue's planned conversion from non-profit to for-profit, which was withdrawn in 2002.

In 2002, Self-Help established the Center for Responsible Lending (CRL) to build on initial successes and expand our focus nationally, and to tackle practices such as payday lending in addition to mortgage lending. Since 2002, CRL has worked with community advocates, policymakers and industry groups to fight against outrageous lending abuses that strip billions of dollars from American families.

In 2008, the creation of Self-Help Federal Credit Union (FCU) started a period of expansion beyond North Carolina.

In 2014, Self-Help Credit Union partnered with fashion designer Tory Burch's Elizabeth Street Capital to administer microloans to women entrepreneurs in North and South Carolina.

=== Expansion ===
Restored Public Service Building in Asheville, North Carolina, with Self-Help signage visible on the side and front.

In the early 1990s, Self-Help purchased and renovated the Public Service Building in Asheville, North Carolina. In September 1992, Self-Help opened a location there and rented additional space to nonprofits.

Between 2004 and 2006, Self-Help Credit Union acquired four credit unions in North Carolina: Firestone CU, Scotland Community CU, Cape Fear FCU, and Wilson ECU.

In 2008, the NCUA granted a charter to Self-Help Federal Credit Union (FCU), allowing the organization to expand beyond North Carolina. In California, Self-Help FCU has operated 9 branches as Community Trust CU and one, in Oakland, as People's CU. Especially in the years following the Great Recession, Self-Help's credit union network has expanded through mergers. In 2010, Choice FCU in Greensboro, North Carolina, and California's El Futuro credit union merged into Self-Help. That same year, the Center used secondary capital to form a community development credit union (CDCU) in California made up of People's Community CU in Oakland, Community Trust CU in Modesto, El Futuro CU in Porterville and Kern Central CU in Bakersfield.

A Self-Help Federal Credit Union Branch in Tallahassee, Florida displaying the new logo.

In an innovative arrangement, Self-Help FCU acquired Second Federal Savings & Loan in 2012 and, in partnership with the Resurrection Project, acquired its mortgages, deposits, and three branches. It reopened as Second FCU, continuing to serve a low-income, primarily Latino, neighborhood in Chicago. Also in Chicago, Self-Help acquired Black-owned Seaway Bank & Trust's nine branches and $200 million in deposits in 2017.

The 2014 merger with Generations Community Credit Union in Durham brought Self-Help FCU's retail banking practices to North Carolina.

In 2016, Self-Help FCU entered the Florida market with the acquisition of Community Trust FCU in Apopka. This acquistion was expected to refocus Self-Help's activities on Black communities in the southeastern U.S.

== Community development ==
Throughout its history, Self-Help's lending has played a significant role in community development projects. Early projects included Crest Street in Durham, repurposing the former Mercy Hospital in Wilson to a community center and business incubator, and an affordable housing partnership with Duke University and the City of Durham the Walltown neighborhood.

In 2002, Self-Help financed a $40 million deal by local media executive Jim Goodmon to restore Durham's American Tobacco Campus. This deal was one of the first applications of the New Markets Tax Credit.

Revolution Mill in Greensboro, NC in 2015, while the site was being renovated by Self-Help.

In 2012, Self-Help purchased and began a $100 million renovation of Revolution Mill in Greensboro. The repurposed cotton mill began accepting tenants in 2016.

Lending to non-profit charter schools aligned with its mission has also been a significant lending for Self-Help. Its was involved in financing for about one third of the 100 charters authorized by North Carolina in 1996. It then expanded its charter school lending to Atlanta, Columbus, Detroit, Nashville, and Washington, DC. Charter school lending was controversial within the organization because many employees were strong supporters of public schools.

Self-Help Ventures Fund is partnering with St. Augustine's University in Raleigh to help the school find a path from bankruptcy to financial sustainability.

== Awards ==
Over the years Self-Help has received numerous awards for its work from organizations such as Preservation North Carolina, the North Carolina Department of Commerce, and the Triangle Commercial Real Estate Women.

In 2007, Self-Help was named one of the twelve high-impact nonprofits in the book Forces For Good along with other organizations such as America's Second Harvest, Habitat for Humanity, The Heritage Foundation, and Teach for America.

In 2009, Self-Help received the Dora Maxwell Social Responsibility Award, which recognizes credit unions for their community service efforts. That same year, AARP honored Martin Eakes, co-founder and CEO of Self-Help, with an Inspire Award for his contributions to social improvement. Other recipients included Glenn Close, Quincy Jones, and Alma Powell.

In 2011, the Ford Foundation named Eakes one of twelve Social Change Visionaries in celebration of its 75th anniversary. Each honoree received a $100,000 award. The foundation described Eakes as a national leader in combating predatory financial practices affecting low-income communities.

== Controversies ==
In 2015, Self-Help Credit Union and Self-Help Federal Credit Union left their state credit union leagues and the Credit Union National Association, motivated by disagreements about consumer protection policy.

In 2024, Self-Help Ventures Fund, an affiliate of Self-Help Credit Union, was named one of three primary partners in the Climate United Fund, which received a $6.97 billion grant from the U.S. Environmental Protection Agency under the National Clean Investment Fund of the Greenhouse Gas Reduction Fund. The award faced criticism from EPA Administrator Lee Zeldin, who described the selection process as rushed and lacking transparency. Following the grant, a Freedom of Information Act request was filed concerning communications between the CDFI Fund and Self-Help affiliates, after it was revealed that a senior CDFI Fund official had previously worked for Self-Help Ventures Fund. Republican lawmakers also raised concerns about potential ethical conflicts and favoritism in the grant’s administration. The EPA is appealing to the Supreme Court to claw back the grant money after two federal courts failed to find it jusitified.

In December, 2025, Self-Help Credit Union sued Fiserv, seeking to avoid millions of dollars in early termination fees and alleging that Fiserv's security systems for client data were inadequate.
