= Climate United =

US nonprofit organization

- Established: 2023; 3 years ago
- Type: Nonprofit
- Headquarters: Bethesda, Maryland
- CEO: Beth Bafford
- Affiliations: Calvert Impact
- Website: https://www.climateunited.org

EPA Administrator Michael S. Regan in Charlotte, North Carolina at April 2024 announcement of $20 billion for Greenhouse Gas Reduction Fund grants.

The Climate United Fund is a nonprofit organization which focuses on environmentally sustainable economically oriented projects in low-income communities. It is a partnership between Calvert Impact Capital, the Community Preservation Corp of the Community Development Financial Institutions Fund, and Center for Community Self-Help.

In 2024, it was awarded $6.97 billion to finance community-based climate change oriented projects. The funds were awarded by the Environmental Protection Agency (EPA) as part of the $20 billion Greenhouse Gas Reduction Fund, part of the Inflation Reduction Act(IRA). On January 20, 2025 (Inauguration Day), President Trump issued Executive Order 14154, "Unleashing American Energy," which revoked implementation of the IRA's energy and infrastructure provisions. In February 2025, EPA Administrator Lee Zeldin announced plans to claw back the funds held by Citibank in the name of the grantees, including Climate United. In March 2025, Climate United sued the EPA and Citibank claiming the funds awarded to the group in 2024 are being illegally withheld. The following month, the U.S. District Court for the District of Columbia blocked the attempt to revoke $14 billion of the funds, including those awarded to Climate United. The decision was upheld on appeal in August, 2026. The EPA has appealed the decision to the Supreme Court, still seeking to claw back the funds based on claims of waste, fraud and abuse, although the agency has not demonstrated that in court.

In November 2024, the organization announced a $30 million fund called Climate United NEXT, offering grants up to $300,000 over the next five years for renewable energy projects in low-income, rural, and tribal communities.

In December 2024, the organization announced a $250 million partnership with Forum Mobility to purchase up to 500 zero-emissions electric drayage trucks for use at the Ports of Long Beach and Los Angeles.
