= Peltier v. Charter Day School =

2022 U.S. charter school court case

- Court: United States Court of Appeals for the Fourth Circuit
- Full case name: Bonnie Peltier, as guardian of A.P., a minor child; Erika Booth, as guardian of I.B., a minor child; and Keely Burks v. Charter Day School, Inc., et al.
- Decided: June 14, 2022
- Citation: 37 F.4th 104

Case history
- Prior actions: 384 F. Supp. 3d 579 (E.D.N.C. 2019); 9 F.4th 251 (4th Cir. 2021)
- Subsequent action: U.S. Supreme Court denied certiorari (June 26, 2023)

Court membership
- Judges sitting: Barbara Milano Keenan (en banc majority), J. Harvie Wilkinson III (en banc dissent), others

Case opinions
- Charter school dress code requiring girls to wear skirts violated the Equal Protection Clause; Title IX applies to sex-based dress codes

Keywords
- Charter schools; Equal Protection Clause; Gender discrimination; Public education; School uniform; Sex discrimination; Title IX

Peltier v. Charter Day School, Inc. is a decision of the United States Court of Appeals for the Fourth Circuit concerning a North Carolina public charter school's requirement that female students wear skirts. In a 2022 en banc opinion, the court held that the school's dress code violated the Equal Protection Clause of the Fourteenth Amendment and that Title IX applies to sex-based school dress codes. The court also held that North Carolina charter schools are state actors for purposes of constitutional claims.

The Supreme Court of the United States later denied certiorari, leaving the Fourth Circuit's decision in place. The case has been discussed in legal scholarship on charter schools, state action doctrine, and Title IX.

== Background ==
Charter Day School is a public charter school in Leland, North Carolina, operated by a private non-profit corporation under a charter granted by the state. Under the school's uniform policy, girls were required to wear skirts, skorts, or jumpers, while boys were permitted to wear pants or shorts. The school's founder stated that the policy was intended in part to promote "chivalry" and traditional views about gender roles.

In 2016, several students and their parents, including lead plaintiff Bonnie Peltier, filed suit in federal district court. They alleged that the dress code discriminated against girls and reinforced gender stereotypes, and brought claims under the Equal Protection Clause and Title IX. The American Civil Liberties Union and private counsel represented the plaintiffs.

== District court ==
In 2019, the United States District Court for the Eastern District of North Carolina held that Charter Day School was a state actor because it provided free, public education under state authority. The court concluded that the skirts requirement violated the Equal Protection Clause, but it rejected the plaintiffs' Title IX claim on the ground that the statute did not cover school dress codes.

Both sides appealed to the Fourth Circuit.

== Court of Appeals ==
=== Panel decision ===
A divided Fourth Circuit panel issued its decision in 2021. The panel majority held that Charter Day School was not a state actor for purposes of the Equal Protection Clause and vacated the district court's judgment on that claim. The panel also held that Title IX is not categorically inapplicable to school dress codes and remanded the Title IX claim for further proceedings.

Judge Barbara Milano Keenan dissented in part. She argued that under North Carolina law the charter school was performing a public function and was therefore subject to constitutional constraints.

=== En banc rehearing ===
The Fourth Circuit granted rehearing en banc. On June 14, 2022, the en banc court affirmed in part and reversed in part. Writing for the majority, Judge Keenan concluded that Charter Day School was a state actor because it provided tuition-free, compulsory basic education under a state charter and was treated by North Carolina law as part of the public school system.

On the merits, the court held that the skirts requirement violated the Equal Protection Clause because it imposed unequal burdens on female students and rested on gender stereotypes about the proper behavior of girls and boys. The court further held that Title IX's prohibition of sex discrimination in education extends to sex-based dress codes imposed by covered schools.

Six judges dissented from the en banc decision. Among other concerns, the dissenters argued that the majority's approach to state action could limit charter school autonomy and depart from earlier decisions of other federal courts of appeals on the status of charter schools.

== Supreme Court ==
Charter Day School petitioned for a writ of certiorari, asking the Supreme Court to review the Fourth Circuit's decision. The petition argued that the decision conflicted with other circuits' treatment of charter schools and that the case presented questions about whether charter schools are public or private actors.

The Court invited the Solicitor General to express the views of the United States. The Solicitor General recommended denial of certiorari, noting that North Carolina law expressly treats charter schools as public schools and that the case might not be an ideal vehicle for resolving broader questions about charter schools in other states.

On June 26, 2023, the Supreme Court denied certiorari. Press coverage noted that the denial left unresolved broader national debates over whether charter schools are to be treated as public or private actors for constitutional purposes.

== Scholarly commentary and influence ==
Legal scholars have used Peltier v. Charter Day School as a case study in the application of state action doctrine to publicly funded but privately managed schools. A recent development in the North Carolina Law Review analyzes the decision's reasoning on state action and considers its implications for future suits under 42 U.S.C. § 1983 against charter management organizations and other education providers. Earlier commentary in the same journal discussed the status of charter schools and education management organizations in sovereign immunity law and has been cited in connection with the issues raised in Peltier.

The decision has also been discussed in scholarship on charter schools and religion. Articles in the Notre Dame Law Review and Duke Law Journal on the possibility of religious charter schools and the scope of Title IX refer to Peltier when describing how courts have treated charter schools as public actors and how sex-discrimination rules may apply to them. These works situate the case within broader debates over whether charter schools should be treated as equivalent to traditional public schools for purposes of constitutional and civil-rights protections.

Commentary from legal academics and policy analysts has noted that the Fourth Circuit's state-action analysis in Peltier may be relevant to disputes in other states that have different statutory frameworks for charter schools, and that the court's reading of Title IX could influence future litigation over student dress codes and other sex-based school policies.
