= Tech Support Comedy =

Web-based community

Tech Support Comedy (defunct)
- TSC front page as viewed in Mozilla Firefox 2.0 in Microsoft Windows XP
- Website type: Humor, Message Boards, Online virtual community
- Owner: Hawk
- Creator: Hawk
- Website: techcomedy.com
- Commercial: No

Tech Support Comedy, or TSC, was a website dedicated to frustrated tech support workers from all over the world and the customers they deal with constantly. It was created by member Hawk, an ex-Tech Support worker, in March 2000, originally as a web comic, but quickly grew into a bulletin board for reader submissions, and soon added the ability for members to comment on the submissions. Since then, the site has grown in both membership and content daily, with over 9,000 members and more than 60,000 story submissions.

The site was closed after a DDOS attack in April 2015.

Submissions to TSC included Tech Stories, Customer Misconceptions, Tech Support Rules, Customer Types, Co-worker Types, Customer E-mails, End User Phrase of the Day (or "EUPOTD"), Tech Songs, Cool Links, SoapBox, and finally Tech Calls, where actual calls to tech support can be heard. Also, an IRC chatroom exists: channel #TSC on the Nightstar IRC network. Membership in the IRC channel is open to all; it is not restricted to members of the site.

Access to most TSC content was unrestricted. Everyone might view it, but only members could add comments, or submit content. What you could submit, and how you could submit it was determined by your level of membership, which was separated into two levels. These levels were "Regular Membership" (a free membership), and "Star Membership" (given to members who have made a monetary donation to the site). While all members could post stories, tech support rules, customer misconceptions, customer and co-worker types, e-mails, EUPOTD's (End User Phrase of the Day), and cool links (see below for further details on each type) only Star Members could use HTML formatting when doing so. Star members also gained the ability to post Tech Songs, full access to the complete archive of Tech Calls and ability to post to the SoapBox, a specific area on the main page that everyone could see.

== Star members ==
Star Members used to have special privileges:

- Ability to
  - Post to the SoapBox
  - Post Tech Songs
  - Post a Cool Link of the Day
  - Include a signature in each post
  - Use HTML code in posts
- Access to
  - Full Tech Calls archive

Also, Star Members' nicknames were preceded by a small yellow star icon.

One-year Star Memberships were granted to members who gave a monetary donation to the site. These donations helped to maintain the site. After a year has passed, a Star Member reverted to a Regular Membership. There were two levels of Star Memberships:

- US$20
  - Included all Star Member benefits
- US$35
  - Included all Star Member benefits
  - Included most recent TSC Star Member T-shirt

However, the T-shirt option has been suspended.

== Privacy on TSC ==
Privacy was taken quite seriously on TSC. Whenever members submitted anything to the site, they made it a point to alter or obliterate any names, e-mail addresses or other identifying information on the post to something generic. This was done to guard the privacy of all concerned. For example, members often changed their own names to their usernames in posted conversations, replaced the name of other parties to starfish, FNG, EU or some other amusing (but generic) name, altered any e-mail addresses and/or phone numbers to something that deliberately led nowhere, or simply blacked it out or obscured it. Place of employment was purposefully omitted or otherwise altered into something very basic and unidentifiable, since employers have traditionally frowned upon any discussion of internal events, and doing so could potentially result in the member being disciplined, including the possibility of being suspended or terminated from their job, should the company discover and identify the member making the post.

== Karma requests ==
Occasionally, a member may be going through difficulties in their life or job in one form or another, they may have a pending interview for a big promotion at their job (or for a new, better paying job), or may just need a positive boost in their lives, so they would put in a karma request. These requests provide a show of support and solidarity for fellow members, since at other times, that same member may have symbolically given karma to another member in a previous karma request. Often, each member has their own unique way of providing karma, and can also provide any advice or assistance as requested/needed. Not only does it show the aforementioned support amongst the community, but it can also helped serve to cheer up the member who posted the request, since the karma delivery can often be done in a very humorous way. Traditionally, after the trouble passes or the tech receives the promotion they interviewed for, the member makes a follow-up post, thanks all who helped, and symbolically returned any unused karma to the pool.

== DDOS attack ==
In April 2015, Tech Support Comedy suffered a DDOS attack, and as such, the site was temporarily taken down so that Hawk could fix issues caused by the attack.

As of August 2015, the site returns only a blank page with the embedded HTML comment "Silence Is Golden". As of August 2019, the site has never recovered from this attack and is defunct.

TSC member skippytpodar created a website called "Not My Circus, Not My Monkeys" in the interim (Link), and offered any TSC members the chance to post content, as well as setting up a forum, similar to TSC's.
