= Taiwan Semiconductor Company Limited =

Taiwanese semiconductor company

Taiwan Semiconductor Co., Ltd.
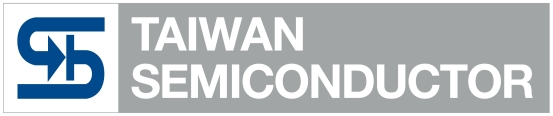

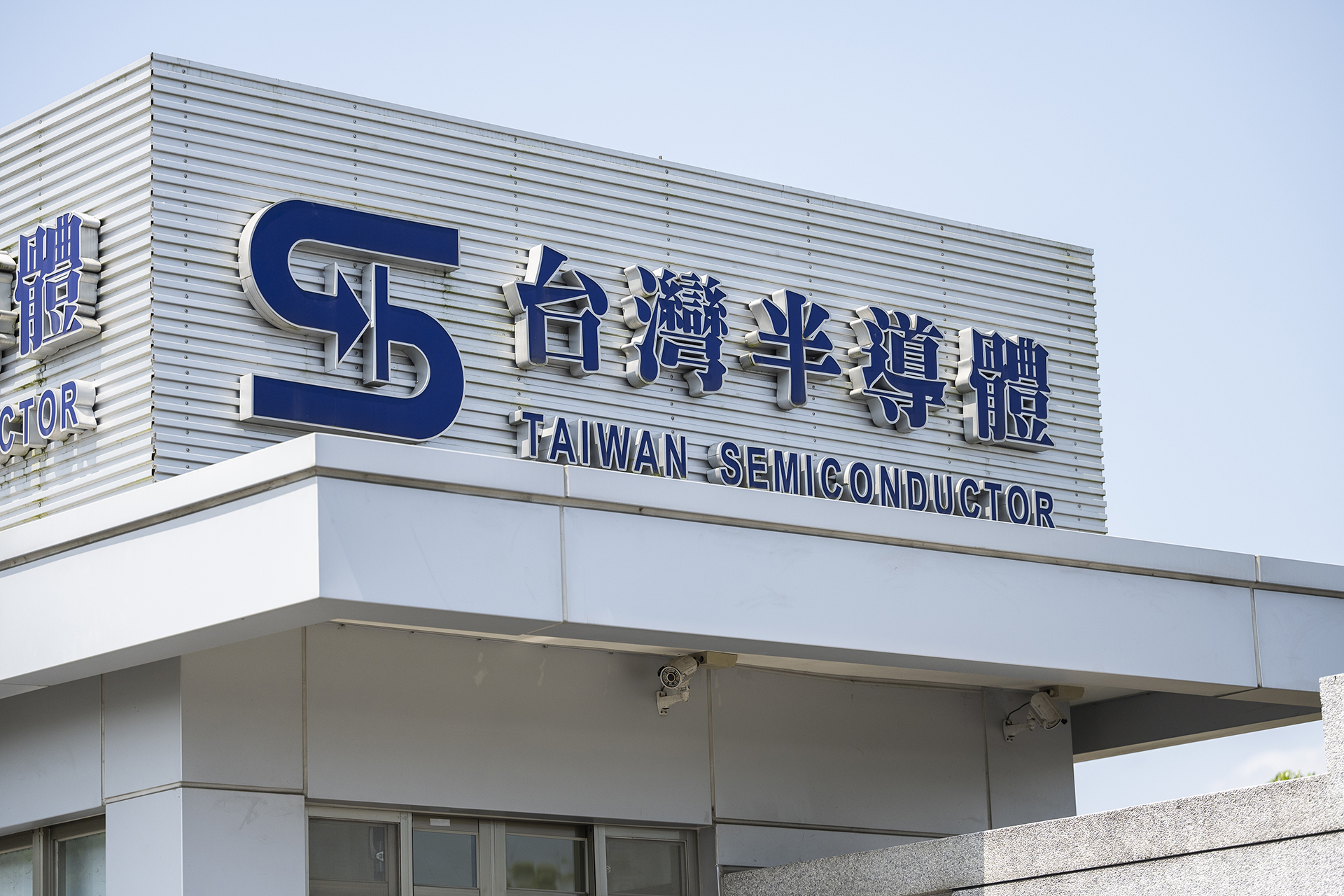
- Taiwan Semiconductor Yilan Plant entry sign
- Trade name: 台半
- Native name: 台灣半導體
- Type: Public
- Traded as: TPEx: 5425
- Industry: Semiconductor Foundry
- Founded: 1979; 47 years ago
- Founder: Arthur Wang
- Headquarters: New Taipei City, Taiwan
- Products: Diodes; IC; MOSFET; Rectifiers; TVS; Schottky
- Revenue: NT$13.1 billion(2021).
- Owner: Arthur Wang
- Number of employees: ▲1,632 (2021)
- Subsidiaries: TSC Auto ID Technology Co., Ltd.

Chinese name
- Traditional Chinese: 台灣半導體股份有限公司
Transcriptions
Standard Mandarin
- Hanyu Pinyin: Táiwān Bàndǎotǐ Gǔfèn Yǒuxiàn Gōngsī
- Bopomofo: ㄊㄞˊ ㄨㄢ ㄅㄢˋ ㄉㄠˇ ㄊㄧˇ。ㄍㄨˇ ㄈㄣˋ。ㄧㄡˇ ㄒㄧㄢˋ。ㄍㄨㄥ。ㄙ
- Wade–Giles: T'ai^{2}-wan^{1} Pan^{4}Tao^{3} T'i^{3}Ku^{3}-fen^{4} You^{3}-hsien^{4}Kung^{1}-ssŭ^{1}

Abbreviation
- Traditional Chinese: 台半
Transcriptions
Standard Mandarin
- Hanyu Pinyin: Tái Bàn
- Wade–Giles: T'ai^{2} Pan^{4}
- Website: www.taiwansemi.com

Taiwan Semiconductor Company Limited (TSC or Taiwan Semi; Chinese: 台灣半導體股份有限公司; pinyin: Táiwān Bàndǎotǐ Gǔfèn Yǒuxiàn Gōngsī) is a Taiwanese semiconductor and electronic components manufacturer for various industries including automotive, communications, power electronics, and consumer goods. Taiwan Semiconductor is headquartered in the Xindian District of New Taipei City, Taiwan. Additionally, the company maintains service centers in China, the United States, Germany, and Japan. The company's subsidiary, TSC Auto ID Technology Co., Ltd., specializes in the manufacturing of barcode printers and wireless RFID barcode printers.

Taiwan Semiconductor operates two wafer fabrication facilities and two packaging facilities, located in Yilan and Lije (Wujie Township), Taiwan, as well as Tianjin and Shandong, China. The Lije facility primarily focuses on the production of TVS components and 6-inch wafers. Meanwhile, while the Tianjin facility specializes in 4-inch wafers and surface-mount adhesive products. The Shandong plant is dedicated to the production of bridge rectifiers and holds certifications such as IATF 16949 for automotive industry quality, ISO 9001, and ISO 14001 for environmental compliance.

Taiwan Semiconductor transitioned from an early focus on the manufacturer of rectifiers and label printers to specializing in electronic components used across diverse industries including automotive, industrial instruments, 5G – 6G communications, power electronics, LED lighting and consumer goods. The company offers a range of products, including trench Schottky rectifiers, MOSFETs, TVS devices, transistors, analog ICs, and ESD protection devices. Taiwan Semiconductor has also collaborated with United Microelectronics Corporation (UMC) on MOSFET technologies, and with Bosch on the development of automotive protection devices, with a specific focus on bolstering capabilities in the automotive sector.

== History ==
Taiwan Semiconductor was established in January 1979 by Arthur Wang. Initially headquartered in Tucheng Township, Taipei County (now Tucheng District), the company focused on rectifier product manufacturing. In 1987, the Yilan Plant was established in Yilan County, significantly increasing rectifier production. By 1991, the company had automated its operations and ventured into the mass production of semiconductor products, including TVS and bridge rectifiers. In 1991, the company invested in Eltron Corporation in the United States, resulting in the production of thermal transfer and thermal direct barcode printers.

To meet the rising need for electronic components in China, TSC established Yangxin Everwell Electronic Co., Ltd. in Shandong (April 1995), followed by the establishment of Tianjin Everwell Technology Co., Ltd. in Tianjin (August 1996). In December 1999, Taiwan Semiconductor applied for listing on the over-the-counter (OTC) market, On February 21, 2000, the company's shares were officially listed on the Taiwan Stock Exchange at a price of NT$22 per share.

The injected capital facilitated the expansion of automation production equipment and the development and trial production of barcode printers and Schottky diodes. The Yilan plant established a Schottky diode chip production line in 2002. As part of a shift towards rectifier diodes, Taiwan Semiconductor initiated an investment leading to the establishment of TSC Auto ID Technology Co., Ltd. in 2007. In August of the same year, the barcode printer business unit transitioned to TSC Auto ID Technology, specializing in barcode printer development and production. From 2011 to 2013 the company implemented the diode trench process and the maturation of the Super Junction to increase capacity in the fields of automotive, lighting, and industrial equipment through automated packaging.

In 2016, Taiwan Semiconductor acquired the TVS product line from American company Onsemi in a transaction valued at $7.1 million. This acquisition aimed to enhance the company's position within the global automotive and industrial control markets. As of September 2022, Taiwan Semiconductor released its Q3 financial report, with consolidated quarterly revenue reaching NTD3.9 billion. The cumulative revenue for the first three quarters of 2022 totaled NTD11.6 billion, accompanied by a post-tax earnings per share of NTD5.03.
