= Martin Daniel Eakes =

American businessman

- Born: Greensboro, North Carolina
- Education: Graduated from Davidson College; J.D. from Yale Law School; M.P.P. from Princeton University
- Occupations: Economic development strategist and credit union CEO
- Title: co-founder of the Center for Community Self-Help in Durham
- Spouse: Barbara Marie Wright
- Children: Justin and Carlyn

Martin Daniel Eakes is an American economic development strategist, and credit union CEO.

Eakes grew up in Greensboro, North Carolina and graduated from Davidson College, where he majored in physics and philosophy, and holds a J.D. from Yale Law School and an M.P.P. from the Woodrow Wilson School of Public and International Affairs at Princeton University.

In 1980, he co-founded the Center for Community Self-Help in Durham. Self-Help provides consumer financial services technical support and advocacy for those left out of the economic mainstream. The nonprofit is headquartered in Durham, North Carolina and has offices in South Carolina, Florida, Washington, D.C., California, Illinois and Wisconsin.

In 1998, he helped form the Center for Responsible Lending (CRL). Through the CRL, Eakes has advocated for fair lending practices and sound economic policies.

== Boards ==
Eakes is a Trustee of the Ford Foundation and a member of its Education, Creativity and Free Expression Committee. Eakes is a Trustee of Guilford College in Greensboro, North Carolina. He also serves on its national Board of Advisors for the Center for Principled Problem Solving.

== Personal ==
He is married to Barbara Marie (Bonnie) Wright; they have two children, Justin and Carlyn.

== Awards ==
- 1996 MacArthur Fellows Program
- 2005 Tar Heel of the Year Award
- 2009 Ned Gramlich Lifetime Achievement Award for Responsible Lending
- 2009 AARP Inspire Awards Honoree
- 2011 Ford Foundation Visionaries Award for his contributions to creating financial opportunities for the poor
- 2011 John. W. Kuykendall Award Service Award
- 2013 Hubert H. Humphrey Civil and Human Rights Award from The Leadership Conference on Civil and Human Rights
- 2015 James Madison Medal from the Association of Princeton Graduate Alumni (APGA)
