= Sandler Foundation =

Charitable foundation

- Formation: Tax-exempt since December 1991; 34 years ago
- Type: 501(c)(3)
- Tax ID no.: 943147856
- Headquarters: San Francisco
- Director: Steve Daetz
- Net Assets: 572,269,124 USD (2024)
- Revenue: 16,621,643 USD (2024)
- Expenses: 65,066,512 USD (2024)
- Website: www.sandlerfoundation.org

Sandler Foundation is a charitable foundation formed in 1991 with support from Herbert Sandler and Marion Sandler, co-CEOs of Golden West Financial Corporation and World Savings Bank. In 2006, the Sandlers made a contribution of $1.3 billion to the foundation, which was the second largest American charitable contribution of 2006. Sandler Foundation is a spend-down foundation as the Sandlers have signed The Giving Pledge. The Sandlers founded the nonprofit investigative news organization ProPublica. Steve Daetz is president of the Sandler Foundation.

== Mission ==
Sandler Foundation's mission to "invest in strategic organizations and exceptional leaders that seek to improve the rights, opportunities and well-being of others, especially the most vulnerable and disadvantaged."

== Organizations funded ==
A 2008 New York Times article notes that the foundation has provided substantial support to several nonprofit organizations, including ProPublica, the Center for American Progress, the Center for Responsible Lending, Human Rights Watch, the American Civil Liberties Union, as well as other nonprofit organizations that conduct research in parasitic diseases, asthma (the American Asthma Foundation), and basic science (UCSF Program for Breakthrough Biomedical Research).

Sandler Foundation also helped establish the Human Rights Center at UC Berkeley, the Sandler Asthma Basic Research Center at UCSF, and the Sandler Center for Drug Discovery at UCSF (previously the Sandler Center for Basic Research in Parasitic Diseases).

Sandler Foundation has been identified as a supporter of other charitable work, including:

- A Johns Hopkins University national effort to reduce central-line associated bloodstream infections
- The Pew Charitable Trusts' "Safe Credit Cards Project"
- Public Library of Science (PLoS)
- Center on Budget and Policy Priorities
- National Center for Youth Law
- Oceana
- Earthjustice
- Free Press
- PICO National Network
- Tax Policy Center

In an article for Inside Philanthropy, David Callahan wrote that the foundation's strategy involved strong organizational leaders and providing long term general support. Callahan listed ProPublica and the Center for American Progress as notable funding successes for the Sandler Foundation.
