= Osher =

Osher may refer to:

- Osher (name)
- Osher Lifelong Learning Institutes
- Osher Center for Integrative Medicine
