= Osher Lifelong Learning Institutes =

American educational organizations for senior citizens

Osher Lifelong Learning Institutes (OLLI) offer noncredit courses with no assignments or grades to adults over age 50. Since 2001, philanthropist Bernard Osher has made grants from the Bernard Osher Foundation to launch OLLI programs at 120 universities and colleges throughout the United States.

== Background ==
Bernard Osher, a native of Maine, managed the family hardware and plumbing supply business before heading to New York to work for Oppenheimer & Company. He moved to California and became a founding director of World Savings and a founder of its parent company Golden West Financial. He bought the San Francisco auction house Butterfield & Butterfield in 1970 and sold it in 1999 to eBay. World Savings merged with Wachovia Corporation in 2006, which was in turn acquired by Wells Fargo in 2008. In 1977 he established the Bernard Osher Foundation, headquartered in San Francisco, which contributes to higher education, the arts, and social services, with education receiving nearly 80 percent of its grants.

Osher was impressed by the Fromm Institute for Lifelong Learning at the University of San Francisco, and approached the Senior Program at the University of Southern Maine (USM) with his interest in supporting noncredit programs for older adults. He awarded USM an endowment grant in 2001 to expand its program, which was renamed as the first Osher Lifelong Learning Institute. Ed Stolman, a friend of Osher’s who had retired to Sonoma County, California, approached Sonoma State University (SSU) to encourage development of an OLLI program. The Osher Foundation made a development grant to SSU which quickly attracted an audience of older student members. Encouraged by the success of these two programs, Osher decided to greatly expand his grant support for similar lifelong learning institutes.

== OLLI program development ==
In 2002 the Osher Foundation began making program development grants of $100,000 a year for up to three years to launch new OLLI programs. The initial focus was on California, which now has OLLI programs at seven University of California and 16 California State University campuses. In 2004 Osher established a National Resource Center (NRC) at USM to distribute information about effective educational programs for older adults via a web site, a research journal, and an annual conference. In October 2014 the NRC was relocated to Northwestern University's downtown Chicago, Illinois campus. In 2026, the OLLI at Colorado State University became the founding partner of the Institute for Shipboard Education, expanding opportunities for Osher members to participate in Semester at Sea's lifelong-learning program.

Under current practices, if an OLLI program has 500 fee-paying members by the end of its fourth year, the university is eligible for a $1 million endowment grant from the Osher Foundation. When it reaches 1000 members, it is eligible for another $1 million endowment grant. As of 2015, the Osher Foundation was supporting 120 OLLI programs at universities and colleges in all 50 states and the District of Columbia.

The Bernard Osher Foundation’s executive director is Barbro Sachs-Osher.

== See also ==
- Lifelong learning
- Semester at Sea
