= PLATO Society of Los Angeles =

Adult education in the United States

The PLATO Society of Los Angeles (formerly the PLATO Society of UCLA) is a lifelong learning institute in Westwood, south of the UCLA campus, that focuses on small peer-led study discussion groups. About 400 members attend 70 or more study discussion groups every year, year-round, that are designed and led by the members themselves. Active over 40 years, the PLATO Society is the oldest lifelong learning institute in the western United States. Its pioneering efforts created institute networking organizations which helped new lifelong learning institutes get established more easily, resulting in their rapid spread throughout the USA.

== History ==
Educator Elizabeth L. Cless founded the PLATO Society of UCLA in 1980, in conjunction with UCLA Extension, based on her study and proposal for a self-directed, self-governing lifelong learning institute. By 1983, with 239 members, the PLATO Society was already being run entirely by its members.

In 1984, Francis Meyers, then the president of the PLATO Society, founded and became president of ALIROW, the first networking organization for American lifelong learning institutes. The PLATO Society was one of its six founding institutes. For decades it facilitated communication and the spread of organizational information across the Far West region of the United States.

In 1988, the PLATO Society and Meyers spearheaded the formation of a USA-wide institute network, the Elderhostel Institute Network, by working with four other well-established lifelong learning institutes and the travel corporation Elderhostel. That network, now known as the Road Scholar Lifelong Learning Institute Network, has over 400 member institutes.

In 2013, faced with a challenge to its self-governance, the PLATO Society reconstituted itself as a nonprofit corporation, The PLATO Society of Los Angeles.

In March 2020, responding to the rapid spread of COVID-19, the PLATO Society moved its study discussion groups, Colloquia, and most committee activities fully online. Casual online "Lounge" meetings were added to compensate for the loss of in-person casual conversation among friends. The transition to fully online PLATO has led to enabling the participation of members as distant as London, England. PLATO's Medical Committee has allowed in-person operations to resume, so some study discussion groups (SDGs) and other activities are live, though some are still online.

== Peer-led study discussion groups ==
Study Discussion Groups (SDGs) are the central learning activity of the PLATO Society. Discussions in a 14-member SDG are peer-led and seminar-style, and are designed to add a "social aspect" to learning as a mentally stimulating intellectual exercise.

SDGs are scheduled in three 14-week terms per year. SDGs can be 14, 10, or 7 weeks in length. (Members select 7-week SDGs to help schedule their vacations.) An SDG divides up its topics at the start of a term so that each member leads a discussion in a specific week. An SDG meets for two hours on a weekday.

SDGs originate with proposals from members on topics in art, biology, economics, history, literature, movies, music, political science, psychology, science, or technology. Each proposal is ranked by members, gets worked out in detail by a member who agrees to be its "coordinator", and then becomes available for members to select as their next term's SDG.

In December 1999, The New York Times profiled the PLATO Society, interviewed members, and sat in on a SDG meeting.

== Programs ==
The PLATO Society offers a program of eight Colloquia each year, which are major lectures at which important scholars, journalists, public officials, and other professionals give formal presentations on matters of general interest. Each Colloquium is held in the early afternoon in a large auditorium away from the PLATO facility, is announced in advance, and is open to the public, as well as to PLATO Society members, at no charge.

The PLATO Society has a variety of extracurricular activities for members. They include monthly day trips to local places of interest, informal lunchtime presentations, social events, an annual three-day meeting at an outdoor retreat venue, group foreign travel, and non-sponsored interest groups.

Video recordings of all Colloquia from 2013 to the present are viewable in the video gallery on the PLATO Society website.

== Administration and governance ==
The PLATO Society is independent and self-governed. Its board of directors, elected annually to one-year terms by the membership, includes the president, other officers, and the heads of seven standing committees. Members perform nearly all operational tasks, including proposing SDGs, serving as coordinators, handling financial and facility matters, staffing the visitors' desk, and staffing committees that oversee development of SDGs, seek coordinators, handle SDG registration, develop Colloquia, and run noncurricular programs.
