= Fromm Institute for Lifelong Learning =

Coordinates: 37°46′46″N 122°27′07″W

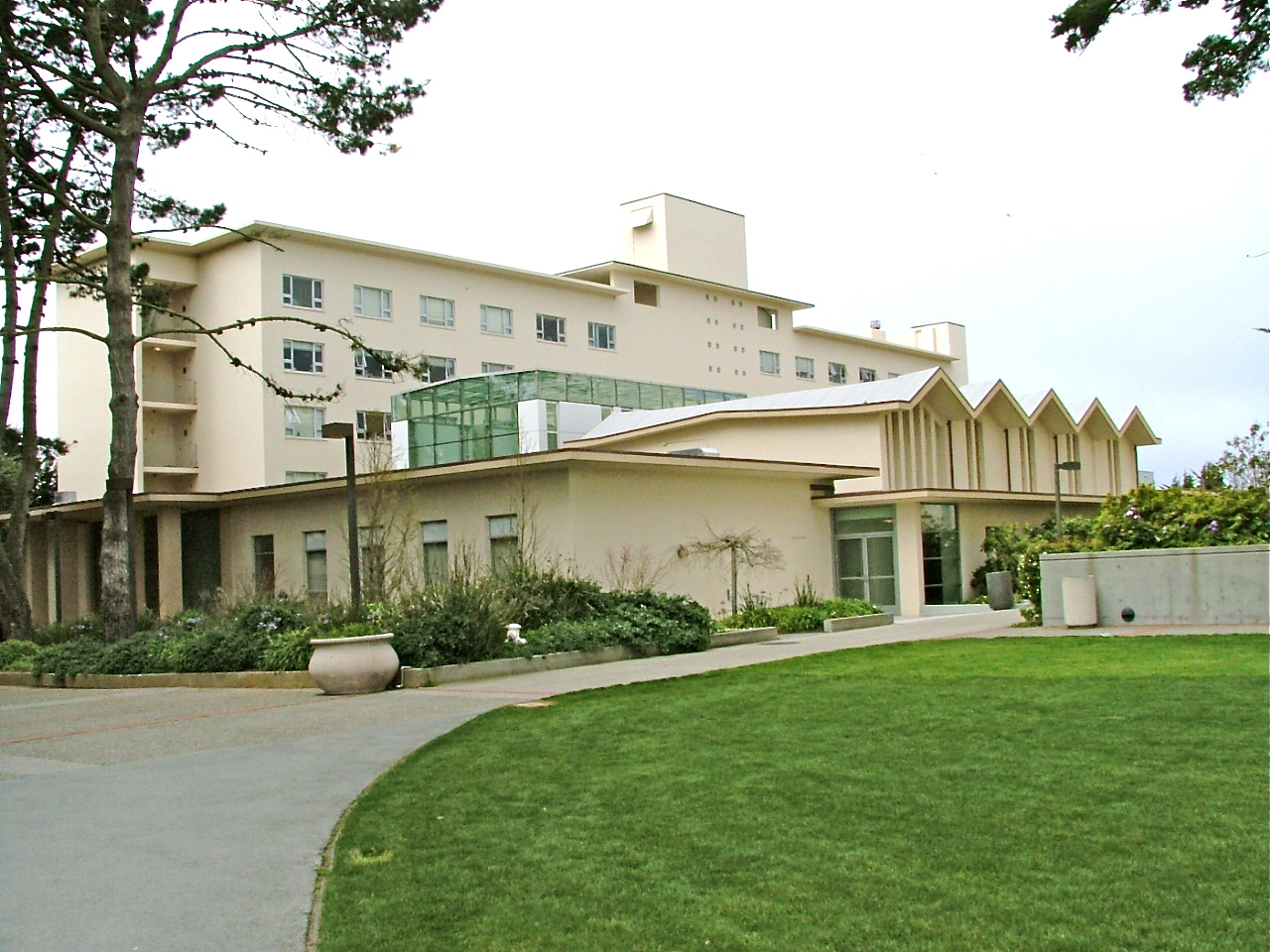
Fromm Hall

The Fromm Institute for Lifelong Learning at the University of San Francisco (USF) offers noncredit courses with no assignments or grades for adults age 50 and over with no other objective than the love of learning. Organized in 1976 with support from Hanna and Alfred Fromm, the Institute’s program served as a model for the Osher Lifelong Learning Institutes that have been established at over 120 universities and colleges in the United States.

== Origins ==
The Fromm Institute was founded by Hanna Fromm (1914 – 2003) and her husband Alfred Fromm (1905 – 1998), who had arrived in the United States as refugees from Germany in 1936. Born Hanna Gruenbaum to a prominent Jewish family in Nuremberg, she studied choreography and worked in the Paris fashion industry. Alfred Fromm, born in Kitzingen, Germany, was a fourth-generation winemaker. Hanna and Alfred married in 1936 and fled the Nazis, first to New York and then to California, where Alfred formed a partnership to distribute Christian Brothers wine and brandy. Alfred took over the Paul Masson vineyards in the 1950s, and began a commitment to philanthropy. Hanna became ardently committed to an active intellectual life for retirees, helping launch the Lifelong Learning program at USF with financial support and by serving as its volunteer executive director until the last months of her life. In 1979 the Fromms were awarded honorary doctorates of public service by USF.

== Program ==
The Fromm Institute offers some 75 courses annually, spread over fall, winter, and spring terms. The program is strong on courses in the humanities, arts, and sciences. Courses meet once a week for eight weeks. Faculty are primarily emeriti professors from universities and colleges in the San Francisco Bay Area. The program has grown from 300 students members in 1976 to 1250 student members today. Student membership fees cover half the program costs, with the balance coming from gifts, grants, and endowment earnings. The Fromms established a sister program at Hebrew University in Jerusalem in 1979. After Hanna Fromm’s death in 2003, former program director Robert Fordham was named executive director. The Institute publishes a monthly newsletter, From the Rooftop, during the academic year.

The Fromm program caught the attention of another San Francisco philanthropist, Bernard Osher, who was inspired to spread the model to over 120 Osher Lifelong Learning Institutes that his foundation has funded at universities and colleges across the United States since 2001.

== Fromm Hall ==
Fromm Hall, formerly a Jesuit faculty residence known as Xavier Hall, was renamed for Alfred and Hanna Fromm on October 24, 2003. The building was remodeled following a $10 million capital campaign by Friends of the Fromm Institute, with a lead gift from Hanna Fromm. In addition to the Fromm Institute’s administrative offices and four large classrooms, Fromm Hall also contains USF’s only all-female residence, housing 175 freshman and sophomore women, facilities for the fine arts program, a women’s institute, and the parish offices of St. Ignatius Church.

== Video documentary ==
"Old Enough to Know Better" is a documentary film directed by Ron Levaco on the Fromm Institute and its students. It was released in 2001 by Icarus Films.
