= Marion Sandler =

American banker and philanthropist (1930-2012)

- Born: Marion Osher; October 17, 1930; Biddeford, Maine, U.S.
- Died: June 1, 2012 (aged 81); San Francisco, California, U.S.
- Education: Wellesley College (BA); New York University (MBA)
- Known for: Co-Founder of Golden West Financial Corporation
- Spouse: Herbert Sandler
- Children: 2
- Relatives: Bernard Osher (brother)

Marion Osher Sandler (October 17, 1930 – June 1, 2012) was the co-CEO (with her husband Herbert Sandler) of Golden West Financial Corporation and World Savings Bank. In 2004, after 43 years running Golden West Financial Corporation, she was described by the Columbia School of Journalism as "the first and longest-serving woman chief executive officer in the United States."

== Early life ==
Born Marion Osher in Biddeford, Maine, on October 17, 1930, to Samuel and Leah Osher, Jewish immigrants from Lithuania and Russia. Her parents owned a hardware store and were successful in real estate. Her brother is Bernard Osher. She earned a bachelor's degree from Wellesley College in 1952 and an MBA from New York University in 1958. She worked for two years as a buyer at Bloomingdale's before landing a job on Wall Street, as a securities analyst at Dominick & Dominick. She was the first woman hired by the firm who was not a receptionist.

== Career ==
In 1963, with $3.8 million in funding from her brother, Bernard, who was a successful businessman, she and her husband created a holding company, Golden West Financial Corporation, and acquired Golden West Savings and Loan Association (renamed the World Savings Bank) in California. At the time it was a small institution with one branch. The Sandlers tried new products, and Golden West became the first institution to offer adjustable rate mortgages. Golden West grew into one of the largest thrifts in the U.S. with assets of approximately $125 billion, deposits of $60 billion, and 12,000 employees. Under the Sandlers' management, Golden West generated a 19 percent average annual compound growth in earnings per share over a 39-year period. The company was described as "one of the most efficient and productive money machines on the planet", and was included 10 times in Fortune magazine's annual list of the United States' most admired companies. The Sandlers were also named "2004 CEOs of the Year" by Morningstar, Inc.

Golden West was sold in October 2006 for $24 billion to Wachovia Bank. The Sandlers owned about 10% of the company at the time of the sale, making their share of the sale price worth $2.4 billion. Of this the Sandlers gave $1.3 billion to the Sandler Foundation.

== Philanthropy ==
The Sandlers helped found and are among the largest benefactors of the Center for Responsible Lending, a nonprofit, nonpartisan organization fighting predatory mortgage lending, payday loans, and other products that prey on consumers; the Center for American Progress, a progressive think tank; ProPublica, an investigative reporting newsroom; and the American Asthma Foundation. In addition, the Sandlers or their foundation support organizations involved in medical research, the environment, human rights, and civil liberties.

== Personal life ==
In 1961, she married Herbert Sandler. They had two children, Susan Sandler and James Sandler.
