= Osher (name) =

Osher (Hebrew: אושר) is a Hebrew name, a variant of Asher. Notable people with the name include:

== Given name ==
- Osher Cohen (born 1998), Israeli musician
- Osher Davida (born 2001), Israeli footballer
- Osher Günsberg (born 1974), Australian journalist and television and radio presenter
- Osher Weiss (born 1953), American rabbi and author
- Osher Zeitun (born 1991), Israeli footballer
- Osher Zilberstein, former leader of Breed Street Shul
- Daniel Osher Nathan, American philosopher
- Marion Osher Sandler, American banker and philanthropist

== Surname ==
- Barbro Sachs-Osher (born 1940), Swedish diplomat
- Bernard Osher (born 1927), American businessman
- Katherine Osher, married name of Kathy Read (born 1959), English swimmer
- Laurie Osher (born 1960), American politician
- Stanley Osher (born 1942), American mathematician
