= Osheroff =

Osheroff (Russian: Ошеров, romanized: Osherov) is a Russian surname derived from the given name 'Osher'. Notable people with the surname include:

- Abraham Osheroff (1915–2008), American social activist, carpenter, war veteran, documentary filmmaker, and lecturer
- Douglas Osheroff (born 1945), American physicist
