= Center for Responsible Lending =

American nonprofit organization

- Type: 501(c)(3)
- Founded: 2002
- Headquarters: Durham, North Carolina
- Key people: Michael Calhoun (president); Martin Eakes (CEO)
- Products: Research; Advocacy
- Website: www.responsiblelending.org

The Center for Responsible Lending (CRL) is a nonprofit organization research and policy group based in Durham, North Carolina, United States. Its stated purpose is to educate the public about financial products and to push for policies that curb predatory lending. CRL is affiliated with the Center for Community Self-Help.

== History ==
Temple Building in Durham, North Carolina. There are small Self-Help and CRL signs to the left of the door.

In 2002, the Center for Community Self-Help founded the CRL as a nonprofit, nonpartisan research and policy organization focused on consumer protection in financial products and services, including mortgages, credit cards, payday lending, and bank overdraft fees.. Its name echoed the Coalition for Responsible Lending that allied to support legislation against predatory lending in North Carolina in 1999. The CRL's first location was in the Temple Building in Durham, North Carolina.

Self-Help founded the CRL to continue its research work, such as the 2001 report Quantifying the Economic Cost of Predatory Lending. The first report issued by CRL, in 2004, was A Review of Wells Fargo's Subprime Lending. Other early reports focused on credit card debt, payday lending, and auto-title lending. CRL has continued to issue research reports, issue briefs, and policy statements on a range of topics. One of the most widely read and influential reports from CRL was Losing Ground: Foreclosures in the Subprime Market and Their Cost to Homeowners, published in late 2006, which established CRL's national reputation by signaling the risk building in the subprime mortgage market.

CRL has pushed for financial reform including the creation of the Consumer Financial Protection Agency in the wake of the mortgage meltdown

Martin Eakes, CEO of the Center for Responsible Lending and Self-Help, has stated that problems in the subprime lending market were driven by a focus on self-interest among financial actors. He advocates for a broader definition of success that includes benefits to families and communities through sustainable lending practices.

In 2023, CRL supported South Carolina legislation (S.910) aimed at limiting access to small-dollar loans. The bill faced opposition from free-market advocacy groups, which argued that it unfairly exempted larger financial institutions, including credit unions such as Self-Help, while imposing restrictions on short-term lenders.

== Funding Sources ==
Herbert Sandler and his wife Marion Sandler, founders of the Sandler Foundation, provided startup funding for the CRL's first five years, and the foundation has continued to support it financially. The Sandlers's financial company, Golden West, was scrutinized by CBS's 60 Minutes for its role in the 2008 subprime mortgage crisis. CRL has also drawn attention for its funding sources, having received over $3 million from the Foundation to Promote Open Society between 2018 and 2022, according to IRS filings and foundation reports.

The Center for Community Self-Help, the network of nonprofit organizations with which CRL is affiliated, has received over $500 million in federal funding through the U.S. Treasury’s Community Development Financial Institutions Fund (CDFI Fund). These funds were awarded through approximately 65 limited liability companies (LLCs) in North Carolina, many with similar names, such as Self-Help Investor III and Self-Help Investor IX, reflecting the organizational structure of the broader Self-Help network.

== Lobbying work ==
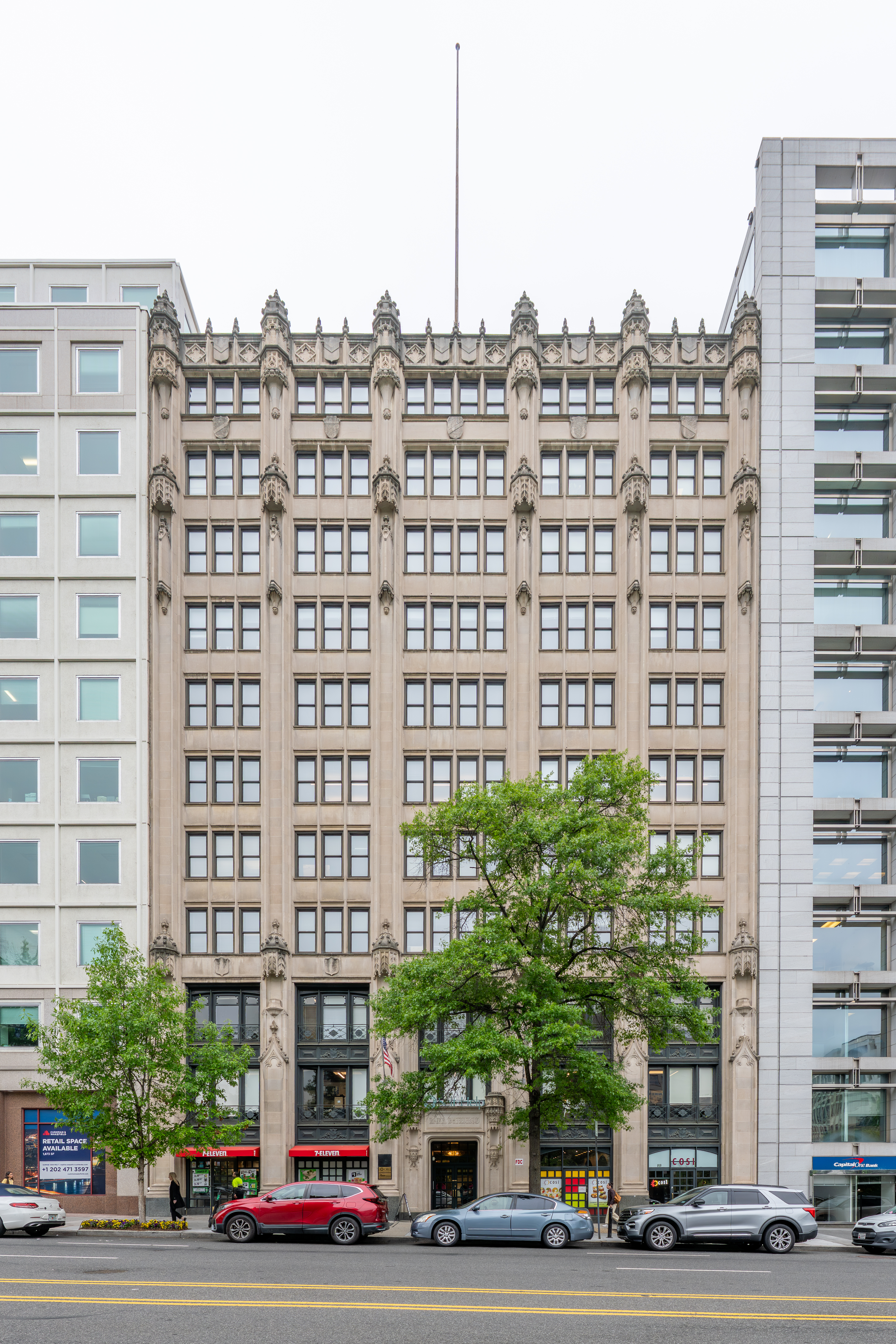
Barr Building in Washington, DC

In 2004, the Center for Community Self-Help purchased the Barr Building in Washington, DC. Its location near K Street and the White House facilitated the lobbying work of the CRL who occupied a floor of the building.

An investigation by Politico revealed CRL played a role in helping the Consumer Financial Protection Bureau (CFPB) draft new regulations on payday loans. According to Politico, "The group regularly sent over policy papers, traded emails and met multiple times with top officials responsible for drafting the rule. At the same time, the group's financial services business, Self Help Credit Union, was pushing CFPB to support its own small-dollar loan product with a much lower interest rate as an alternative to payday loans."

CRL opposed the Mortgage Choice Act of 2013 (H.R. 3211; 113th Congress), which proposed changes to the Consumer Financial Protection Bureau’s regulations on qualified mortgages by introducing new exclusions.

== Awards ==
In 2012, the CRL received the MacArthur Foundation's Award for Creative and Effective Institutions. This $2 million award was used for an endowment to support the organization's sustainability.

In 2013, the Leadership Conference on Civil and Human Rights presented Eakes and the CRL with its Hubert H. Humphrey Award.
