= Herbert Sandler =

American banker and philanthropist (1931-2019)

Herb Sandler
- Born: November 16, 1931; New York City, New York, U.S.
- Died: June 5, 2019 (aged 87); San Francisco, California, U.S.
- Education: City College of New York (BA); Columbia University (LLB)
- Spouse: Marion Osher

Herbert Sandler (November 16, 1931 – June 5, 2019) was a co-CEO (with his wife, Marion Sandler) of Golden West Financial Corporation and World Savings Bank. He died on June 4, 2019, at the age of 87. Golden West Financial's lending practices had Time magazine include Sandler and his wife Marion in their list of the "25 People to Blame for the Financial Crisis".

== Early life ==
Herbert Sandler was born on November 16, 1931, in New York City. He grew up in a Jewish family in the Bronx.

== Education ==
Sandler graduated from Stuyvesant High School in New York City and the City College of New York in 1951. He graduated from Columbia Law School in 1954.

== Career ==
In 1963, the Sandlers created Golden West Financial Corporation, a savings and loan holding company, to acquire Golden West Savings and Loan Association, the predecessor to World Savings Bank. Since that time, Golden West grew into one of the largest thrifts in the U.S. with assets of approximately $125 billion, deposits of $60 billion, and 12,000 employees. Under the Sandlers' management, Golden West generated a 19 percent average annual compound growth in earnings per share over a 39-year period. The company was described as "one of the most efficient and productive money machines on the planet", and was included 10 times in Fortune magazine's annual list of the United States' most admired companies. The Sandlers were also named "2004 CEOs of the Year" by Morningstar, Inc.

In an article on the death of Marion Sandler, Ryan Mac of Forbes notes that Golden West "instituted borrowing practices that were largely blamed for the housing market collapse".

Golden West was sold in 2006 for $24 billion to Wachovia Bank and the acquisition was completed in October 2006. The Sandlers owned about 10% of the company at the time of the sale, making their share of the sale price worth about $2.4 billion. Of this the Sandlers gave $1.3 billion to the Sandler Foundation.

== Role in subprime mortgage crisis ==
Sandler and his wife have throughout their public life denounced predatory lenders and the poor underwriting practices of other lenders. However, the actual practices of their firm especially in the 2000s, undermined their conservative lending principles and reputations, especially in the wake of the housing crash in 2008.

The Sandlers are credited with the invention of the "Pick-A-Pay" mortgage that allowed borrowers to pay less than the interest due on their loan each month—which increased the total amount owed by the borrower. Analysts place the blame on the near failure of Wachovia in the fall of 2008 on the "Pick-A-Pay" mortgage portfolio they acquired from the Sandler's firm.

Martin Eakes, the director of the Center for Responsible Lending, said that prepayment penalties would make it hard for cash-poor borrowers to refinance a loan for one with more manageable terms, and helped to get a law passed in North Carolina prohibiting such charges. The Sandlers supported prepayment penalties, acknowledging that lenders used the penalties to lock borrowers into “absolutely awful” loans, but saying that his firm used the penalties to fend off unethical brokers who enticed borrowers with low-interest-rate loans that often had hidden fees. Sandler described independent brokers as "the whores of the world”, nonetheless by 2006 independent brokers generated 60 percent of World Savings' loan business, and he claimed that he was compelled to do so because of brokers were a dominant force in the mortgage industry. World Savings was supposed to telephone applicants to ensure that they understood the terms of their loan, as a check on the representations that brokers made to borrowers, but these calls reached only about half of the borrowers.

== Philanthropy ==
The Sandlers helped found and were among the largest benefactors of the Center for Responsible Lending, a nonprofit, nonpartisan organization fighting predatory mortgage lending, payday loans, and other products that prey on consumers; the Center for American Progress, a progressive think tank; ProPublica, an investigative reporting newsroom; and the American Asthma Foundation.

The Sandlers established the Sandler Foundation in 1991, which has donated hundreds of millions of dollars to various causes, primarily focusing on scientific research, civil liberties, and social justice. In 2006, the Sandlers made a contribution of $1.3 billion to the foundation, which was the second largest American charitable contribution of that year.
