= Carnegie Commission of Investigation on the Poor White Question in South Africa =

1932 study of poverty

"The Poor White Problem in South Africa: Report of the Carnegie Commission" (1932) was a study of poverty among white South Africans that made recommendations about segregation that some have argued would later serve as a blueprint for Apartheid. The report was funded and published by the Carnegie Corporation.

== Background ==
Before the study, white poverty had long been the subject of debate in South Africa, and poor whites the subject of church, scholarly and state attention. White poverty became a social problem in the early 1900s, when many whites were dispossessed of land as a result of the Second Anglo-Boer War, especially in the Cape and Transvaal. It was not uncommon to find whites who were driven into wage labour managing a lifestyle similar to that of Bantu wage labourers. As white proletarianisation proceeded and racial integration began to emerge as an urban phenomenon, white poverty attracted attention and concern. In the 1870s, for example, a colonial visitor to Grahamstown wrote that "miscellaneous herds of whites and blacks lived together in the most promiscuous manner imaginable."

According to one memorandum sent to Frederick Keppel, then president of Carnegie, there was "little doubt that if the Bantu were given full economic opportunity, the more competent among them would soon outstrip the less competent whites". Keppel's support for the project of creating the report was motivated by his concern with the maintenance of existing racial boundaries. The preoccupation of the Carnegie Corporation with the so-called poor white problem in South Africa was at least in part the outcome of similar misgivings about the state of poor whites in the American South.

== The report ==
The commission report encompassed five volumes that dealt, in turn, with the economic, psychological, educational, health, and sociological facets of the "poor white" phenomenon.

At the turn of the century white Americans and whites elsewhere in the world felt uneasy because poverty and economic depression seemed to strike people regardless of race. White poverty contradicted notions of racial superiority and hence it became the focus of "scientific" study. The report recommended that "employment sanctuaries" be established for poor white workers and that poor white workers should replace "native" black workers in most skilled aspects of the economy. The authors of the report suggested that unless something was done to help poor whites racial deterioration and miscegenation would be the outcome.

Although the ground work for Apartheid began earlier, the report provided support for the idea that the maintenance of white superiority would require support from social institutions. This was the justification for the segregation, and discrimination of the following decades. The report expressed fear about the loss of white racial pride, and in particular pointed to the danger that the poor white would not be able to resist the process of "Bantu-isation." In seeking to prevent a class-based movement that would unite the poor across racial lines the report sought to heighten race as opposed to class differences as the significant social category.

== Impact ==
The findings of the report helped bolster support for segregation and strict limits and laws for black South Africans. The hope was that the program of segregation would help poor whites, by giving them institutional assistance, and thus prevent race-mixing and maintain racial purity and economic power. Because of the "poor white problem" institutional racism in South Africa would differ from institutional racism in other parts of the world where scientific racism, which supposed intrinsic racial differences, played a more prominent role (many white Afrikaners have multi-racial ancestors).

Although scientific racism played a role in justifying and supporting institutional racism in South Africa, it was not as important in South Africa as it has been in Europe and the United States. This was due, in part to the "poor white problem", described by the report. The report raised serious questions for supremacists about white racial superiority. Since poor whites were found to be in the same situation as Bantu in the African environment, the idea that intrinsic white superiority could overcome any environment did not seem to hold. As such, "scientific" justifications for racism were not as widely used in South Africa as they were in other parts of the world.
