= Elizabeth L. Cless =

American educator (1916–1992)

- Born: January 28, 1916; Akron, Ohio, U.S.
- Died: July 20, 1992 (aged 76); Cambridge, Massachusetts, U.S.
- Education: Radcliffe College (BA)
- Occupation: Educator
- Spouse(s): Irving Clark (m. 1942) Howard L. Cless
- Children: 2

Elizabeth Lawrence Cless (January 28, 1916 – July 20, 1992) was an American educator. She pioneered the development of continuing education for women, which provides new paths and programs to help women resume higher education that they had interrupted or postponed. Starting at the University of Minnesota in 1960, and subsequently at The Claremont Colleges in California, Cless developed and expanded the scope of those programs; by 1970 educators had created 400 of them throughout the United States. In 1979 she developed and founded The Plato Society, a lifelong learning organization at the University of California, Los Angeles focused on the intellectual growth of men and women over 50. Cless appears in Feminists Who Changed America, 1963–1975.

== Early life and education ==
Elizabeth Lawrence was born in Akron, Ohio, on January 28, 1916. Her father was a traveling businessman; she attended 11 different schools before reaching the tenth grade. Her high school was the University of Minnesota laboratory school; she went to Florence, Italy, for a final, art-immersed high-school year. She attended Radcliffe College, graduating in 1938 with a B.A. degree cum laude in the fine arts of India. Her first year of graduate work was in the museum administration program of Harvard's Fogg Museum; her second was at the Oriental Institute of the University of Hawaii.

== Marriage and travel ==
In 1942, she married U. S. Navy lieutenant Irving Clark. During the war years, she held a variety of fine arts jobs, including at the U.S. Department of State in Washington, D.C., where she used intelligence reports to locate art treasures and get them moved out of the war's path to safety. After the war, she cared for her two young children and participated in women's clubs and civic activities in Minnesota. Three years after her first marriage ended, she married Howard L. Cless, a paper products executive.

== The Minnesota Plan ==
Cless joined the general extension division of the University of Minnesota in 1954. Her original job was to work with faculty members to set up civic, cultural, and liberal arts workshops. That led to involvement in programs to update the skills of professional women, including social workers, K-12 educators, and nurse anesthetists. In 1958 she began meeting informally with University faculty members interested in renewing the intellectual skills of a generation of "Rusty Ladies"—capable women who had been away from school for several years. Cless was asked to plan an experimental liberal arts seminar for them. Sixteen women took that seminar in the fall of 1959.

With University support, Cless teamed with Virginia L. Senders of its Psychology Department to create the "Minnesota Plan for the Continuing Education of Women," which won a three-year, $110,000 Carnegie Corporation of New York grant. This was the first of three Carnegie grants to experimental programs of continuing education for women across the United States. It launched in 1960 with Cless and Senders as co-directors and the program's purpose the full, productive use of educated women. Over 300 women enrolled during its first year; by 1965, when Cless left, over 2500 women were enrolled, and she was a consultant to nearly 100 women's continuing education programs in the United States and Canada.

== The Claremont Colleges ==
In 1965, the Claremont Colleges in Southern California proposed a similar program to the Carnegie Corporation for funding, but open to mid-career-changing men as well as women, and doing research "in the area of non-traditional study and the non-traditional student." It would build on what had been learned from the Minnesota Plan and similar programs, but would go beyond them. Soon a job offer reached Cless and the family moved to Claremont.

The Claremont Colleges' Center for Continuing Education (CCE) opened its doors in 1966 with Cless as its director. CCE focused on people who wanted to acquire an interrupted or postponed degree in an existing college setting. It served a wide variety of students. Educational counseling and planning were key aspects of its program. One-on-one counselors helped students define and navigate choices and worked to accommodate their flexible and part-time attendance needs. Courses were made available at many educational institutions in addition to those in the Claremont cluster. Cless introduced two interdisciplinary liberal arts seminars at CCE in 1967 and a third seminar in 1968.

In 1972, Cless was elected president of the National Coalition for Research on Women's Education and Development. She continued as the Director of CCE until June 30, 1975.

== UCLA ==
In 1979 Cless performed a feasibility study and wrote a proposal for a learning-in-retirement program at UCLA Extension, spending her weekdays at UCLA and returning to Claremont only at weekends. She became the director of the new program from 1980 into 1983, after which The PLATO Society continued as a self-directed, self-governing lifelong learning institute.

== Honors ==
In June 1970, the Radcliffe College Alumnae Association gave Cless its highest honor, the Alumnae Recognition Award. Cless was elected to the Radcliffe College Board of Trustees in 1971. She was a Los Angeles Times Woman of the Year honoree in 1970 and was listed in Who's Who Among American Women in 1972.

In 1985, after her husband died, Cless moved to Cambridge, Massachusetts, near her daughter, son-in-law, and two grandchildren. Cless died in Cambridge on July 20, 1992, at age 76.
