= Lifelong learning institutes =

Organized group for college-level study

A lifelong learning institute is an organized group of people over 50 years of age who meet frequently for college-level study just for its intellectual challenge and social enjoyment. (Lifelong learning institute is a term used in the United States. For similar organizations outside the United States, see University of the Third Age). Unlike continuing education, career development is not an objective of a lifelong learning institute; no credit is earned from any sponsoring college or university. Hundreds of thousands of people over 50 now participate in this intellectual endeavor which did not exist before 1962.

== Early history ==
In 1962 the Institute for Retired Professionals (IRP) was founded in New York City in association with the New School for Social Research (now New School University). At Harvard College, the Harvard Institute for Learning in Retirement (HILR) was founded in 1977. The Duke Institute for Learning in Retirement (DILR, now OLLI at Duke) was founded in 1977 as a joint venture of Duke University Continuing Education and Duke's Center for the Study of Aging and Human Development. The PLATO Society of UCLA(now The PLATO Society of Los Angeles) was founded in 1980 at UCLA Extension. The University of Connecticut Center for Learning in Retirement was founded in 1981, and the Institute for Learning in Retirement was founded at American University in 1982.

== Elderhostel Institute Network / Road Scholar Lifelong Learning Institute Network ==
By the mid-1980s about 50 lifelong learning institutes had been started. Requests to older lifelong learning institutes for information and assistance in setting up new institutes had become overwhelming. In 1984 a regional network, the Association for Learning in Retirement of the West (ALIROW), was formed to assist. Its usefulness led representatives of the lifelong learning institutes at New School University, Harvard College, UCLA, Duke University, and American University to create a national network. To implement it they teamed with Elderhostel, an established travel corporation that serviced the same age group.

The Elderhostel Institute Network opened in 1988 with the mission of supporting its member lifelong learning institutes, leading workshops, giving advice on how to start new institutes, and providing information about its member institutes, which numbered about 75 in 1988. By 1994 there were nearly 300 member institutes; by 2006 there were over 350 member institutes, and by 2019 there were over 400 member institutes. In 2013, a corporate name change resulted in the Elderhostel Institute Network getting the new name "Road Scholar Lifelong Learning Institute Network."

== Osher Foundation funding ==
The private, charitable Bernard Osher Foundation greatly increased the funding of lifelong learning institutes across the United States beginning in 2001. That year, the foundation gave an endowment grant to Senior College at the University of Southern Maine, whereupon it renamed itself the Osher Lifelong Learning Institute, or OLLI. That was the first of numerous renamings of existing lifelong learning institutes as Osher Lifelong Learning Institutes when they accepted Osher Foundation grants.

In 2002 the foundation broadened its grantmaking with initial grants of $100,000 to campuses in the California State University and University of California systems, with annual renewals possible until the endowment gift was a million dollars or more. Similarly-generous grants continued for years until the Osher Foundation was supporting 123 lifelong learning institutes spanning all 50 states and the District of Columbia.

== Meeting styles ==
Lifelong learning institutes use two fundamentally-different meeting styles: instructor-led and peer-led. The meeting style can affect many aspects of the learning and social experience in a lifelong learning institute.

Instructor-led meetings use an expert lecturer to present content to a passive group of lifelong learning institute members. That style is familiar to American students from elementary school through university. The extent to which members must prepare in advance is up to the lecturer. A lecturer may choose to take questions, but that is the only discussion that takes place in an instructor-led meeting except for informal post-meeting conversation. Instructor-led meetings can accommodate hundreds of members at once.

Peer-led meetings consist primarily of group discussion of content by lifelong learning institute members, who must study the content before the meeting. That meeting style is typical of graduate-level college and university seminars. The member who leads the meeting may prepare a short outline of the content, and/or discussion questions about the content, that is distributed well before the meeting. No expert is present; the discussion itself illuminates the content and can deepen members' understanding of it—and of each other. Peer-led meetings must be small enough to allow all members to interact easily.

Most of the oldest lifelong learning institutes—IRP at New School University, HILR at Harvard College, the PLATO Society of Los Angeles, and ILR at Northwestern—have peer-led meetings exclusively, while many lifelong learning institutes have instructor-led meetings with content presented by professors or knowledgeable institute members.

== Activities ==
While learning is central, many lifelong learning institutes also have busy programs of activities. Those can include opportunities at the associated college or university, such as having a library or student card or attending campus lectures, classes, or events. There are also activities that are limited to institute members, such as discussion groups, social gatherings, and theater groups; group visits to museums, art exhibitions, and historic places; regional and international group travel.

== Administration ==
Most lifelong learning institutes have administrative and financial ties to the college or university with which they are associated, with details that vary widely. A few lifelong learning institutes have total administrative and financial independence.

== Lists of institutes ==
The Road Scholar Lifelong Learning Institute Network maintains a searchable list of all its member lifelong learning institutes, including location and contact information. The Osher Foundation maintains a list of the names of all Osher Lifelong Learning Institutes. Some institutes appear in both lists.
