= Lifelong learning =

Ongoing, voluntary, and self-motivated pursuit of knowledge

Lifelong learning is the "ongoing, voluntary, and self-motivated" pursuit of learning for either personal or professional reasons.

Lifelong learning is important for an individual's competitiveness and employability. Furthermore, it enhances social inclusion, active citizenship, and personal development.

Professions generally acknowledge the importance of developing practitioners as lifelong learners. In the case of many licensed professions, the ongoing pursuit of professional development is a prerequisite for maintaining licensure.

Lifelong learning institutes are educational organisations that are specifically designed for the purpose of facilitating lifelong learning. Informal lifelong learning communities also exist around the world.

== History ==
In some contexts, the term "lifelong learning" evolved from the term "life-long learners", created by Leslie Watkins and used by Clint Taylor, professor at CSULA and Superintendent for the Temple City Unified School District, in the district's mission statement in 1993, the term recognises that learning is not confined to childhood or the classroom but takes place throughout life and in a range of situations.

In other contexts, the term "lifelong learning" evolved organically. The first lifelong learning institute began at The New School for Social Research (now The New School) in 1962 as an experiment in "learning in retirement". Later, after similar groups formed across the United States, many chose the name "lifelong learning institute" to be inclusive of nonretired persons in the same age range.

Traditional colleges and universities are beginning to recognize the value of lifelong learning outside of the credit and degree attainment model. Lifelong learners, including persons with academic or professional credentials, tend to find higher-paying occupations, leaving monetary, cultural, and entrepreneurial impressions on communities, according to educator Cassandra B. Whyte.

=== Libraries in the United States ===
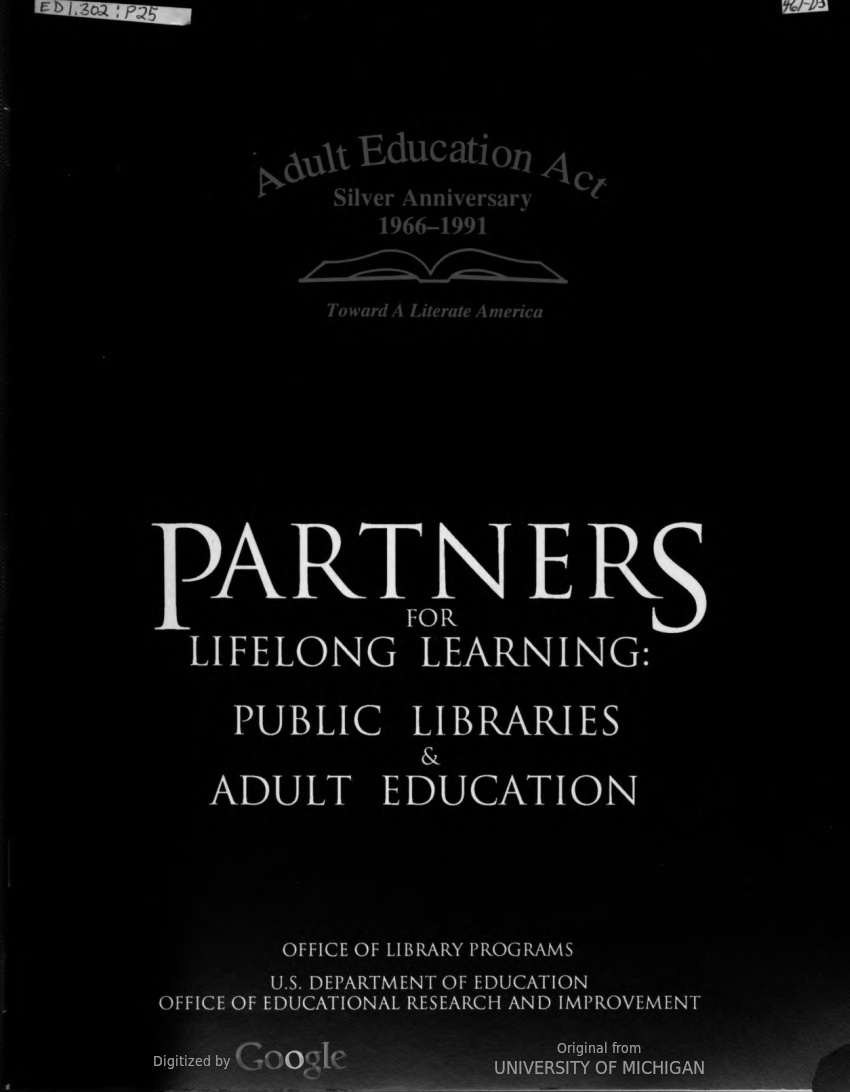
Partners for Lifelong Learning, Public Libraries and Adult Education

In the United States, librarians have understood lifelong learning as an essential service of libraries since the early part of the 20th century. In 1924, William S. Learned, wrote of the potential of the American public library as an agency for adult education in The American Public Library and the Diffusion of Knowledge. Two decades later, in 1942, the American Library Association Adult Education Board established a new responsibility to the adult reader.

The Adult Education Act of 1966 linked literacy education and adult basic education programs. This occurred at the same time that the Library Services and Construction Act was being passed. Twenty-five years after the U.S. Adult Education Act was passed, the U.S. Office of Education published Partners for Lifelong Learning, Public Libraries and Adult Education.

The Institute of Museum and Library Services (IMLS) was established in 1996 and incorporated responsibilities from the U.S. Office of Education's library programs, including those focused on lifelong learning. "Championing Lifelong Learning" through libraries and museums is the first goal listed in the organization's strategic plan for 2022-2026.

== Definition ==
Lifelong learning has been defined as "all learning activity undertaken throughout life, with the aim of improving knowledge, skills and competences within a personal, civic, social and/or employment-related perspective". It is often considered learning that occurs after the formal education years of childhood and into adulthood. It is sought out naturally through life experiences as the learner seeks to gain knowledge for professional or personal reasons. These natural experiences can come about on purpose or accidentally.

Lifelong learning has been described as a process that includes people learning in different contexts. These environments do not only include schools but also homes, workplaces, and locations where people pursue leisure activities. However, while the learning process can be applied to learners of all ages, there is a focus on adults who are returning to organized learning. There are programs based on its framework that address the different needs of learners, such as United Nations' Sustainable Development Goal 4 and the UNESCO Institute for Lifelong Learning, which caters to the needs of the disadvantaged and marginalized learners.

Lifelong learning is distinguished from the concept of continuing education in the sense that it has a broader scope. Unlike the latter, which is oriented towards adult education developed for the needs of schools and industries, this type of learning is concerned with the development of human potential in individuals generally.

== Pedagogy ==
Lifelong learning focuses on holistic education and it has two dimensions, namely, lifelong and broad options for learning. These indicate learning that integrates traditional education proposals and modern learning opportunities. It also entails an emphasis on encouraging people to learn how to learn and to select content, process, and methodologies that pursue autodidacticism. Some authors highlight that lifelong learning is founded on a different conceptualization of knowledge and its acquisition. It is explained not only as the possession of discrete pieces of information or factual knowledge but also as a generalized scheme of making sense of new events, including the use of tactics in order to effectively deal with them.

Reflective learning and critical thinking can help a learner to become more self-reliant through learning how to learn, thus making them better able to direct, manage, and control their own learning process. Sipe studied experimentally "open" teachers and found that they valued self-directed learning, collaboration, reflection, and challenge; risk taking in their learning was seen as an opportunity, not a threat. Dunlap and Grabinger say that for higher education students to be lifelong learners, they must develop a capacity for self-direction, metacognition awareness, and a disposition toward learning.

The Delors Report proposed an integrated vision of education based on two key paradigms: lifelong learning and the four pillars of learning. It argued that formal education tends to emphasize the acquisition of knowledge to the detriment of other types of learning essential to sustaining human development, stressing the need to think of learning over the lifespan, and to address how everyone can develop relevant skills, knowledge and attitudes for work, citizenship and personal fulfillment. The four pillars of learning are:

1. Learning to know
2. Learning to do
3. Learning to be
4. Learning to live together

The four pillars of learning were envisaged against the backdrop of the notion of 'lifelong learning', itself an adaptation of the concept of 'lifelong education' as initially conceptualized in the 1972 Faure publication Learning to Be.

=== Educational technology ===
The emergence of internet technologies has great potential to support lifelong learning endeavors, allowing for informal day-to-day learning.

== Application ==
In India and elsewhere, the "University of the Third Age" (U3A) is an almost spontaneous movement comprising autonomous learning groups accessing the expertise of their own members in the pursuit of knowledge and shared experience.

In Sweden, the concept of study circles, an idea launched almost a century ago, still represents a large portion of the adult education provision. The concept has since spread, and for instance, is a common practice in Finland as well.

Formal administrative units devoted to lifelong learning exist in a number of universities. For example, the 'Academy of Lifelong Learning' is an administrative unit at the University of Delaware. Another example is the Jagiellonian University Extension (Wszechnica Uniwersytetu Jagiellonskiego), which is one of the most comprehensive Polish centers for lifelong learning (open learning, organizational learning, community learning).

In recent years, 'lifelong learning' has been adopted in the UK as an umbrella term for post-compulsory education that falls outside of the UK higher education system—further education, community education, work-based learning and similar voluntary, public sector and commercial settings.

In Ireland, lifelong learning and reskilling in higher education are supported through initiatives administered by the Higher Education Authority, including Springboard+ and the Human Capital Initiative. Springboard+ provides free or subsidised higher-education courses, while the Human Capital Initiative was established as a €300 million programme to expand skills-focused provision in higher education.

In Canada, the federal government's Lifelong Learning Plan allows Canadian residents to withdraw funds from their Registered Retirement Savings Plan to help pay for lifelong learning, but the funds can only be used for formal learning programs at designated educational institutions.

Priorities for lifelong and lifewide learning have different priorities in different countries, some placing more emphasis on economic development and some on social development. For example, the policies of China, Republic of Korea, Singapore and Malaysia promote lifelong learning in a human resource development perspective. The governments of these countries have done much to foster training and development whilst encouraging entrepreneurship.

=== Aging ===
In a 2012 New York Times article, Arthur Toga, a professor of neurology and director of the laboratory of neuroimaging at the University of California, Los Angeles, stated that "Exercising the brain may preserve it, forestalling mental decline." Some research has shown that people with higher cognitive reserves, attained through lifelong learning, were better able to avoid the cognitive decline that often accompanies age-related neurodegenerative diseases. Even when subjects had dementia, some studies show that they were able to persist in a normal mental state for a longer period than subjects who were not involved in some type of lifelong learning.

Studies so far have lacked large, randomized controlled trials. In "Education and Alzheimer's Disease: A Review of Recent International Epidemiological Studies" published in 1997 in the journal Aging and Mental Health, C.J. Gilleard, finds fault with other studies linking education to cognitive decline. Among other factors, he suggests that variations in lifestyles could be responsible for an increase in vascular dementia, as blue-collar type workers may be less inclined to work in industries that provide mentally challenging situations.

== See also ==
- Recognition of prior learning
- Folk high school
- Folkbildning, an approach to community education in Scandinavia
- Part-time student
- Perpetual student
- Autodidacticism
- Vocational education, aka technical and vocational education and training (TVET)
- Workers' Educational Association

== Sources ==
- Grady, D., (2012, March 7). Exercising an aging brain. New York Times. Retrieved from https://www.nytimes.com/2012/03/08/business/retirementspecial/retirees-are-using-education-to-exercise-an-aging-brain.html .
- US Department of Health and Human Services. (2007) Growing older in America: the health and retirement study. Retrieved from http://hrsonline.isr.umich.edu/sitedocs/databook-2006/inc/pdf/HRS-Growing-Older-in-America.pdf
- Yilmaz, K. (2008). Constructivism: Its theoretical underpinnings, variations, and implications for classroom instruction. Educational HORIZONS, Spring.
- This article incorporates text from a free content work. Licensed under CC BY-SA 3.0 IGO (license statement/permission). Text taken from Level-setting and recognition of learning outcomes: The use of level descriptors in the twenty-first century, 27–28, Keevey, James; Chakroun, Borhene. UNESCO.
- This article incorporates text from a free content work. Licensed under CC BY-SA 3.0 IGO (license statement/permission). Text taken from Partnering for prosperity: education for green and inclusive growth; Global education monitoring report, 2016; summary, 11–12. UNESCO.
