= Barbro Sachs-Osher =

Swedish diplomat

- Born: Barbro Klint; May 21, 1940 (age 86); Stockholm
- Education: Stockholm University
- Occupation: Philanthropist
- Known for: Honorary Consul General of Sweden
- Spouse(s): Hans Sachs (divorced); Bernard Osher
- Children: one
- Parent(s): Ingrid Julin Klint; Bo Klint

Barbro Sachs-Osher (born 21 May 1940) is a former Swedish honorary consul general in Los Angeles and San Francisco and a well-known philanthropist, chair of the Bernard Osher Foundation and of the Barbro Osher Pro Suecia Foundation.

== Biography ==
Osher was born in Stockholm to a Swedish family, the second of four daughters of Ingrid (née Julin) and Bo Klint. As her father was a military officer, she moved around Sweden from Stockholm to Linköping and then to Skövde. He later became the head of the Göta Kanal Company and the family moved to Motala where Osher attended high school and then went on to Stockholm University. In 1962, she became an intern with the Ambassador Program offered by the Swedish State Department; and during the summer, visited the United States with a scholarship for a program called Experiments in International Living where she lived with four different families in Kennebunkport, Maine (where she met her future husband Bernard Osher). In 1964, she returned to Sweden and completed her studies, graduating with a major in German and minors in English and Political Science from Stockholm University. After graduation, she worked at a number of jobs: as specialty book editor for the Bonnier/Forum Publishing House; then at several advertising companies, Svenska Telegrambyrån until 1975, Ekström & Lindmark, and then Hera. She then moved to the United States and worked for the Swedish Tourist Board as its US representative for three years. In 1983, she became the representative for the Swedish Royal Academy of Engineering Sciences in the Western United States. From 1995 to 1998 she served as the Honorary Consul General of Sweden in Los Angeles.

== Philanthropy ==
Together with her husband Bernard Osher she gave the third largest contribution to charity in 2006, according to the online magazine Slate. In 1991, Barbro Osher also became the owner and publisher of Vestkusten, a Swedish-American newspaper published in San Francisco since 1886. In 2007 the newspaper was merged with the New York-based Nordstjernan, published since 1872.

Together with her husband since 1980, Bernard Osher, she donated 10 million shares of Golden West Financial stock, worth 723.2 million US dollars, to the Bernard Osher Foundation. The money will be used for college scholarships, performing-arts programs, higher-education projects, and the support of three medical-education centers, established by earlier donations. The medical-education centers all aim at integrating alternative approaches to medicine such as reiki and touch healing into science-based medicine. They are located at the University of California, San Francisco School of Medicine, at Harvard Medical School, and at Karolinska Institutet in Stockholm.

In 2006, Barbro Osher was awarded an honorary doctorate at the Faculty of Fine and Applied Arts at the University of Gothenburg.

== Personal life ==
Osher has been married twice. In 1965, she married her first husband, Hans Sachs (born 1937), son of Ragnar Sachs, former president of Nordiska Kompaniet; the couple had a daughter, Camilla Sachs. In 1980, she married Bernard Osher, whom she had met while interning in the United States. .

== Sources ==
- The Bernard Osher Foundation: Biographies
- The 2006 Slate 60: Donations
- "Frikostig generalkonsul vill inspirera andra" (in Swedish) - interview in Dagens Nyheter, August 14, 2005
- Hedersdoktorer vid Konstnärliga fakulteten 2006 (in Swedish) - University of Gothenburg press release
