= Center for American Progress =

Liberal think tank in the United States

Coordinates: 38.900373°N 77.031047°W

- Abbreviation: CAP
- Founded: October 24, 2003; 22 years ago
- Founder: John Podesta
- Type: Public policy think tank
- Tax ID no.: 30-0126510
- Legal status: 501(c)(3) organization
- Headquarters: 1333 H Street, Washington, D.C., US
- President: Neera Tanden
- Affiliations: Center for American Progress Action Fund
- Revenue: $37.4 million (2024)
- Expenses: $48.3 million (2024)
- Website: americanprogress.org

The Center for American Progress (CAP) is an American public policy research and advocacy organization which presents a liberal viewpoint on economic and social issues. CAP is headquartered in Washington, D.C.

The president and chief executive officer of CAP is Neera Tanden, a Democratic political consultant and former government official. The first president and CEO was John Podesta, who has served as White House Chief of Staff to US president Bill Clinton and as the chair of the 2016 presidential campaign of Hillary Clinton. Podesta remained with the organization as chair of the board until he joined the Obama White House staff in December 2013.

== History and mission ==
The Center for American Progress was created in 2003 as a Democratic alternative to conservative think tanks such as The Heritage Foundation and the American Enterprise Institute (AEI).

Citing Podesta's influence in the Obama administration, Michael Scherer in a November 2008 article in Time stated that "not since the Heritage Foundation helped guide Ronald Reagan's transition in 1981 has a single outside group held so much sway". In 2011, the Washington Post's Jason Horowitz described the Center for American Progress as "Washington's leading liberal think tank", and "an incessant advocate for a broad progressive agenda and as such, a sharp thorn in President Obama's left side." Sarah Rosen Wartell, a co-founder and former executive vice-president of the CAP, was later named president of the Urban Institute.

In 2021, Politico described CAP as "the most influential think tank of the Biden era".

As of 2025, CAP's board of directors includes Democratic politician Julian Castro, Sandler Foundation president Steve Daetz, businessman Andrew Hauptman, former Bain Capital partner Kristin Mugford, CAP founder John Podesta, billionaire hedge fund manager Donald Sussman, CAP president and CEO Neera Tanden, and Swiss billionaire Hansjörg Wyss. On September 29, 2025, the Jamal Khashoggi-founded Democracy for the Arab World Now (DAWN) called on CAP to reconsider their decision to appoint former Secretary of State Antony Blinken to their board of directors.

== Activities ==
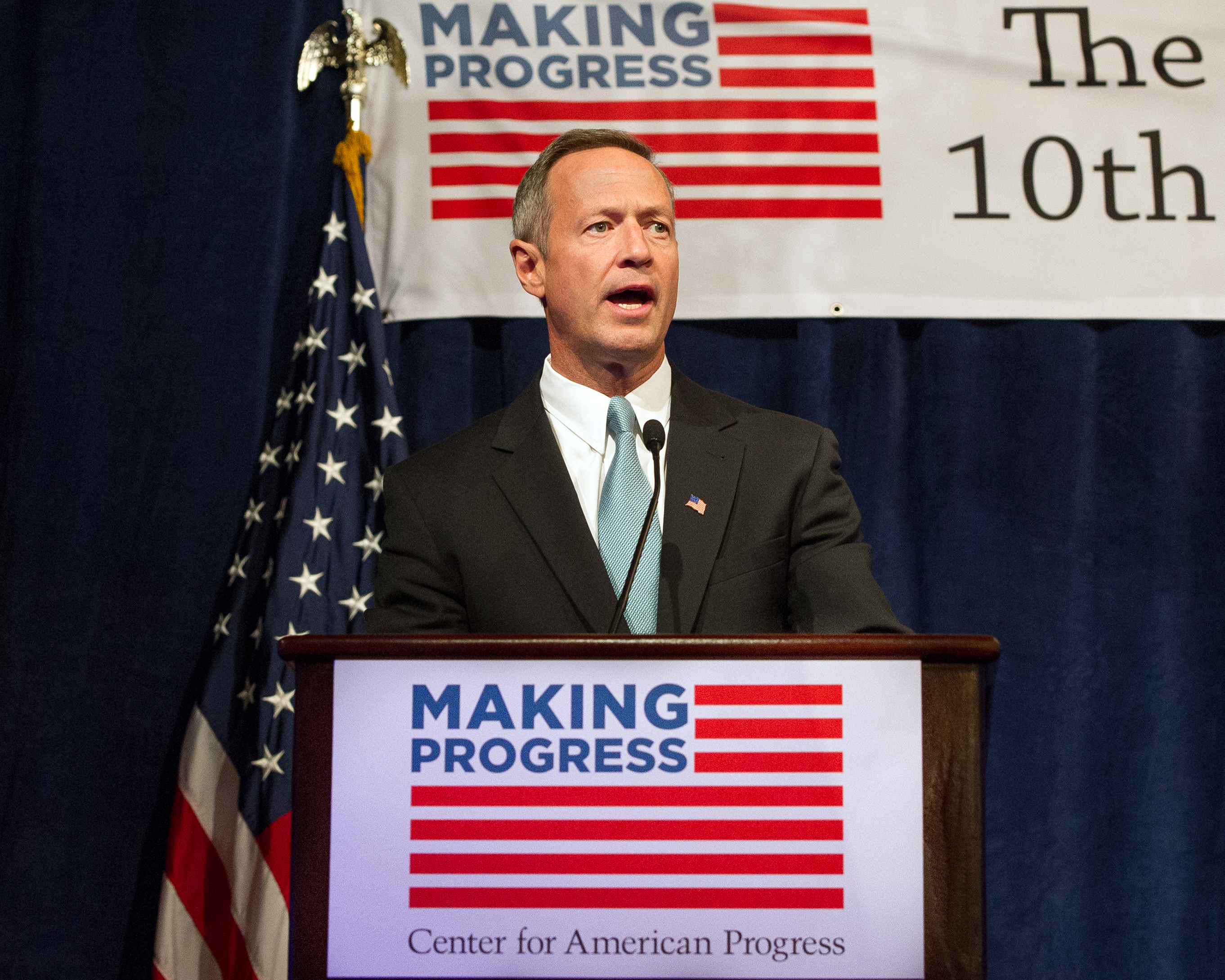
Governor Martin O'Malley speaking at the Center for American Progress

=== ThinkProgress ===
ThinkProgress, active from 2005 to 2019, was an American progressive news website affiliated with the Center for American Progress but with editorial independence. In September 2019, ThinkProgress was shut down when CAP could not find a publisher willing to take it over. The news site was then "folded into CAP's online presence" to "focus on analysis from CAP scholars and CAP Action staff."

=== Generation Progress ===
Generation Progress was launched in February 2005 as "the youth arm of the Center for American Progress." According to the organization, Generation Progress partners with over a million millennials.

=== Center for American Progress Action Fund ===
Formerly known simply as the American Progress Action Fund, the Center for American Progress Action Fund (CAP Action) is a "sister advocacy organization" and is organizationally and financially separate from CAP, although they share many staff and a physical address. Politico wrote in April 2011 that it "openly runs political advocacy campaigns, and plays a central role in the Democratic Party's infrastructure, and the new reporting staff down the hall isn't exactly walled off from that message machine, nor does it necessarily keep its distance from liberal groups organizing advocacy campaigns targeting conservatives". Whereas CAP is a 501(c)(3) nonprofit, CAP Action is a 501(c)(4), allowing it to devote more funds to lobbying. In 2003, George Soros promised to financially support the organization by donating up to $3 million. CAP Action is headed by Neera Tanden.

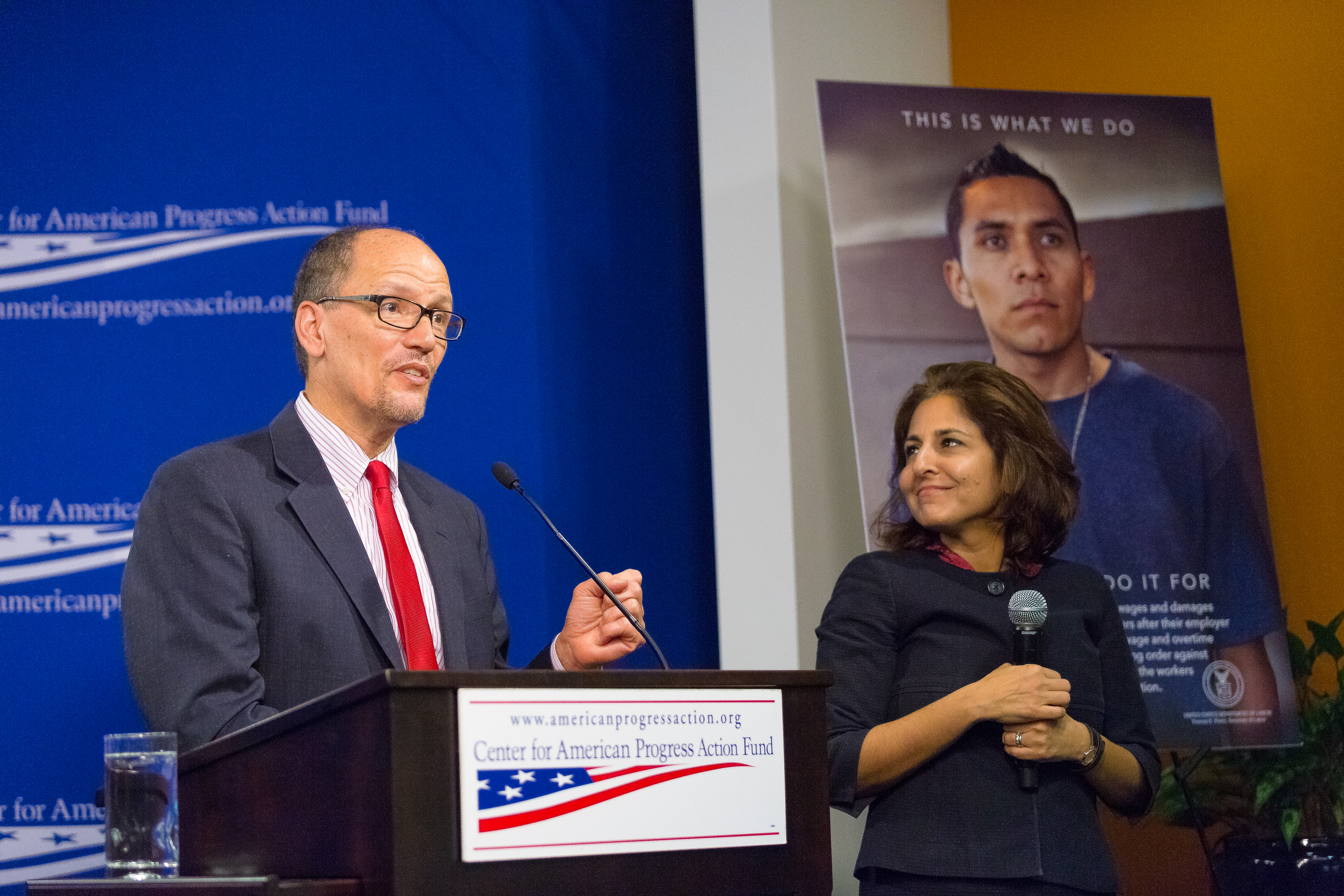
Tom Perez and Neera Tanden, December 2014

Launched in 2017, "The Moscow Project" is one of its initiatives, created, according to the Action Fund, to advocate for and work on the investigations of Donald Trump's ties to Russia. This initiative's website was archived in 2021.

=== Washington Center for Equitable Growth ===
The Washington Center for Equitable Growth, also known simply as "Equitable Growth", is a grantmaking and research organization founded in 2013 and "housed at the Center for American Progress". Equitable Growth funds academic research in economics and other social sciences, with a particular interest in government's role in the distribution of economic growth and the role of public perceptions of fairness in shaping government policy.

=== Disability Justice Initiative ===
In July 2018, the Center for American Progress recruited former Obama staffer and National Council on Disability executive director Rebecca Cokley to lead its new project focused on disability rights advocacy. Senator Tammy Duckworth spoke at the first event announcing creation of the new project, which is housed within CAP's Poverty to Prosperity Program. The Disability Justice Initiative became the first such project at a mainstream public policy advocacy organization not already focused on disability.

=== Project 2025 ===
The Center for American Progress is public in its opposition to the Heritage Foundation's political initiative "Project 2025," having released detailed critiques of the proposed policies. Advocates from CAP have referred to the initiative as "an extreme far-right agenda that will hurt all Americans" and "an authoritarian playbook". This criticism has continued after the 2024 presidential election of Donald Trump.

=== Biden administration ===
In 2023, CAP analysts were involved in drafting proposals for the Biden administration's economic agenda, focusing on areas such as supply chains and manufacturing.

== Policies ==
=== Health care ===
In 2017, CAP opposed Bernie Sanders' single-payer health plan. Critics said that this was because of funding from the health care industry, such as the Blue Cross Blue Shield Association, the Health Care Service Corporation and America's Health Insurance Plans, who would be eliminated under Sanders' plan. In 2018, the center proposed an alternative to single-payer that would offer patients and employers a choice between government coverage and private insurance.

In 2020, CAP president Neera Tanden came out in support of "universal health care". The organization has also proposed "Medicare Extra", which CAP says would add 35 million people to the insurance rolls while cutting U.S. health expenditures by over $300 billion annually.

== Criticism ==
=== Pro-UAE, pro-Saudi policy ===
In 2015, CAP received between $500,000 and $1 million in funding from the United Arab Emirates (UAE).

In October 2016, The Intercept reported that UAE Ambassador to the US Yousef Al Otaiba praised "a CAP report released [in October 2016] that advocates for continued cooperation with Gulf states like Saudi Arabia and the United Arab Emirates." In 2017, The Intercept reported that Brian Katulis, a Gulf expert at CAP, had worked with Otaiba "to help organize UAE-sponsored trips to the wealthy Gulf country for American think tank experts".

In January 2019, The Intercept further reported that CAP fired two staffers who were suspected of leaking an internal email exchange which staffers thought reflected improper influence by the UAE within the think tank, which involved discussions over the phrasing of CAP's response to the murder of The Washington Post columnist Jamal Khashoggi. CAP released a statement noting that while investigating the leaks, this was not the cause for the firings.

The UAE had previously been one of CAP's top donors; in January 2019, after the release of The Intercept's reporting, CAP announced they would no longer accept funding from the country. However, that December, it was reported that in the intervening eight months, the group had still been meeting with UAE lobbyists.

In 2021, CAP released a report, co-authored by Katulis, titled "Strategic Reengagement in the Middle East", which called for continued U.S. weapons sales to the UAE, Saudi Arabia, and Israel. Responsible Statecraft noted that the report "was largely authored and shaped by individuals with financial ties to Israel, the weapons industry, or the United Arab Emirates, running counter to the think tank's own efforts to distance itself from Gulf funding. None of these ties were disclosed as potential conflicts of interests by CAP or the report's authors."

=== Lack of transparency for funding sources ===
Some open government groups have criticized the center's failure to disclose its contributors, particularly because it was so influential to the Obama administration. CAP's website states that corporate donors are not allowed to remain anonymous. Nathan Robinson, writing in 2018 for Current Affairs wrote that CAP "continues to conceal the identities of many of its largest donors." He also criticized CAP for receiving "shady donations" and for a grant of $200,000 to the American Enterprise Institute, a conservative think tank, in 2018.

CAP has received significant funding from the Peter G. Peterson Foundation, a pro-austerity think tank associated with billionaire investment banker Peter G. Peterson.

=== Israel controversies ===
==== Allegations of anti-Israel language ====
CAP was criticized in 2012 by several Jewish organizations after two employees, Zaid Jilani and Ali Gharib, "publicly used language that could be construed as anti-Israel or even anti-Semitic". Bloggers associated with CAP published several posts using phrases such as "apartheid" and "Israel-firsters", which the American Jewish Committee described as "hateful" and called on CAP to disassociate themselves from these statements. The latter phrase, "Israel-firsters", which was used in reference to US supporters of Israel, was also criticized by the Anti-Defamation League and described as antisemitic, including by Faiz Shakir, then the vice president of CAP. Officials at CAP said the "inappropriate" language came only in personal tweets—not on CAP's website or its ThinkProgress blog. The Tweets were deleted, and the authors apologized.

==== Allegations of suppression of criticism of Israel ====
In 2015, however, other writers criticized CAP for what they saw as censorship of reasonable comments critical of Israeli settlements in the occupied West Bank and other policies. Based on leaked emails, columnist Glenn Greenwald, for example, wrote that CAP had deleted references to Israeli settlement policies in reports by their staffers.

Greenwald and others also criticized CAP for hosting a meeting with Israeli prime minister Benjamin Netanyahu. Greenwald described CAP's positions as "servitude to AIPAC and pandering to Netanyahu." Eighteen organizations and over one hundred academics signed an open letter, circulated by Jewish Voice for Peace and the Arab American Institute, against the meeting. 26,300 people signed a petition opposing the meeting.

=== WikiLeaks 2016 Hillary Clinton campaign controversy ===
After the release of the Podesta emails, the Center for American Progress was criticized for emails sent between John Halpin, a senior fellow at CAP, and Jennifer Palmieri, the communications director for Hillary Clinton's presidential campaign, in which they discussed Catholics and evangelicals. The Washington Post characterized the comments as "joking"; Kellyanne Conway and others called them anti-Catholic attacks.

=== Handling of sexual harassment accusations ===
In April 2018, BuzzFeed News reported that female employees of CAP had complained of sexual harassment by CAP employee Benton Strong to human resources and management. Two anonymous employees alleged retaliation for reporting Strong's behavior, one of them including her allegations in an exit memo when leaving CAP. However, CAP maintains that no retaliation occurred, and an internal investigation concluded the same. In response to the first complaint, Strong received a warning from CAP management. After the second complaint, he was suspended for three days without pay. He was already resigning to take up a position elsewhere, and these three days coincided with the final three days of his employment with CAP.

After the publication of the BuzzFeed story, CAP president Neera Tanden used the first name of one of the anonymous women during an all-staff meeting to address their handling of the sexual harassment allegations. A spokesperson told BuzzFeed that Tanden "unintentionally said the complainant’s first name in the meeting today, and immediately and profusely apologized for it."

=== Michael Bloomberg ===
In February 2020, The New York Times reported that CAP had removed reporting of New York City police surveillance of Muslim communities from a 2015 report, allegedly out of deference to Michael Bloomberg, who had given CAP grants worth $1.5 million. Yasmine Taeb, an author of the report, said that they were instructed to remove the chapter or make dramatic revisions, alleging this was "because of how it was going to be perceived by Mayor Bloomberg." CAP officials disputed her account, characterizing the changes as editorial decisions: detailed discussion of NYC policing was off-topic because the report had been "commissioned to examine right-wing groups targeting Muslims with explicit bigotry and conspiracy theories." Bloomberg told The New York Times reporters he was unaware of any such dispute at CAP; in 2017, he contributed an additional $400,000.

== Funding ==
The Center for American Progress is a 501(c)(3) organization under the US Internal Revenue Code. In 2014, CAP received $45 million from a variety of sources, including individuals, foundations, labor unions, and corporations. From 2003 to 2007, CAP received about $15 million in grants from 58 foundations. Major individual donors include George Soros, Peter Lewis, Steve Bing, and Herb and Marion Sandler. The center receives undisclosed sums from corporate donors. In December 2013, the organization released a list of its corporate donors, which include Walmart, CitiGroup, Wells Fargo, defense contractor Northrop Grumman, America's Health Insurance Plans, and Eli Lilly and Company.

In 2015, CAP released a partial list of its donors, which included 28 anonymous donors accounting for at least $5 million in contributions. Named donors included the Bill and Melinda Gates Foundation and the Embassy of the United Arab Emirates, each giving between $500,000 and $999,999. CAP's top donors include Walmart and Citigroup, each of which has given between $100,000 and $499,000. Other large CAP donors include Goldman Sachs, Bank of America, Google, Time Warner, and Pharmaceutical Research and Manufacturers of America.

As of 2024, corporate donors to CAP included Google, Apple and NBC Universal.

*2015 donors (excluding anonymous)	Level
Ford Foundation	$1,000,000+
The Hutchins Family Foundation	$1,000,000+
Sandler Foundation	$1,000,000+
TomKat Charitable Trust	$1,000,000+
Bill and Melinda Gates Foundation	$500,000 to $999,999
Joyce Foundation	$500,000 to $999,999
Not on Our Watch	$500,000 to $999,999
Open Square Charitable Gift Fund	$500,000 to $999,999
Embassy of United Arab Emirates	$500,000 to $999,999
Walton Family Foundation	$500,000 to $999,999
The William and Flora Hewlett Foundation	$500,000 to $999,999

== See also ==
- Policy Network
