= Bonhams & Butterfields =

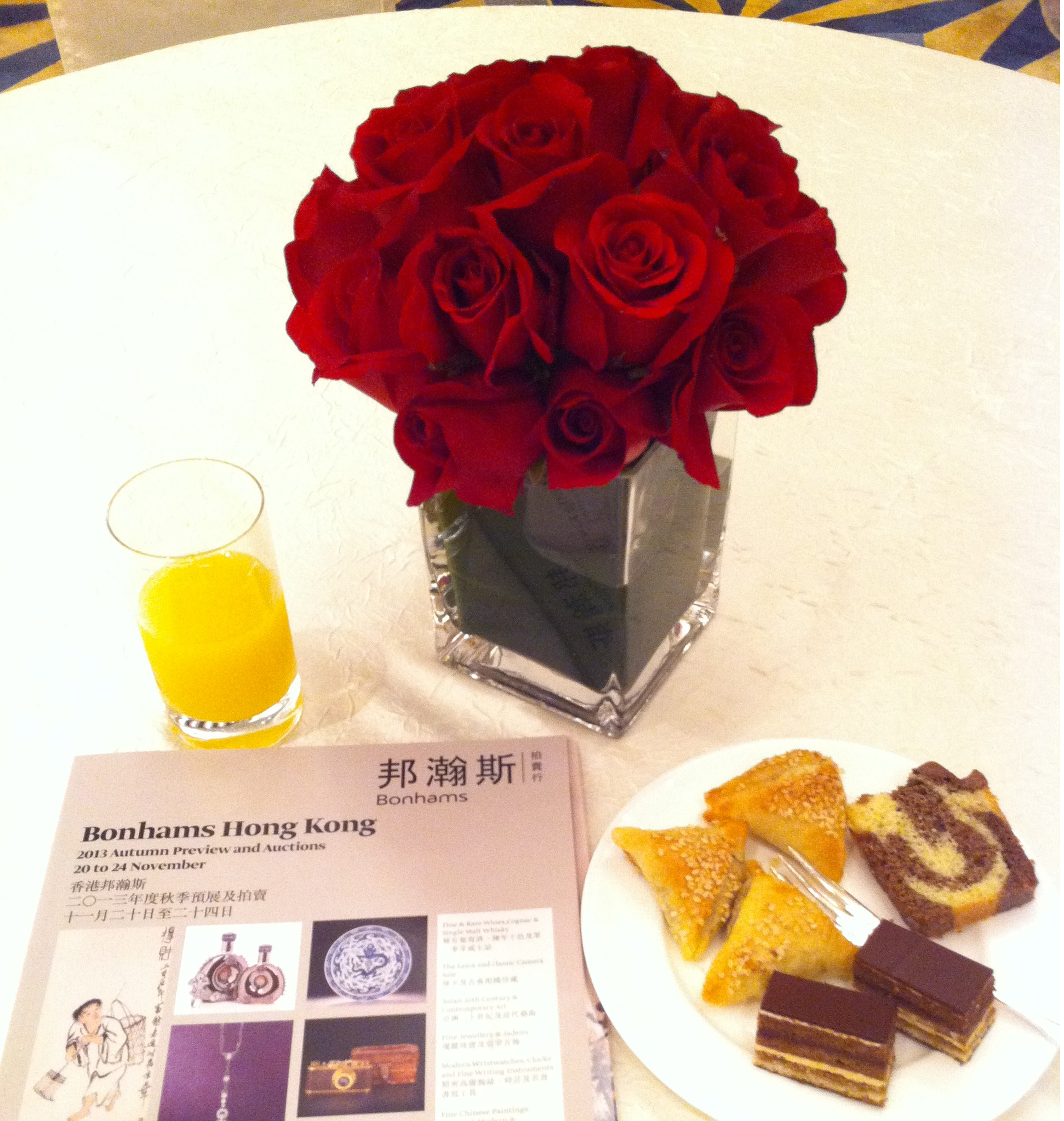
Bonhams is developing business in Hong Kong, China

Bonhams and Butterfield was a large American auction house, founded in 1865 by William Butterfield in San Francisco.

It was purchased in 1999 from Bernard Osher by online auctioneer eBay for $260 million.

In 2002, it was acquired from eBay by British auctioneer Bonhams and operated under the name Bonhams & Butterfields for about ten years. It now just goes by Bonhams.

== History ==
Butterfield & Butterfield was founded in San Francisco in 1865 by William Butterfield, a former Nevada County sheriff who began by auctioning goods from ships arriving in San Francisco Bay to serve the fortunes generated by the Gold Rush. The auction house quickly grew a reputation for handling estate goods, consignments, and distinctive Gold Rush-era artifacts, and became an important player in San Francisco's art and antiques market.

William Butterfield's son Fred joined the firm after his father's death, and his grandson Reeder Butterfield later played an important role in the company's expansion. As the West Coast and its collecting markets evolved, Butterfield & Butterfield introduced specialist departments in areas such as fine art, jewelry, Western Americana, and decorative arts. The house became known for auctions of major California estates and for its role in selling high-profile collections, including works of art, estate furnishings, and Gold Rush memorabilia.

In 1970, businessman and art collector Bernard Osher acquired Butterfield & Butterfield. Under Osher's ownership, the company expanded its expertise, departmental organization, and reputation, opening a Los Angeles saleroom in 1988 and further developing its national and international reach. Butterfield & Butterfield implemented technological innovations such as online bidding and real-time remote participation in auctions during the late 1990s.

The company was acquired by eBay in 1999 for approximately $260 million. The partnership brought Butterfield's specialist teams and appraisal services to eBay, though the blend of high-end offline and internet auctioning presented operational challenges. In 2002, Butterfield & Butterfield was purchased by London-based Bonhams, which integrated the firm into its global saleroom network, operating for a time under the name Bonhams & Butterfields and expanding Bonhams’ presence on the U.S. West Coast.
