= Bernard Osher =

American businessman

- Born: 1927 (age 98–99)
- Education: B.A. Bowdoin College
- Occupations: Businessman philanthropist
- Spouse: Barbro Sachs-Osher
- Parent(s): Samuel and Leah Osher
- Family: Marion Sandler (sister)

Bernard Osher (born 1927) is an American businessman, best known for his work as a philanthropist.

== Early life and education ==
Osher was born to a Jewish family and raised in Biddeford, Maine. In 1948, he graduated with a B.A. from Bowdoin College.

=== Career ===
Osher began his career in southern Maine, owning and running the family's hardware store on Main Street in Biddeford. He briefly worked at Oppenheimer & Company in New York, before moving to California, where he became a founding director of World Savings, which became the second largest savings institution in the United States. An avid art collector, Osher purchased the auction house, Butterfield & Butterfield, which became the fourth-largest auction house in the world. In 1999, he sold the company to eBay.

In 2005, Forbes listed him as the 584th richest man in the world, and in 2006, 746th. Also, in the November 26, 2007 issue of Businessweek, he was listed as the 11th most generous philanthropist.

== Philanthropy ==
Osher has been a notable philanthropist since 1977 when he founded the Bernard Osher Foundation. The foundation is a major supporter of higher education and the arts, and Osher has consequently become known as "the quiet philanthropist." An initiative of the foundation has funded over 120 Osher Lifelong Learning Institutes at universities and colleges in the United States since 2001.

Since founding the Bernard Osher Foundation, nearly 80 percent of its grants have gone to support educational programs, and seventeen percent support arts organizations. His donations have gone towards causes such as scholarships for higher education through the Osher Fellows Program, and Scholarships for University Reentry Students aged 25 to 50 under his Osher Reentry Scholarship Program. Other causes include supporting programs addressing the educational needs of seasoned adults at institutions of higher education under the Osher Lifelong Learning Institutes, Selected integrative medicine programs, and Arts and educational programs in the Greater San Francisco Bay Area and the State of Maine. $70 million in scholarships are given to California community college students, and $16 million worth of scholarships to the University of California at Berkeley's Incentive Awards Program, which helps poor students attend the university.

In 2006, the Bernard Osher Foundation donated $723.2 million in support of these and other programs, resulting in the creation of new programs at several institutions in the United States that promote lifelong learning. This donation earned him the designation as The Chronicle of Philanthropy's third most generous donor in their annual survey of the largest donors in America.

Osher plans to give away his entire fortune, as he has no heirs, but he enjoys the opportunity of helping members of several generations lead more fulfilling lives by his contributions.

== Personal life ==
He is married to Barbro Sachs-Osher. His sister was the late Marion Sandler.

== Awards ==
Osher was awarded an honorary doctorate degree by Carnegie Mellon University in 2017.

Osher was also awarded an Honorary Doctor of Humane Letters from the University of Massachusetts Boston in 2015.
