= American Asthma Foundation =

- Abbreviation: AAF
- Headquarters: San Francisco, California, U.S.
- Website: www.americanasthmafoundation.org

The American Asthma Foundation (AAF) was a non-profit grant program that funds basic research focused on asthma. Its stated mission is to improve treatments for, prevent, and find a cure for asthma. Established in 1999, it is the largest private funder of asthma research, having awarded over $110,000,000 in grant funds to 182 scientists. It suspended its operations in 2019.

== Funding Strategy ==
The American Asthma Foundation employed an unusual strategy to advance basic research in asthma: nearly all AAF grant funding has supported scientists who never before studied asthma. The concept was to recruit outstanding investigators from other fields in order to bring fresh perspectives and research advances other fields to the study of asthma.

== Scientific Review Board ==
The AAF is guided by a scientific review board, which selects the research projects that are funded by the AAF. The board represents a broad range of scientific disciplines and is composed largely of scientists outside the field of asthma research.

== Grant Program ==
After 20 years of funding basic research in asthma, the American Asthma Foundation suspended funding for new grants in 2019.
