= Golden West Financial =

One of the largest U.S. Savings and Loan associations (1929-2006)

- Company type: Public
- Traded as: NYSE: GDW
- Industry: Financial services
- Predecessors: Golden West Savings and Loan Association (founded 1929); World Savings and Loan Association (founded 1912)
- Founded: 1963; 63 years ago in Oakland, California
- Founder: Herbert and Marion Sandler
- Defunct: 2006; 20 years ago
- Fate: acquired by Wachovia
- Successor: Wachovia
- Headquarters: Oakland, California, US
- Number of locations: 283 (2005)
- Area served: Arizona, California, Colorado, Florida, Illinois, Kansas, Nevada, New Jersey, New York, and Texas
- Net income: $1.5 billion
- Total assets: $124.6 billion
- Number of employees: 11604
- Subsidiaries: Atlas Securities; World Savings and Loan
- Website: goldenwestworld.com

Golden West Financial was the second-largest savings and loan association in the United States, operating branches under the name of World Savings Bank.

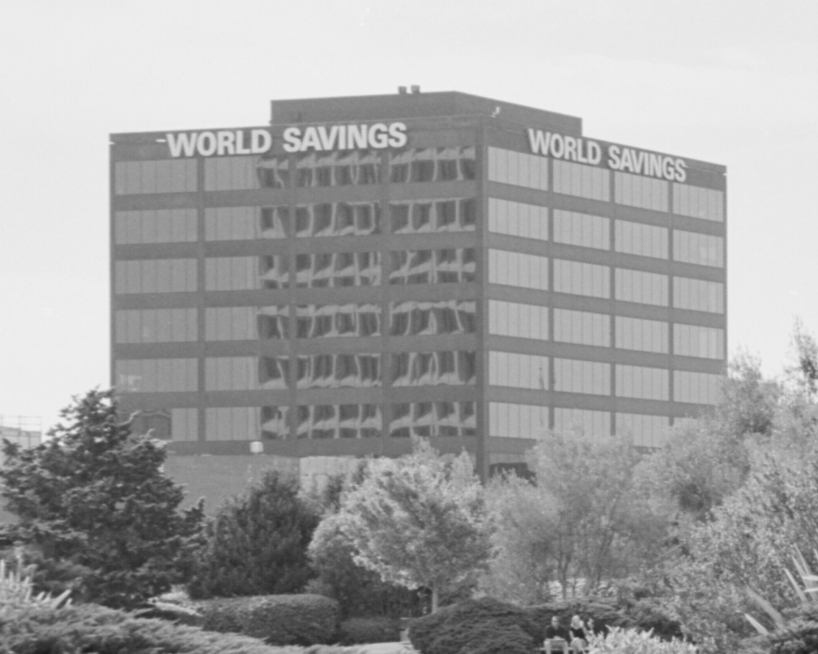
Former headquarters of World Savings Bank in Oakland, CA.

== History ==
The business was founded in 1929 as Golden West Savings and Loan Association, a small savings and loan in Oakland, California. Golden West Financial's subsidiary, World Savings, was established in Madera, California, in 1912.

=== Golden West Financial ===
Golden West Savings and Loan Association was purchased in 1963 for $4 million by Herbert Sandler and Marion Sandler, through their newly created corporation, Golden West Financial. Some of the capital for the acquisition came from bank loans, with the balance coming from Marion's family money. Marion Sandler, a former Wall Street analyst, and Herbert, a real estate attorney, would operate the company in tandem. In 1968, the Sandlers took Golden West Financial public. In 1969, Modesto Savings was acquired and became part of Golden West Savings.

=== Growth in the 1970s and 1980s ===
The expanding popularity of savings and loan corporations in the 1970s led the Sandlers to acquire World Savings in 1975. World Savings had been growing with other mergers in Colorado, so this acquisition expanded Golden West Financial out of California and 107 offices. The corporation began operating all of its savings and loans offices under the name World Savings.

Lessening restrictions on savings and loans by the United States government in the early 1980s saw a rapid growth in the industry, and Golden West profited from it by careful examination of the market as it fluctuated and not over-extending its reach during the savings and loan crisis. Golden West continued to expand its portfolio, and remained marginally profitable for its investors.

=== The 1990s and 2000s ===
Marion and Herbert Sandler continued to serve as co-CEOs, with Marion overseeing the operations and Herbert working on the lending practices side. In 1990, The New York Times called the company "the Nation's Best-Run S.& L." saying that "the core of their business is decidedly—some might say refreshingly—old-fashioned". As the mortgage market revived in the mid-1990s, Golden West Financial Corporation expanded its reach to the east coast of the United States as struggling savings and loan associations were put up for sale. By 1995, Golden West held $31 billion in assets, making it the third largest mortgage lender in the country. In 1997, Catalyst, a nonprofit women's research group, found that Golden West Financial had one of the highest percentages of women on their board of directors within any Fortune 500 company, with 5 women and 4 men.

At the same time, the United States government set up Freddie Mac to provide assistance for first time or low income home buyers who may not have received assistance from the private banking system. With diligence, Herbert Sandler devised an adjustable-rate mortgage system for Golden West's holdings to provide as alternative to the other options available. The system and implementation was enormously successful.

In 2000, the bank was one of the highest-rated stocks in the industry. Golden West was mentioned industry-wide in a positive light, once described as "They are in a sweet spot right now in the mortgage business, and that is driving extraordinary earnings compared to other thrifts. They are the best ARM lender, and they have superior interest rate management". As with the late 1980s and early 1990s, Golden West continued to expand assets and lending opportunities during the market decline after a burst of refinancing.

In 2006, Golden West Financial was named the "Most Admired Company" in the mortgage services business by Fortune magazine. By the time Wachovia announced its acquisition in 2006, Golden West Financial had over $125 billion in assets and 11,600 employees.

== Takeover by Wachovia ==
The Sandlers, who had run the company for forty-three years, were ready to retire and focus on philanthropy.

In 2006, they agreed to acquisition of Golden West Financial and its thrift, World Savings, by Wachovia Bank, The acquisition gave Wachovia an additional 285-branch network spanning 10 states. Wachovia greatly raised its profile in California, where Golden West held $32 billion in deposits and operated 123 branches. Wachovia also picked up about $122 billion in option adjustable rate mortgages.

The acquisition was announced on May 7, 2006, with a price of a little under $25.5 billion. The merger was completed in October 2006.

The subprime mortgage crisis caused the timing of the acquisition by Wachovia to harm that company's financial situation. World Savings lending volume dipped again in 2006 shortly after the sale to Wachovia was initiated. This prompted World Savings to attract more borrowers by taking a step which the company had been resisting for years: it began to write loans at an annual interest rate of just 1%, with correspondingly low monthly payments. World Savings previously did not allow rates so low. The steep losses generated by these Golden West/World Savings loans ended up crippling Wachovia, resulting in its eventual purchase by Wells Fargo in 2008.

== In popular media ==
While World Savings continued to scrutinize borrowers' ability to manage increased payments, the move to rock-bottom rates lured customers whose financial reliability was harder to verify.

Wachovia CEO G. Kennedy "Ken" Thompson described Golden West as a "crown jewel". But investors did not react positively to the deal.

After the takeover was completed in 2006, some analysts said that Wachovia purchased Golden West at the peak of the US housing boom, and that its mortgage-related problems were the ultimate factor in Wachovia's fall.

The October 4, 2008 episode of Saturday Night Live lampooned the Wachovia takeover of Golden West Financial during a segment on the financial bailout. Darrell Hammond, as Herb Sandler, states that "My wife and I had a company which aggressively marketed subprime mortgages, and then bundled them as securities to sell to banks such as Wachovia. Today, our portfolio's worth almost nothing, though, at one point, it was worth close to $19 billion." In response to the show, the real Herb Sandler said he had been "listening to this crap for two years" and "we are being unfairly tarred."
