= Etiquette in Japan =

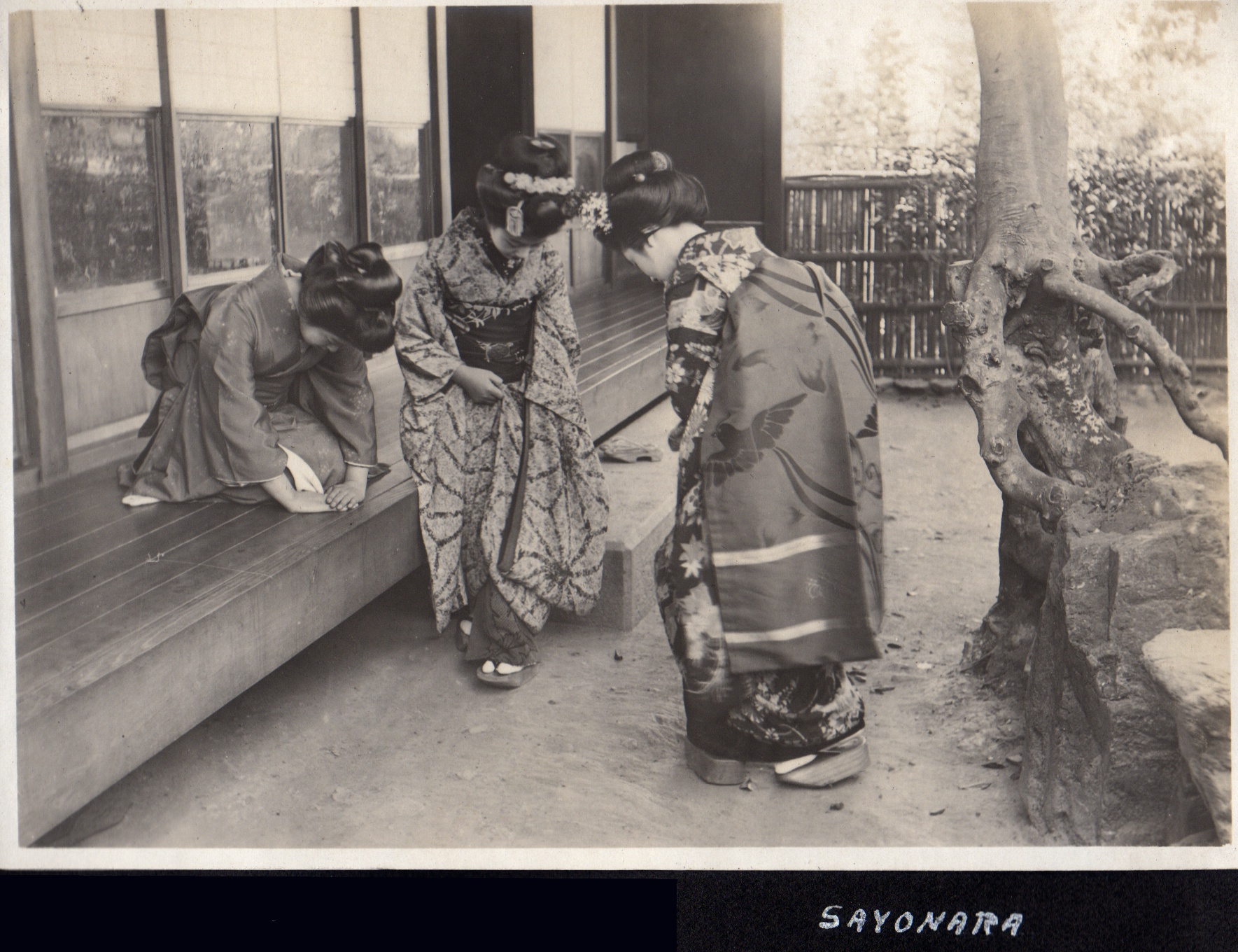

Etiquette in Japan forms common societal expectations of social behavior practiced throughout the nation of Japan. The etiquette of Japan has changed greatly over the millennia as different civilizations influenced its culture. Modern Japanese etiquette has a strong influence from that of China and the Western world, but retains many of its unique traditional elements.

== Bathing ==
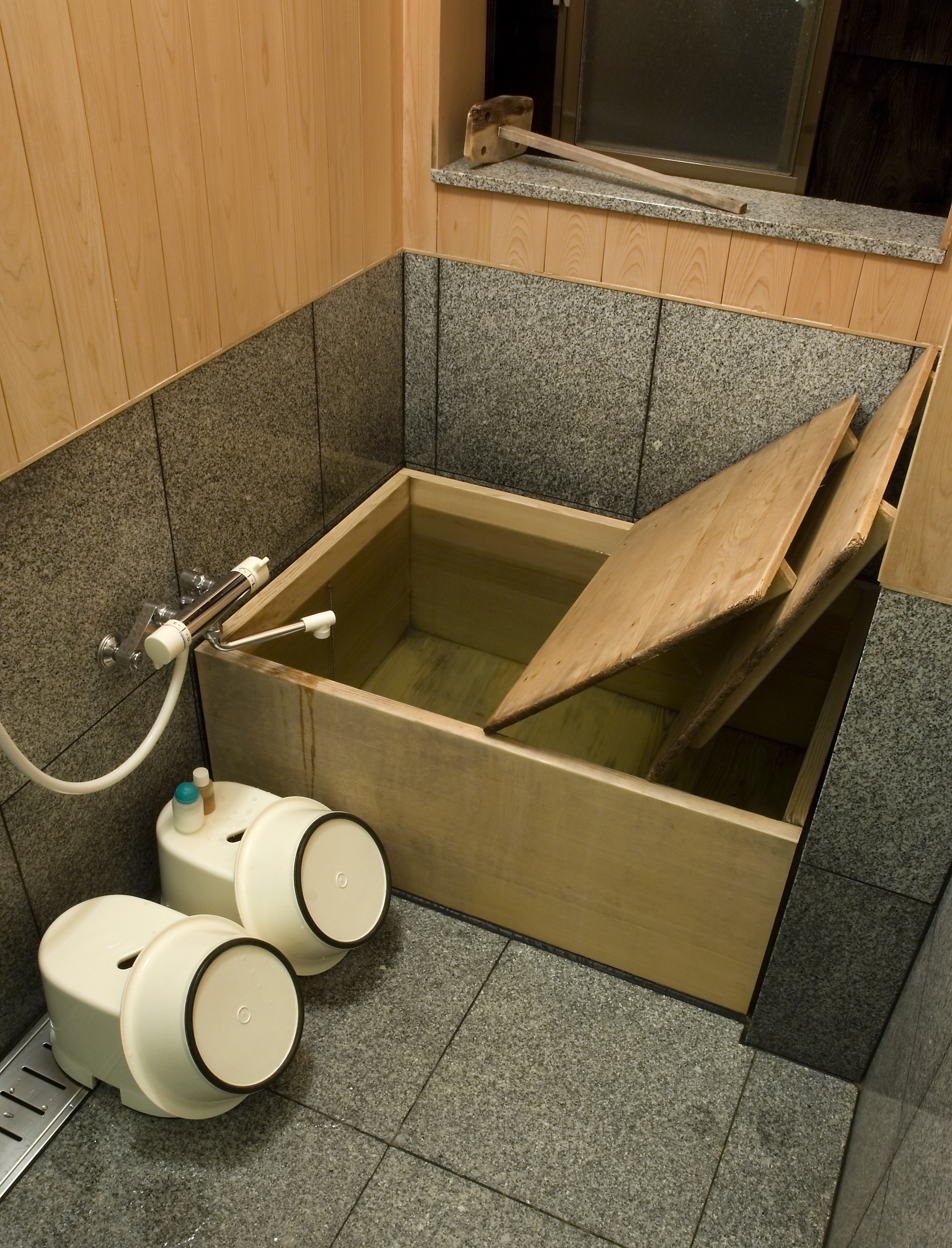
A private furo in a ryokan

Bathing is an important part of the daily routine in Japan, where bath tubs are for relaxing, not cleaning the body. Therefore, the body must be cleaned and scrubbed before entering the bathtub or ofuro. This is done in the same room as the tub, while seated on a small stool and using a hand-held shower. Soap, a wash cloth, and shampoo are provided, and the bather is expected to wash and rinse thoroughly twice before stepping into the ofuro. It is very important that no soap residue be transferred to the ofuro because the heated water is not drained after each person's use, and several hours (and the expense of a considerable amount of water) are required to heat fresh water. Any hair or debris is scooped from the water after the bath, and a lid is placed over the tub to maintain the water temperature and prevent evaporation. Water heaters also continue to maintain the temperature.

Ryokan baths have a small anteroom for undressing before entering the bathing room. Usually there is a basket in which to place used towels and wash cloths.

In a home or small inn, a traditional tub is square and deep enough that the water covers the bather's shoulders, but its length and width are small so the bather sits with the knees drawn up. A scoop is provided so the bather can douse their head with the tub water. Because the ofuro is meant for a relaxing private soak, yet serves numerous people, the bather needs to be careful not to indulge too long. Many ryokan close the ofuro for several hours every day so the room can be cleaned and aired, and some require guests to sign up for specific soak times.

In homes with small tubs, family members bathe one by one in order of seniority, traditionally starting with the oldest male or the oldest person in the household. If there are guests in the home, they will be given priority. In homes with larger tubs, it is not uncommon for family members to bathe together. Typically one or both parents will bathe with babies and toddlers, and even as children grow older they may still bathe with one of their parents. Some homes transfer the hot bath water to a clothes-washing machine.

Bathtubs are increasingly common in modern Japanese homes; however, in cities there are still many small and old apartments that do not have bathtubs, so public bathhouses called sentō are common. A regular bathhouse will have tap water heated in a boiler. In all but the most rural areas, public baths are segregated by gender. Customers bathe nude, many using a small washcloth to cover their genitals. Hotels, pachinko parlors and other venues may have on-site sentō for customer use. The same soaping, scrubbing, and rinsing rules apply as in homes and ryokan.

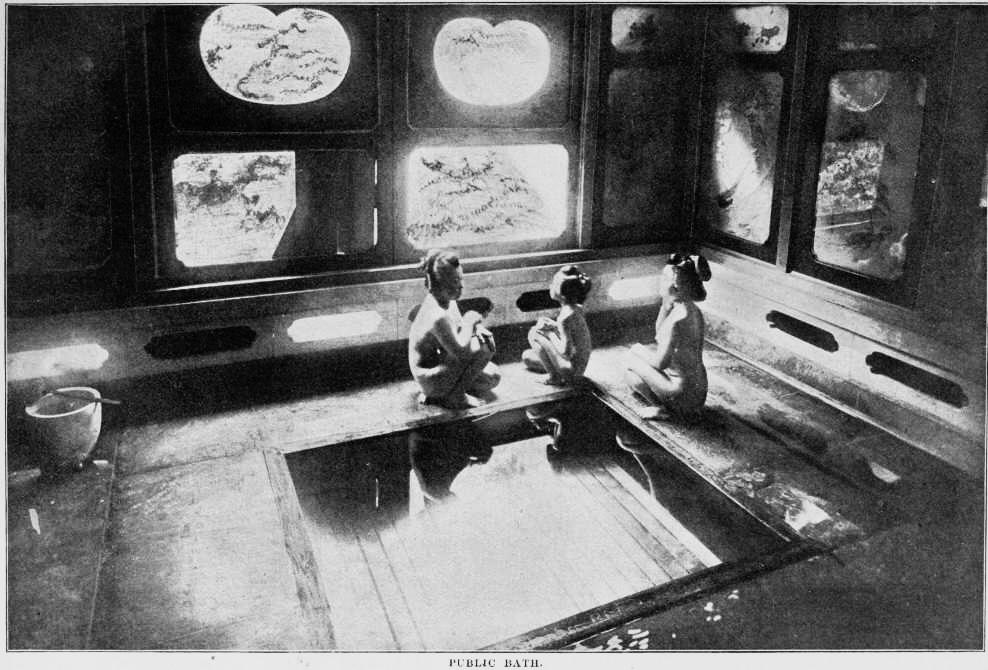
1901 image of a sentō

An onsen (温泉) is a Japanese hot spring. These baths use water heated by geothermal springs and often are incorporated into resort-like destinations in the countryside where people stay for a day or more. They may have a variety of soaking pools and tubs, some indoors and some outdoors, some communal and some private. Larger onsen will have separate pools for men and women, and visitors normally bathe nude.

Many sentō and onsen ban customers with tattoos, which are traditionally taboo, citing concerns over yakuza activity.

== Bowing ==
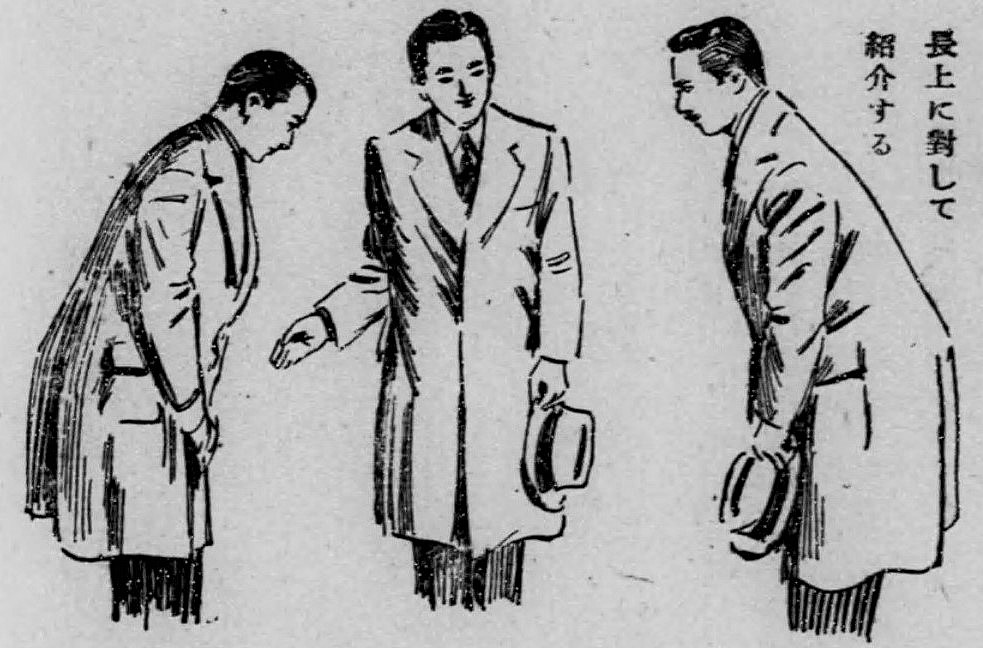
Bowing

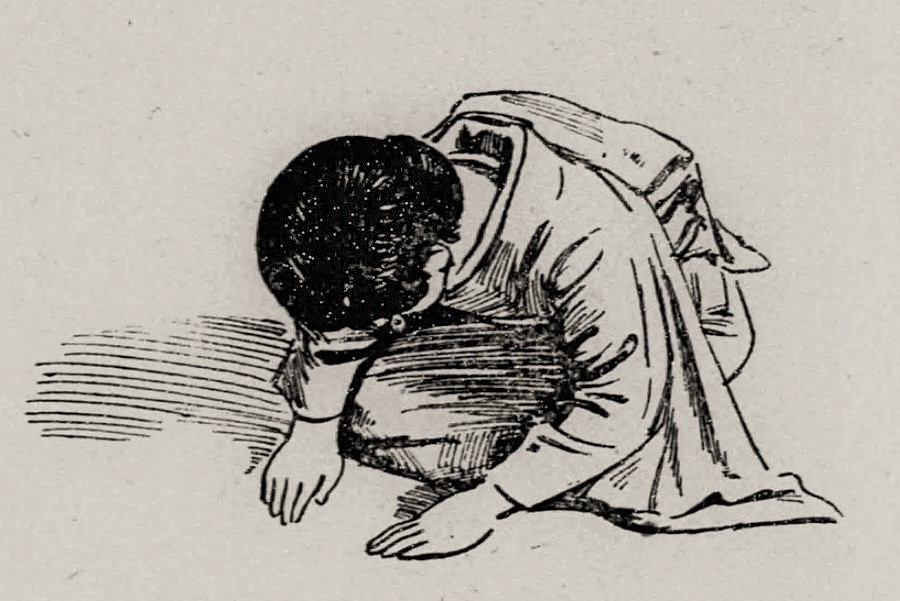
Bowing in the tatami room

Bowing (お辞儀, o-jigi) is probably the feature of Japanese etiquette that is best known outside Japan. Bowing is extremely important: although children normally begin learning how to bow at a very young age, companies commonly train their employees precisely how they are to bow.

Basic bows are performed by bending from the waist with the back and neck straight, hands at the sides (males) or clasped at the lap (females), and eyes looking down. The body is composed but not rigid. Generally, the longer and deeper the bow, the stronger the emotion and respect expressed.

The three main types of bows are informal, formal, and very formal. Informal bows are made at about a fifteen-degree angle or just tilt over one's head to the front, and more formal bows at about thirty degrees. Very formal bows are deeper.

The etiquette surrounding bowing, including the length, depth, and appropriate response, is exceedingly complex. For example, if one person maintains their bow longer than the other person expected (generally about two or three seconds), the person who rose first may express politeness by bowing a second time—and then receive another bow in response. This often leads to a long exchange of progressively lighter bows.

Generally, one who is considered lower ranking in Japanese society bows longer, more deeply, and more frequently than one of a higher rank. A higher ranked person addressing a lower ranked person will generally only nod slightly, and some may not bow at all. A lower ranked person will bend forward from the waist. It is important to try to gauge the appropriate depth and duration of bows in different situations: a bow that is too deep or too long for the situation can be interpreted as sarcasm.

Bows of apology tend to be deeper and last longer, occurring with frequency throughout the apology, generally at about 45 degrees with the head lowered and lasting for at least the count of three, sometimes longer. The depth, frequency, and duration of the bow increases with the sincerity of the apology and severity of the offense. Occasionally, in the case of apology and begging, people crouch to show absolute submission or extreme regret. This is called dogeza. Even though dogeza was previously considered very formal, today it is mostly regarded as contempt for oneself, so it is not used in everyday settings.

Bows of thanks follow the same pattern. In extreme cases a kneeling bow is performed; this bow is sometimes so deep that the forehead touches the floor. This is called lit. 'most respectful bow' (最敬礼, saikeirei).

When dealing with non-Japanese people, many Japanese will shake hands. Since many non-Japanese are familiar with the custom of bowing, this often leads to a combined bow and handshake which can become complicated. Bows may be combined with handshakes or performed before or after shaking hands. Generally when bowing in close proximity, as necessitated when combining bowing and shaking hands, people turn slightly to one side (usually the left) to avoid bumping heads.

== Making payment ==
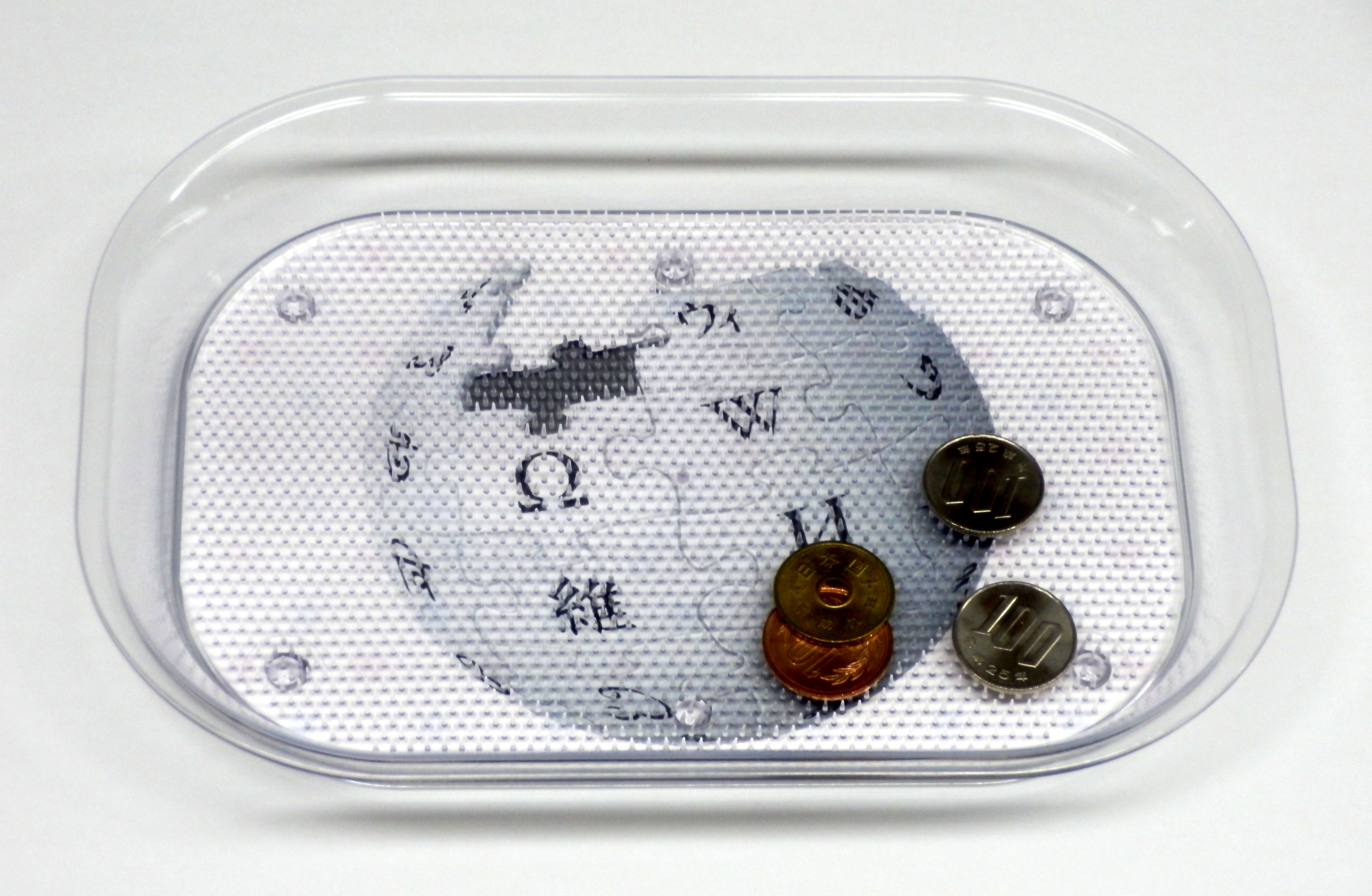
A coin tray (Japanese: カルトン, Hepburn: karuton) decorated with the 2003 Wikipedia logo.

It is common for Japanese businesses to set out a small tray near a cash register so customers can place their money on the tray rather than handing it directly to the cashier. If a business provides such a tray, it is a breach of etiquette to disregard it and instead hold out the money for the cashier to take by hand.

Tipping, is not a custom in Japan, but may exist as an fixed service charge or built into the product price.

== Eating and drinking ==
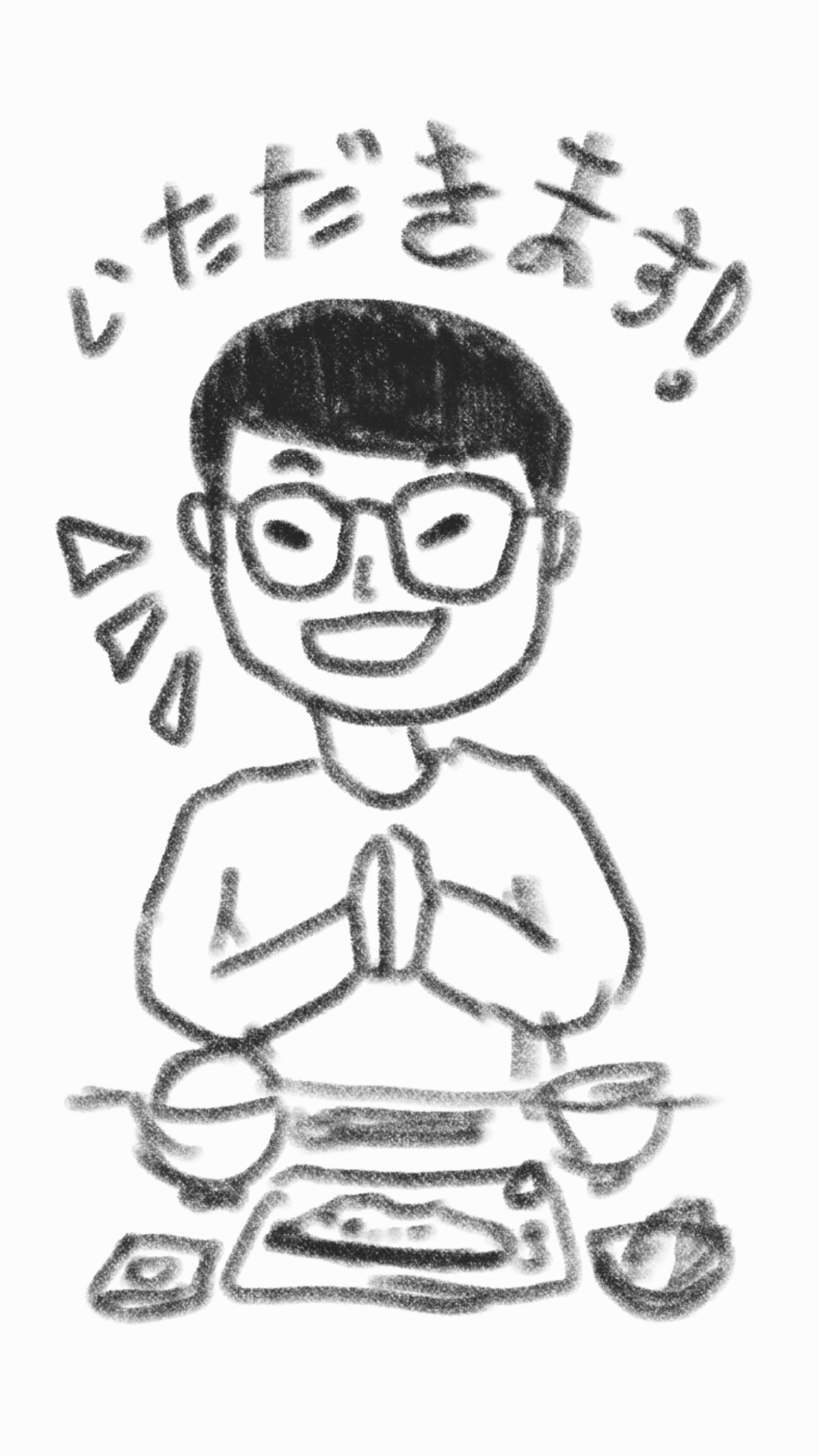
A boy saying "itadakimasu" before eating, which is common practice according to Japanese etiquette

Meals in Japan traditionally begin with the word itadakimasu (いただきます, lit. 'I humbly receive'). Similar to bon appétit or saying grace, it expresses gratitude for all who played a role in providing the food, including farmers, as well as the living organisms that gave their life to become part of the meal. Saying itadakimasu before a meal has been described as both a secular and a religious practice.

Upon finishing a meal, the Japanese use the polite phrase gochisōsama-deshita (ごちそうさまでした, lit. 'that was (the condition of) an (honorable) feast'). In response, the preparer often says osomatsusama-deshita (おそまつさまでした, lit. 'I think that meal was not feast').

It is not rude to have leftovers on the plate, as it is taken as a signal to the host that one wishes to be served another helping. Conversely, finishing one's meal completely, especially the rice, indicates that one is satisfied and therefore does not wish to be served any more. Children are especially encouraged to eat every last grain of rice (see also mottainai as Buddhist philosophy). It is impolite to pick out certain ingredients and leave the rest. It is expected to chew with the mouth closed.

It is acceptable to lift soup and rice bowls to the mouth so one does not spill food. Miso soup is drunk directly from its (small) bowl. Larger soups and those with chunky ingredients such as ramen may come with a spoon to be used in conjunction with chopsticks. Noodles from hot soup are often blown on (once lifted from the soup) to cool them before eating; and it is appropriate to slurp certain foods, especially ramen or soba noodles. However, slurping may not be practiced universally, and Western-style noodles (pasta) may adhere to this exception.

It is uncommon for Japanese people to eat or drink while walking in public. Drink vending machines in Japan generally have a recycling bin for used bottles and cans, so one can consume the drink there; and in summer months one may see groups drinking near a vending machine. Some consider it rude to eat in public, but this is not a universally held aversion.

In Japanese restaurants, customers are given a rolled hand towel called oshibori. It is considered rude to use the towel to wipe the face or neck; however, some people, usually men, do this at more informal restaurants. Non-woven towelettes are replacing the cloth oshibori.

In any situation, an uncertain diner can observe what others are doing; for non-Japanese people to ask how to do something properly is also generally received with appreciation for the acknowledgment of cultural differences and expression of interest in learning Japanese ways.

=== Chopsticks ===
Chopsticks (はし, hashi) have been used in Japan since the Nara period (710–794). There are many traditions and unwritten rules surrounding the use of chopsticks. For example, it is considered particularly taboo to pass food from chopsticks to chopsticks, as this is how bones are handled by the family of the deceased after a cremation. If one must pass food to someone else during a meal (a questionable practice in public), the person picks up the food by reversing the chopsticks to use the end which were not in direct contact with the handler's mouth, and place it on a small plate, allowing the recipient to retrieve it (with the recipient's own chopsticks). If no other utensils are available while sharing plates of food, the ends of the chopsticks are used to retrieve the shared food. Mismatched chopsticks are not used. Standing chopsticks vertically in a bowl of rice is avoided, as it recalls burning incense sticks standing up in sand, typically at funerals; the act of stabbing the chopsticks into the food resembles an action devout Buddhists perform when offering ceremonial food to their ancestors at the household shrine. Placing chopsticks so that they point at someone else is considered a symbolic threat.

Many Japanese restaurants provide diners with single-use wooden/bamboo chopsticks that are snapped apart near their tops (which are thicker than the bottoms). As a result, the attachment area may produce small splinters. Rubbing chopsticks together to remove splinters is considered impolite, implying that one thinks the utensils are cheap.

== Visiting other people's houses ==
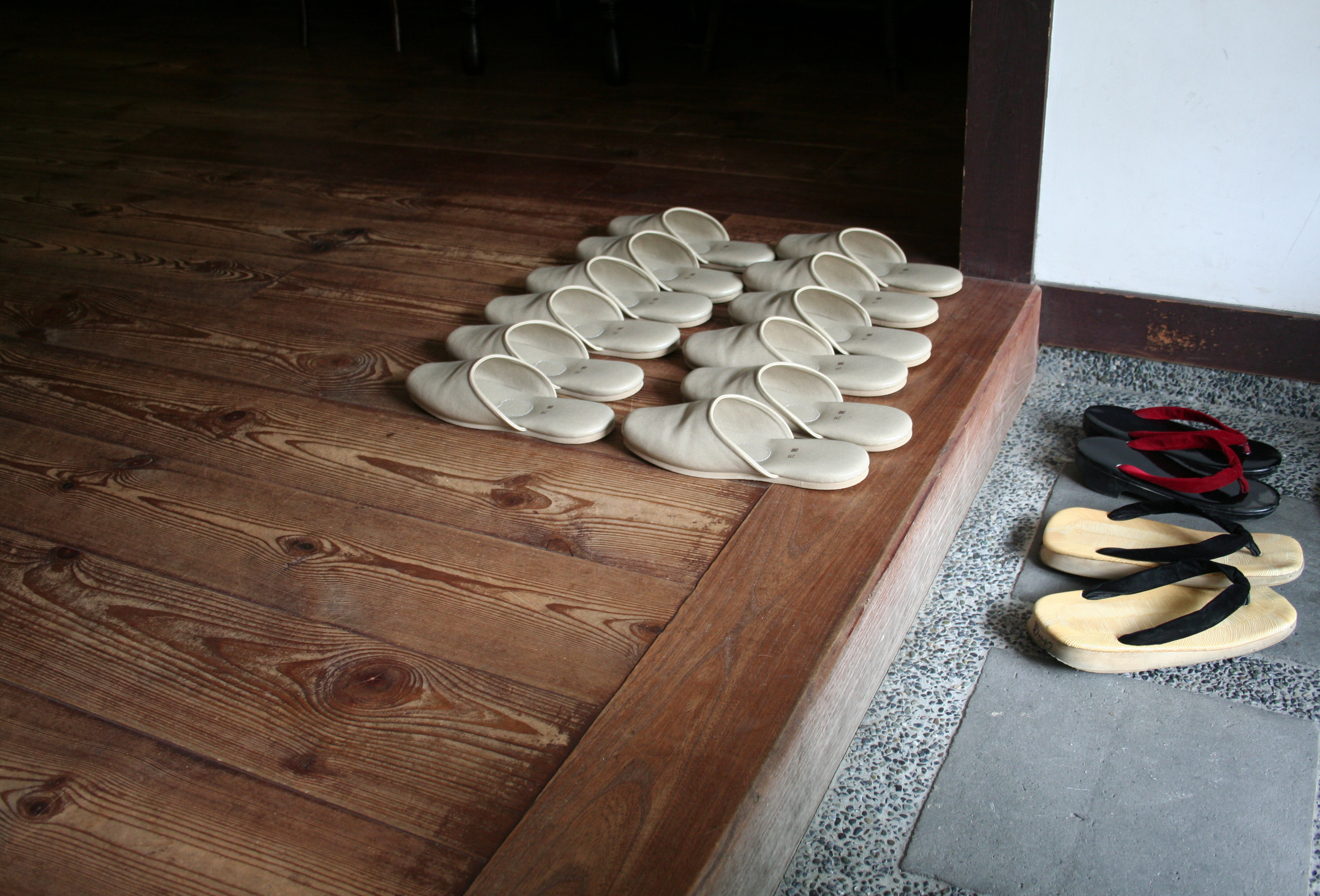
Wooden step into a Japanese hotel, where a person takes off shoes and wears the house slippers provided

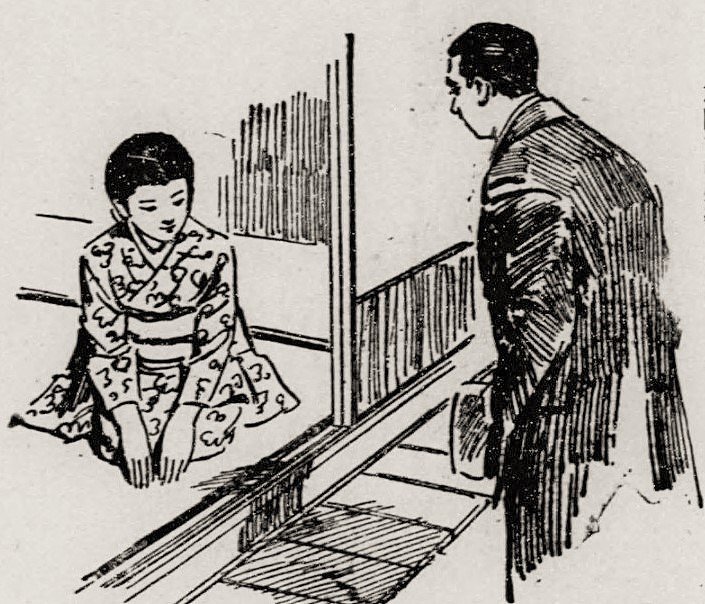
At the entrance

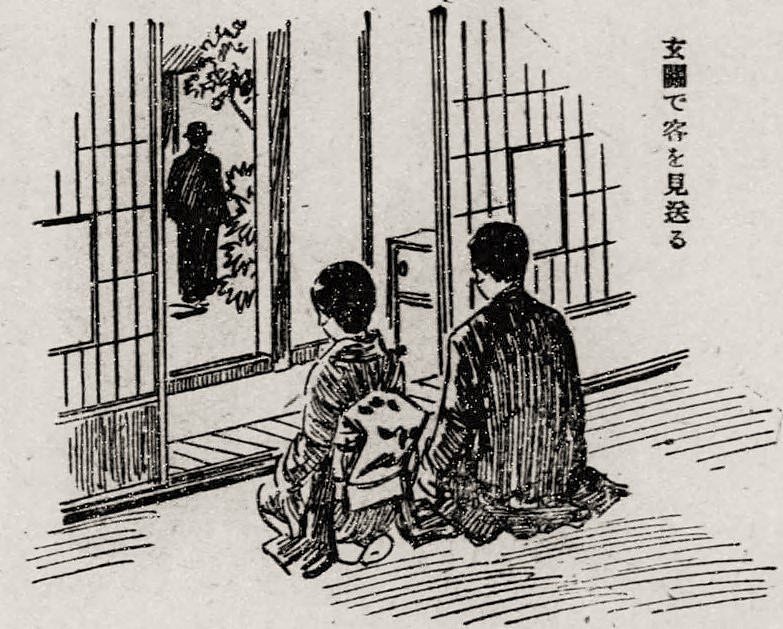
Seeing guests off

It is considered an honor to be invited to someone's home in Japan. Many Japanese regard their homes as being too humble to entertain guests. Shoes are never worn inside the home – this ensures that the floor is not stained by soil, sand or dust that may be attached to the soles. Instead, shoes are removed in the genkan (mudroom or entrance foyer), and often replaced with slippers called uwabaki. Just wearing socks is also acceptable in informal situations. Genkan are found in even small apartments, where they are correspondingly small, and feature a small step up. Socks, however, are not generally removed – bare feet are acceptable when visiting a close friend, but not otherwise. There are also separate slippers used when using a bathroom, for reasons of hygiene. Slippers are not worn on tatami (traditional Japanese floor mats), as doing so may wear the mats out.

Wooden geta are provided for short walks outside when entering the house. It is generally considered polite to wear shoes instead of sandals, but sandal wearers may carry a pair of white socks to put over their bare feet or stockings, so that their bare feet will not touch the slippers that the host offers, or they may use tabi socks, worn with the sandals. The shoes are turned around so that the toe faces the door after taking them off. During the winter time, if a guest is wearing a coat or hat, the guest will remove the coat or hat before the host opens the door. When the guest is leaving, they do not put on the coat or hat until the door has closed.

Regarding seating arrangements, see kamiza.

== Gifts and gift-giving ==
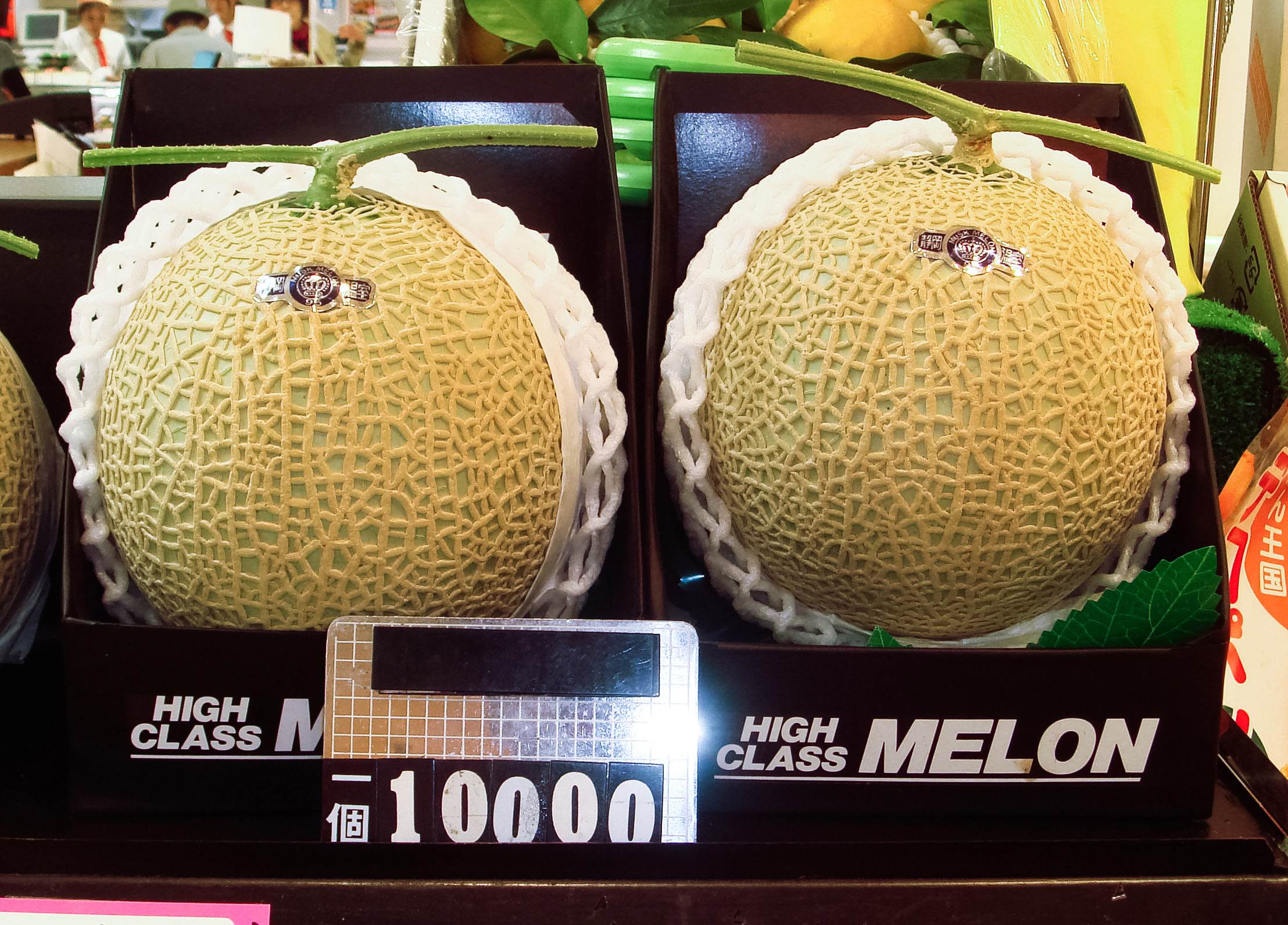
¥10000 (approx. US$100) melon, carefully cultivated and selected for its lack of imperfections, intended as a gift in the Japanese custom of gift-giving

Many people will ask a guest to open a gift, but if they do not, the recipient will resist the urge to ask if they can open the gift. Since the act of accepting a gift can create a sense of unfulfilled obligation on the part of the receiver, gifts are sometimes refused, depending on the situation. However, refusing a gift from someone of a higher rank can be considered rude, and is usually frowned upon.

=== Seasonal gifts ===
There are two gift seasons in Japan, called 歳暮 seibo and 中元 chūgen. One is for winter and the other is for summer. Gifts are given to those with whom one has a relationship, especially the people who have helped the gift giver. At those periods a subordinate will give gifts to a superior at the office, a pupil gives something to the master at tea ceremony classes, and even offices will prepare a courtesy gift for their business partners. For chūgen, July 20 is the latest date to deliver gifts for those living in Tokyo area.

=== Impolite gifts ===
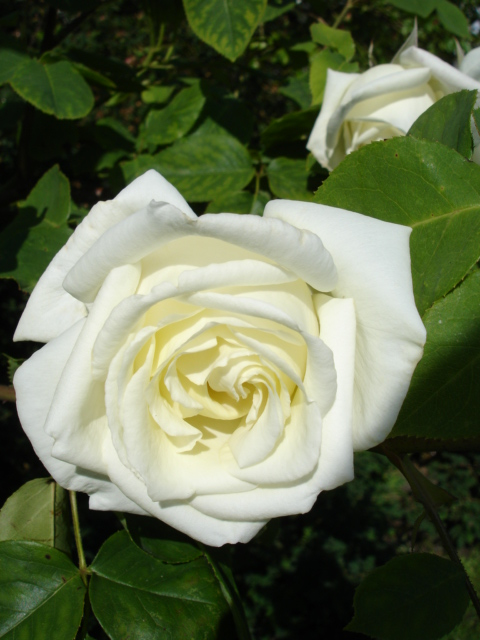
White flowers are not appropriate gifts as they are associated with funerals and bereavement in Japan.

Some items prominently displaying the numbers 4 and 9 are not given, since the reading of 4 (shi) suggests death, while 9 (ku) can also be read as a homonym for suffering or torture. Thus, a comb, or kushi is a carefully avoided item to give as a gift, as its name is reminiscent of the reading for 49 (shiku), which is a homonym for 'suffering until death'.

For wedding gifts, mirrors and ceramic wares as well as glassware, scissors and knives are not appropriate gifts because of the symbolism of breaking up or cutting the relationship, respectively. Clocks and other timepieces are also avoided, as they may be seen as symbolic of the relationship fading with the passage of time.

As a gift for a new home or a newly opened shop, anything that brings to mind fire or arson is avoided, including an ashtray, stove, heater or cigarette lighter, unless the intended recipient specifically requests it. If the recipient is older than the giver, or for those celebrating kanreki, shoes and socks are considered "to stamp on" the person.

=== Other gifts ===
Another custom in Japan is for women to give men chocolate on Valentine's Day. The chocolate can be given to the object of the woman's affection, or to any man the woman is connected to. The latter is called giri-choko (義理チョコ, obligation chocolate). Men who receive chocolate on Valentine's Day give something back to those they received from, one month later on White Day.

== Greetings ==
Greetings are considered to be of extreme importance in Japanese culture. Students in elementary and secondary schools are often admonished to deliver greetings with energy and vigor. A lazy greeting is regarded with the type of disdain that would accompany a limp handshake in parts of the West.

The most common greetings are ohayō gozaimasu (おはようございます) or "good morning", used until about 11:00 a.m. but may be used at any time of day. If it is the first occasion that day the two people have met, konnichiwa (こんにちは) is used, which is roughly equivalent to "good day" or "good afternoon" and is used until late afternoon; and konbanwa (今晩は) or "good evening". Different forms of these greetings may be used depending on the relative social statuses of the speaker and the listener.

== Letters and postcards ==
=== Titles ===
The titles for people are -chan (most often for female close friends, young girls or infants of either gender), -kun (most often for male close friends, or young boys), -san (for adults in general) and -sama (for customers, and also used for feudal lords, gods or buddhas).

Letter addresses, even those sent to close friends, are normally written in quite formal language. Unless some other title is available (sensei, for example, which can mean "doctor" or "professor" among other things) the standard title used with the addressee's name is the very formal -sama (様). Letters addressed to a company take the title onchū (御中) after the company name. It is also considered important to mention in the address if the company is incorporated (kabushiki gaisha) or limited (yūgen gaisha). When a letter is addressed to a company employee at their place of work, the address contains the full name of the place of work, as well as the title of the employee's position, and the full name of the employee.

=== Letter writing materials ===
Personal letters are traditionally written by hand using blue or black ink, or with a writing brush and black ink. The preferred paper is washi (Japanese paper). Although letters may be written vertically or horizontally (tategaki and yokogaki), vertical orientation is traditional and more formal. Red ink in letter writing is avoided, since writing a person's name in red ink suggests a wish for that person to die.

=== Greeting postcards ===
In Japan, holiday-goers do not send postcards. Instead, the tradition in Japan is for a holiday goer to bring back a souvenir, often edible (see "Gifts and gift-giving"). However, New Year's greeting postcards, or nengajō (年賀状), are a tradition similar to Christmas cards in the West. If sent within a time limit, the Japanese post office will deliver the cards on the morning of New Year's Day. These are decorated with motifs based on the year of the Chinese zodiac which is starting. They request the addressee's continued favor in the new year. If one receives a card from someone to whom one has not sent a card, etiquette dictates that one must send a card in return, to arrive no later than the seventh of January.

However, if a relative of a person has died during that year, they will send a postcard written in black before the New Year apologizing for not sending a New Year's card. The rationale for this is that since their relative has died they cannot wish or experience a happy new year. In this case, the etiquette is not to send them a New Year's Greeting either.

Summer cards are sent as well. Shochu-mimai (暑中見舞い) cards are sent from July to August 7 and zansho-mimai (残暑見舞い) cards are sent from August 8 until the end of August. These often contain a polite inquiry about the recipient's health. They are usually sold from the post office and as such contain a lottery number.

== Respectful language ==
There is an entire grammatical rule-set for speaking respectfully to superiors, customers, etc., and this plays a large part in good etiquette and in society as a whole. Japanese children are taught to act harmoniously and cooperatively with others from the time they go to pre-school.

This need for harmonious relationships between people is reflected in much Japanese behavior. Many place great emphasis on politeness, personal responsibility and working together for the universal, rather than the individual, good. They present disagreeable facts in a gentle and indirect fashion. They see working in harmony as the crucial ingredient for working productively.

== Service and public employees ==
Japan is frequently cited by non-Japanese as a place where service is excellent. Such claims are difficult, if not impossible, to quantify. Nevertheless, service at public establishments such as restaurants, drinking places, shops and services is generally friendly, attentive and very polite, as reflected in a common reminder given by managers and employers to their employees: "okyaku-sama wa kami-sama desu" (お客様は神様です), or "the customer is a god." (This is comparable to the western saying, "the customer is always right" and the Sanskrit saying "atithi devo bhavati"). Generally, service employees will seldom engage in casual conversation with a customer with the aim of forming a rapport as sometimes happens in western cultures. The service employees are expected to maintain a more formal, professional relationship with all customers. Private conversations among service staff are considered inappropriate when a customer is near.

In general, as in most countries, etiquette dictates that the customer is treated with reverence. In Japan this means that employees speak in a humble and deferential manner and use respectful forms of language that elevate the customer. Thus, customers are typically addressed with the title –sama (roughly equivalent to "sir" or "madam" in English). A customer is not expected to reciprocate this level of politeness to a server.

Dress for employees is normally neat and formal, depending on the type and style of establishment. Public employees such as police officers, taxi drivers, and the pushers whose job is to ensure that as many people as possible board the rush-hour trains—and other types of employees who must touch people—often wear white gloves.

== Funerals ==
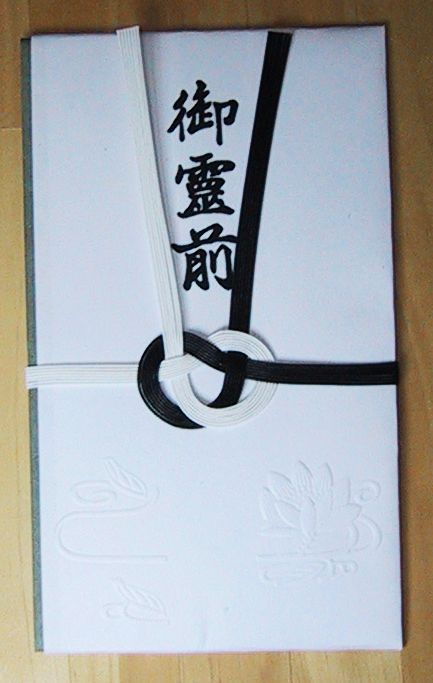
The design of a traditional kōden-bukuro, usually for amounts below 5,000 yen

People attending a Japanese funeral bring money called kōden (香典) either in special funeral offering envelopes kōden-bukuro (香典袋) or small plain white envelopes. Of the kōden-bukuro, the folded end at the bottom is be placed under the top fold, as the opposite or the bottom fold over the top one suggests that bad luck will become a series of misfortunes. Formally, there is a small bag called Fukusa (袱紗; also written as 帛紗 and 服紗) in which a person puts the envelope and brings to the funeral.

The appropriate format of kōden-bukuro varies depending on the ceremony style/religion as well as the amount of money put in. The title a person writes on the center of the face side is defined by religion as well as when to bring either for the Japanese wake or for the funeral proper. People also bring money to shijūkunichi (49日) the forty-ninth day service after death, especially when they did not attend the funeral. In addition, banknotes placed in kōden-bukuro should never be uncirculated, but rather be worn and bear signs of use; presenting new money is considered rude, as it could be taken to mean that the person giving the money had predicted the death and thus had time to order new banknotes to use.

== Special birthdays ==
- Seven, five, three: Shichi-go-san (七五三) is an event held on November 15 for children of these ages.
- Twenty: The twentieth birthday, 二十歳 or 二十, is when a person becomes an adult and can drink alcohol and smoke tobacco. Pronounced hatachi.
- Sixty: The sixtieth birthday is the occasion of kanreki, 還暦, when five cycles of the Chinese zodiac have completed.
- Seventy: The seventieth birthday is the occasion of koki, 古希, "age rarely attained", as taken from a verse 「人生七十古來稀なり」 meaning "very few live a long life up to 70 years of age" in a Chinese poem "曲江二首其二" by Du Fu.
- Seventy-seven: The seventy-seventh birthday is the occasion of kiju 喜寿, "happy age", because the Chinese character 喜 written in cursive style looks like the characters for seventy-seven (七十七).
- Eighty: The eightieth birthday is the occasion of sanju 傘寿, "umbrella age", because the Chinese character for umbrella, 傘 in cursive style as 仐, looks like the characters for eighty (八十).
- Eighty-eight: The eighty-eighth birthday is the occasion of beiju 米寿, "rice age", because the Chinese character for rice, 米, looks like the characters for eighty-eight (八十八).
- Ninety: The ninetieth birthday is the occasion of sotsuju 卒寿, "outgrowing age", because the Chinese character for outgrowth, 卒 in cursive style as 卆, looks like the characters for ninety (九十).
- Ninety-nine: The ninety-ninth birthday is the occasion of hakuju 白寿, "white age", because the Chinese character for white, 白, looks like the Chinese character for one hundred, 百, with the top stroke (which means "one") removed.
- Hundred: The hundredth birthday is the occasion of momoju 百寿, "centenary age". Also spelled kiju 紀寿.
- Hundred and eight: The hundred-and-eighth birthday is the occasion of chaju 茶寿, "tea age", because the Chinese character for tea, 茶, looks like the characters for ten, ten, and eighty-eight to add up to 108 (十、十、八十八).

== Business cards ==
Business cards are exchanged with care, at the very start of the meeting. Standing opposite each person, people exchanging cards offer them with both hands so that the other person can read it. Cards are not tossed across the table or held out casually with one hand. Cards are accepted with both hands and studied for a moment, then set carefully on the table in front of the receiver's seat or placed in a business card holder with a smile. If needed, one may ask how to pronounce someone's name at this juncture. When meeting a group of people, cards can be put in front of the receiver on the table for reference during the conversation or immediately placed in the receiver's card holder. Cards are never put in one's pocket or wallet, nor written on in the presence of the other person. This attention to business card etiquette is intended to show respect.

== See also ==
- Aizuchi
- Culture of Japan
- Intercultural competence
- Japanese cuisine
- Japanese language
- Ethnic issues in Japan
