= Japanese customs =

Japanese customs may refer to:

- The Japanese customs service
- Etiquette in Japan
