= Removal of footwear indoors =

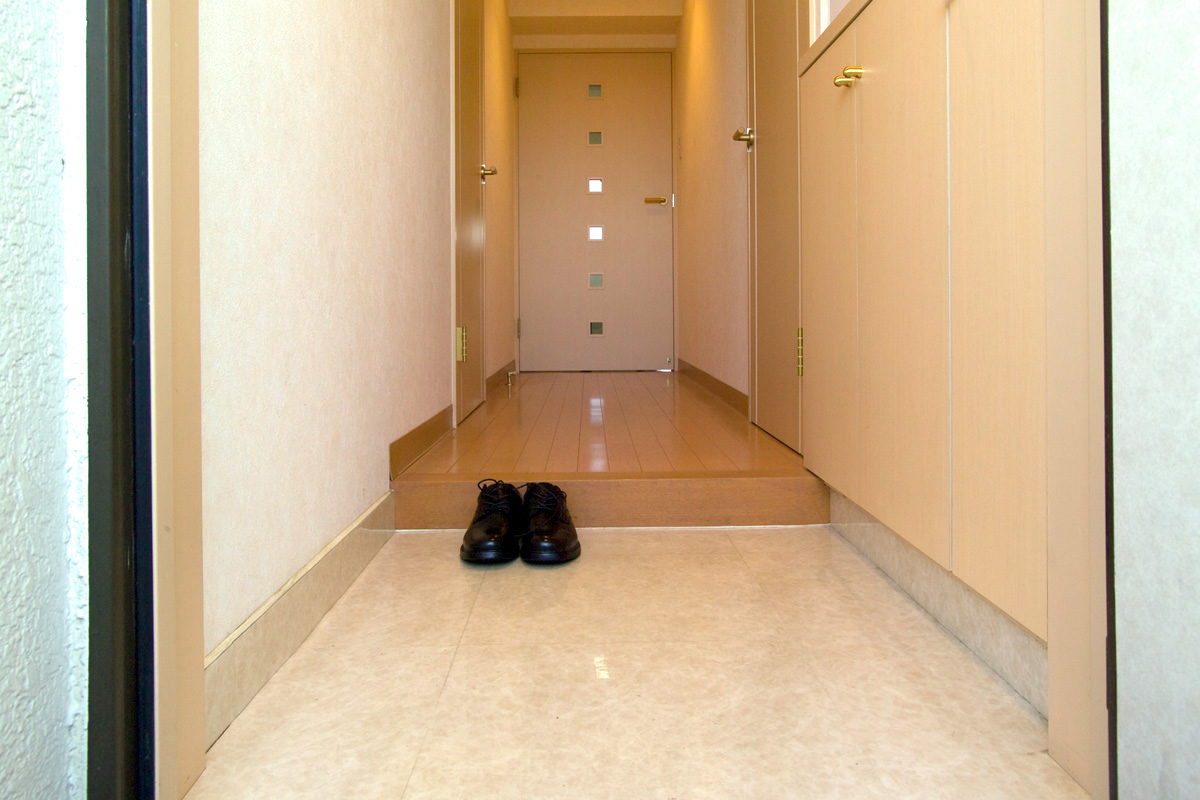
Genkan of a residence in Japan, viewed from outside looking in.

Traditions of removing shoes in the home vary greatly between the world's cultures. These customs impact whether people remove their shoes when coming home, whether people are expected to remove their shoes when visiting others' homes, and what people wear on their feet in homes if not shoes. Additionally, in some places, similar customs exist in places of worship or education.

== Background ==
In religions originating in the Indian subcontinent and in the Middle East, it is customary to remove one's shoes when entering a house of worship. Shoes were regarded as bringing in dust and removing one's shoes "would be a way of recognizing one's personal uncleanness in the presence of holiness" in the Christian traditions. Hinduism and Islam also regard feet as being unclean; it is considered sacrilegious to touch books with one's feet and an insult to point one's feet at someone. As such, in many mandirs and mosques, as well as in churches and synagogues of the Indian subcontinent and Middle East, it is customary for worshippers to remove their shoes before entering a house of worship, where they believe they are entering into the presence of the divine.

== Around the world ==
=== Asia ===
Many Asian countries typically follow the tradition of removing shoes before entering a house.

==== Southern Asia ====
In India, Pakistan, Bangladesh, Sri Lanka, Nepal and Maldives where having carpeted rugs are common, it is considered necessary to take one's shoes off in order to walk on carpeted rugs inside the home.

==== India ====
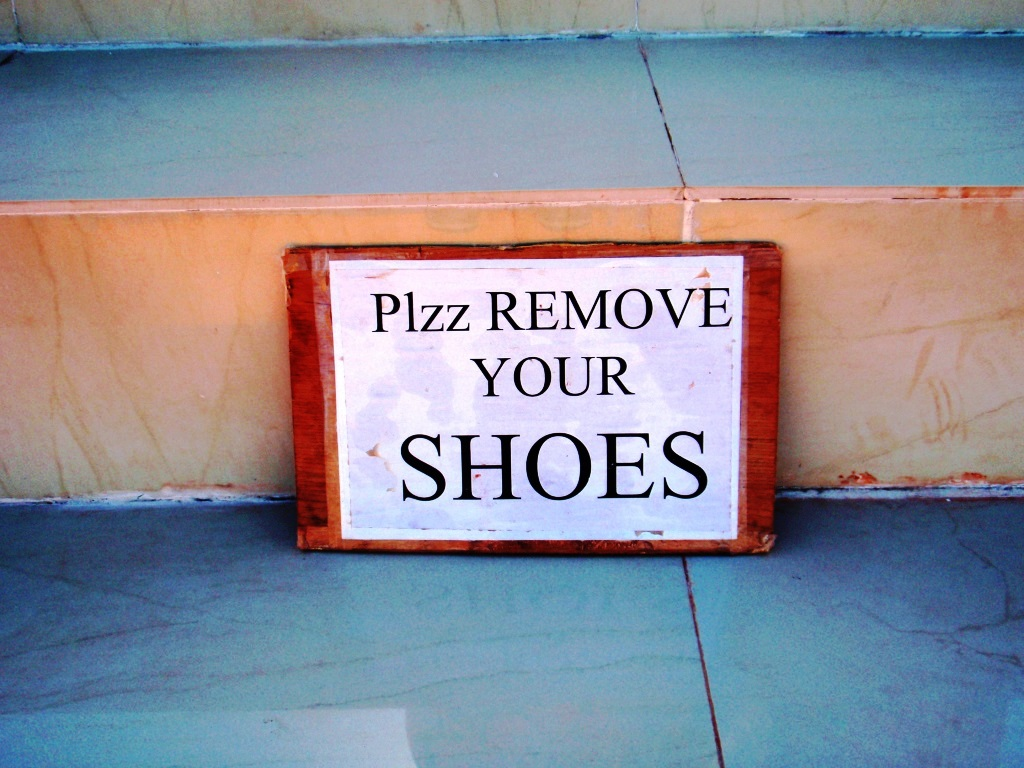
"Plzz REMOVE YOUR SHOES" sign at entrance to stupa. Nubra, India

It is considered a matter of hygiene to remove shoes before entering one's home. When people walk outside wearing shoes, they tend to bring dirt, grime, bacteria and infectious diseases into the house. In India, it is also customary for shoes to be taken off before entering others' homes. It is often considered by hosts, as rude when guests keep their shoes on whilst inside the house. It is considered sacrilegious to touch books with one's feet and an insult to point one's feet at someone.

==== Western Asia ====
In Afghanistan and Iran, removing one's shoes before entering a home is a widespread tradition, with the cleanliness of a home very important for families. It is also common to remove shoes in kindergarten schools and, although rarely, in some small private businesses.

In the Arab world, no shoes are allowed indoors, as the shoes' soles are seen as dirty and unsanitary. Arab Muslims are required to remove their shoes when entering a mosque, as are all adherents of Islam.

While it is not mandatory in Judaism, many Israeli Jews remove their shoes at home. During the Priestly Blessing in the synagogue, the kohanim (priests) will remove their shoes. Israel is also home to many Muslims, who harbour much stricter shoe-wearing rules than their Jewish counterparts.

==== Eastern Asia ====
In Japan, the genkan, an entryway area to a house, apartment, or building, is where outdoor shoes are removed. One may change into uwabaki, indoor slippers at the genkan, especially in school. In addition, there are separate toilet slippers (トイレスリッパ, toire surippa) into which one changes before entering the washroom from the rest of the house. The outdoors are considered to be an extremely unclean space by the Japanese people, alongside the aforementioned toilet area. Only the indoors is considered a clean space, and it is typically kept very tidy by the homeowner. One must change into appropriate footwear before entering the corresponding spaces. On tatami, it is often considered to be inappropriate to wear even uwabaki.

It is habitual to remove outdoor footwear and put on a pair of slippers after entering the Chinese household, although some people in certain parts of China and Taiwan do not take off their shoes at home. In social reunions or parties at houses, guests are not always demanded to take their shoes off, especially in big celebrations such as the Chinese New Year, when the number of guests in a house is frequently superior to the number of slippers available for guests.

In Korea, it is customary to take one's shoes off at the entryway, known as hyun-gwan (현관), before entering a house. Some households may use indoor slippers, but it is far more common to walk around barefoot or in socks. In the bathroom, Koreans typically wear rubber slippers to prevent slipping. Entering a house with shoes on is considered disrespectful, as it is synonymous with bringing in outside dirt and grime to one's residence. Modern Korean apartments often have built-in shoe cabinets at the hyun-gwan, which doubles as a storage area for other objects.

==== Southeast Asia ====
In Vietnam, it is customary to remove shoes before entering any house or flat. It is also common to remove shoes in kindergarten schools and in some small private businesses.

In Malaysia, it is common practice (amongst all of the various ethnic communities) to remove their shoes before entering any house or apartment. More modern households will use and provide indoor slippers. Some temples like Batu Caves and religious places such as mosques and suraus require the removal of shoes before entering. Modern schools require students to remove their shoes before entering air-conditioned spaces including designated classrooms, laboratories, libraries and carpeted administrative spaces. Students still wear shoes at more open spaces such as sports courts, halls, passively ventilated classrooms, passively ventilated laboratories or in the corridors; these areas are more exposed to the elements as Malaysian schools are mostly passively ventilated, allowing natural airflow due to the warm weather. Some smaller private offices and mixed shopfront-offices exercise the removal of shoes, especially on (but not limited to) carpeted floors.

In Thailand, all homes require the removal of shoes and placement of them in front of the main door. One also needs to remove their shoes to enter some buildings in Thai temples, especially in Ubosot. Kindergarten schools and some buildings in old elementary or high schools also require students to take off their shoes as well. However, in some houses or schools, slippers are allowed, but those are not allowed outside the buildings, as well in some restrooms there are provided sandals for changing before entering restrooms to keep it clean.

==== Myanmar (Burma) ====
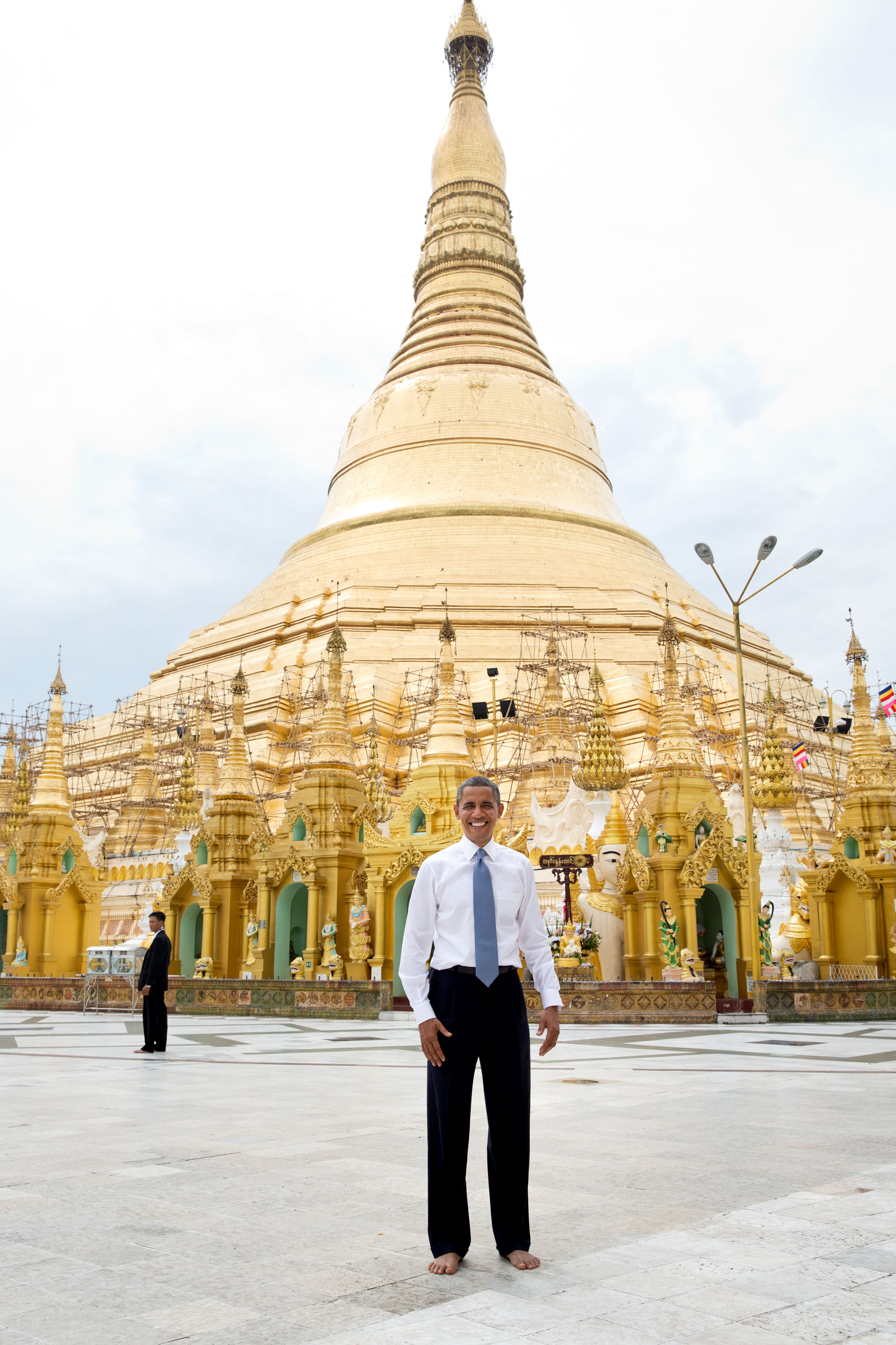
Former US President Barack Obama poses barefoot on the grounds of Shwedagon Pagoda, one of Myanmar's major Buddhist pilgrimage sites

In Myanmar, footwear is customarily removed before entering a home and Buddhist places of worship. Many workplaces in Myanmar also have shoe-free areas, or restrict footwear altogether, with shoes typically left at the corridor or at the entrance of an office.

These customs are strictly enforced in Buddhist places of worship, including Burmese pagodas and in Buddhist monasteries called kyaung. The Burmese remove their footwear at such sites as a sign of religious respect.

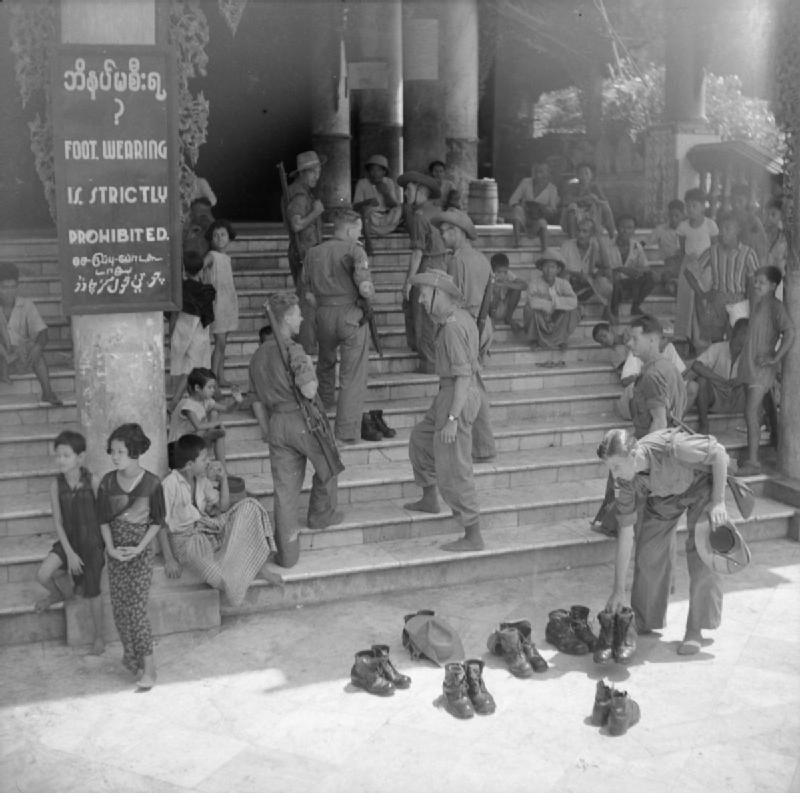
British soldiers remove their shoes at the entrance of Shwedagon Pagoda. To the left, a sign reads "Foot wearing is strictly prohibited" in Burmese, English, Tamil, and Urdu.

Strict enforcement of this custom, however, is partly a legacy of British rule in Burma, during which Europeans refused and were exempted from removing their footwear when entering Buddhist places of worship. In pre-colonial Burma, non-royals removed their footwear before entering palace grounds, as a token of respect for the reigning monarch. In the final years of the Konbaung dynasty, diplomatic relations between the British and Burmese soured when the British Resident, a colonial representative, refused to remove his shoes upon entering the Mandalay Palace platform, a decision that prevented him from meeting King Thibaw Min. Consequently, the British withdrew the Resident and his delegation in October 1879, with his exit portending the Third Anglo-Burmese War, after which the remaining half of the Burmese kingdom (Upper Burma) was fully annexed into British India.

This "shoe question" became a rallying cry for Burmese nationalists, comparable to the cow protection movement in neighboring British India. In 1916, the nationalist Young Men's Buddhist Association (YMBA) began campaigning against foreigners wearing shoes in pagoda grounds, with Buddhist monks at the forefront of the campaign. The Ledi Sayadaw, a prominent Buddhist monk, penned On the Impropriety of Wearing Shoes on Pagoda Platforms, which drew in widespread support for the YMBA's activism. In 1919, after a two-year battle, Thein Maung, a YMBA member, successfully persuaded the colonial government to issue an order prohibiting footwear on the grounds of religious sites.

Foreigners have been successfully prosecuted and punished for refusing to remove their footwear at Burmese religious sites. In August 2017, a Russian tourist was arrested and sentenced to one month and then a further six months of jail time and hard labor for repeatedly refusing to remove her shoes upon entering pagoda grounds throughout Bagan, as she had violated local customs, per Section 13(1) of the Immigration Act. Burmese authorities subsequently announced a crackdown tourists wearing shoes inside Bagan's pagodas.

=== Australasia ===
==== Australia and New Zealand ====
Removing shoes before entering a house is commonplace in New Zealand, in all areas, and may stem from the Māori tradition of removing shoes before entering the wharenui.

In Australia, footwear removal in the home varies across households and is often linked to family origins. Australians from non-European backgrounds are more likely to keep a shoes-off house.

=== Europe ===
==== Western Europe ====
In France, it is rare for guests to be requested to take their shoes off when entering one's home, particularly if they are not close guests. However, it is very common to leave shoes at the entrance of one's own home or a close acquaintance's home.

In Germany and Austria shoes are mostly also traditionally removed, but to a less extent, being also not uncommon to let them in. This is the case especially for short visits, even if entering interior rooms.

In the Netherlands, it is a little uncommon to take off shoes at home. Visitors are not usually expected to take off their shoes when entering a home. However, in some cases a host may ask people entering the home to take off their shoes. It is uncommon to walk around barefoot.

In the United Kingdom, footwear habits reveal a significant generational divide. A 2023 survey reported that 78% of people aged 18 to 34 have a "shoes-off" rule in their home, compared with only 51% of those over 55. Cultural commentators also observe a rural-urban distinction, noting that shoe removal is often less practical in rural homes due to cold stone floors and the frequent need to move between the house and the garden.

In Ireland, it is very uncommon to take one's shoes off when entering a house, especially for visitors.

==== Southern Europe ====
In Italy, shoes are removed at the front door upon arrival at home only in a minority of households, usually under the influence of other cultures, especially northern European or Koreans. It is also very uncommon for Italians to go barefoot in the home, as this would leave a greasy residue on the tiled or hardwood floors that are common there. Even in the majority of homes that allow shoes indoor, the use of slippers (commonly referred to as pantofole or ciabatte) is extremely common; When entering someone else's home, or when welcoming guests at one's own home, wearing shoes is usual and seen as a sign of respect. Furthermore, areas outside the home are considered dirty and thus the use of shoes which fully cover the foot is usually preferred.

There is no specific standard on footwear in the Spanish or Portuguese home. It is commonplace in both countries to remove footwear before entering someone's home. Nevertheless, some people in Spain, Portugal and Andorra choose to wear slippers in their own home. This may be due to tile flooring being very common and to prevent cold feet. It is not uncommon for guests to walk around barefoot or with socks in ones home. It is optional to remove shoes and seen as polite to allow guests to have a choice.

In Greece, it is uncommon to go barefoot in the home. When at home, it is a personal choice to either wear shoes or slippers, however, the use of slippers (commonly referred to as "pantofles") in one's own home is commonplace. It is not customary to remove one's shoes when visiting another household unless one is asked to do so, and shoes are not removed on any social occasion. Shoes are kept on in churches, as well as all other public indoor spaces.

In Turkey, most people remove their shoes before entering any house. Not to remove shoes is a major faux pas for guests, instead slippers are offered.

==== Eastern Europe ====
In all the Slavic countries (Russia, Ukraine, Poland, etc.), most of which are in Eastern Europe, people will take off their shoes at home and will expect visitors to do so, unless it is a formal meeting or a social event. When in doubt, people will usually ask if they can keep their shoes on. When at home, some people will walk barefoot while others will wear slippers (this often depends on the type of floor covering, e.g. carpets vs wooden floor). It is common for schoolchildren to have a special pair of shoes for wearing at school, especially in winter. Furthermore, many households provide spare indoor slippers for visitors. Some people will have a special pair of shoes for wearing at work, especially in winter. In restaurants, shops, theatres, and museums shoes are not taken off. Shoes are not taken off in churches.

In the southeast of Europe (former Yugoslavia, Albania, Bulgaria, etc.), people traditionally remove their shoes and either walk barefoot or wear indoor slippers at home, especially in winter. Visitors that venture beyond the entry hallway are expected to remove their shoes. Because of this, it is considered courteous for hosts to provide slippers for their guests. Some workplaces may require their employees reserve a pair of shoes for indoor use. Shoes are kept on in churches, as well as most other public indoor spaces, but they are always removed in mosques.

==== Central Europe ====
In Czech Republic and Slovakia, the customs there regarding the commonality of shoe-wearing in the home and beyond remains mostly identical to that of other Slavs. This also holds true for the nations of Hungary, Romania, and Moldova. In Slovenia like in former Yugoslavia, people traditionally remove their shoes and wear indoor slippers at home. For visitors slippers are provided if entering the house.

==== Northern Europe ====
In Northern Europe, especially in Scandinavia, Finland and Iceland, it is considered unhygienic and rude by most to keep one's shoes on when entering a house, in particular boots or outdoor walking shoes. There may be exceptions, especially when it is a short visit where it is not necessary to enter the interior rooms of the house or flat. For the most part though, shoes are taken off — in part due to the harsh winter weather.

=== North America ===
==== Canada ====
Likewise in Canada, it is generally seen as unhygienic and rude when guests do not take off their shoes when entering the home. It is expected that a guest would remove their shoes when entering a home, unless the host states otherwise, which is generally rare.

In addition to residential homes, the removal of shoes also occurs in other settings, particularly during the winter; as footwear worn outside may be wet from snow and soiled by the associated salt/sand that is used to clear roads of snow cover. As a result, many schools in Canada require students to bring with them or leave behind a pair of "indoor shoes" at the school for indoor wear during the winter months. The same with gyms, offices, and other private establishments during the winter months. During the summer, it is common to wear outdoor shoes to school, the office, the gym, etc. Some specialized medical facilities require patients to remove shoes in order to maintain cleanliness, or to at least wear disposable paper bootees over those shoes. The latter with anti-static protections are common in cleanrooms in medical and technological facilities worldwide.

==== United States ====
Taking shoes off indoors is not a tradition within the continental United States, but is considered expected in Hawaii, Alaska, Guam, and the Northern Mariana Islands. According to a YouGov poll in 2018, whilst many Americans take off their shoes indoors at home, they may or may not request their guests to take off their shoes. It is also prevalent in the Northeast due to poor weather in the winter, as well as in the Pacific Northwest, with standards differing from household to household. Slippers are generally not offered. In New England, many elementary schools require students to bring an indoor pair of shoes as well as winter boots. This is especially the case during rainy weather, when one's shoes could easily get very muddy, wet, or dirty.

== See also ==
- Hygiene in Christianity
- List of shoe-throwing incidents
- Shoe tossing
- Shoes on a table
