= Kamiza =

Seat of honor in Japanese culture

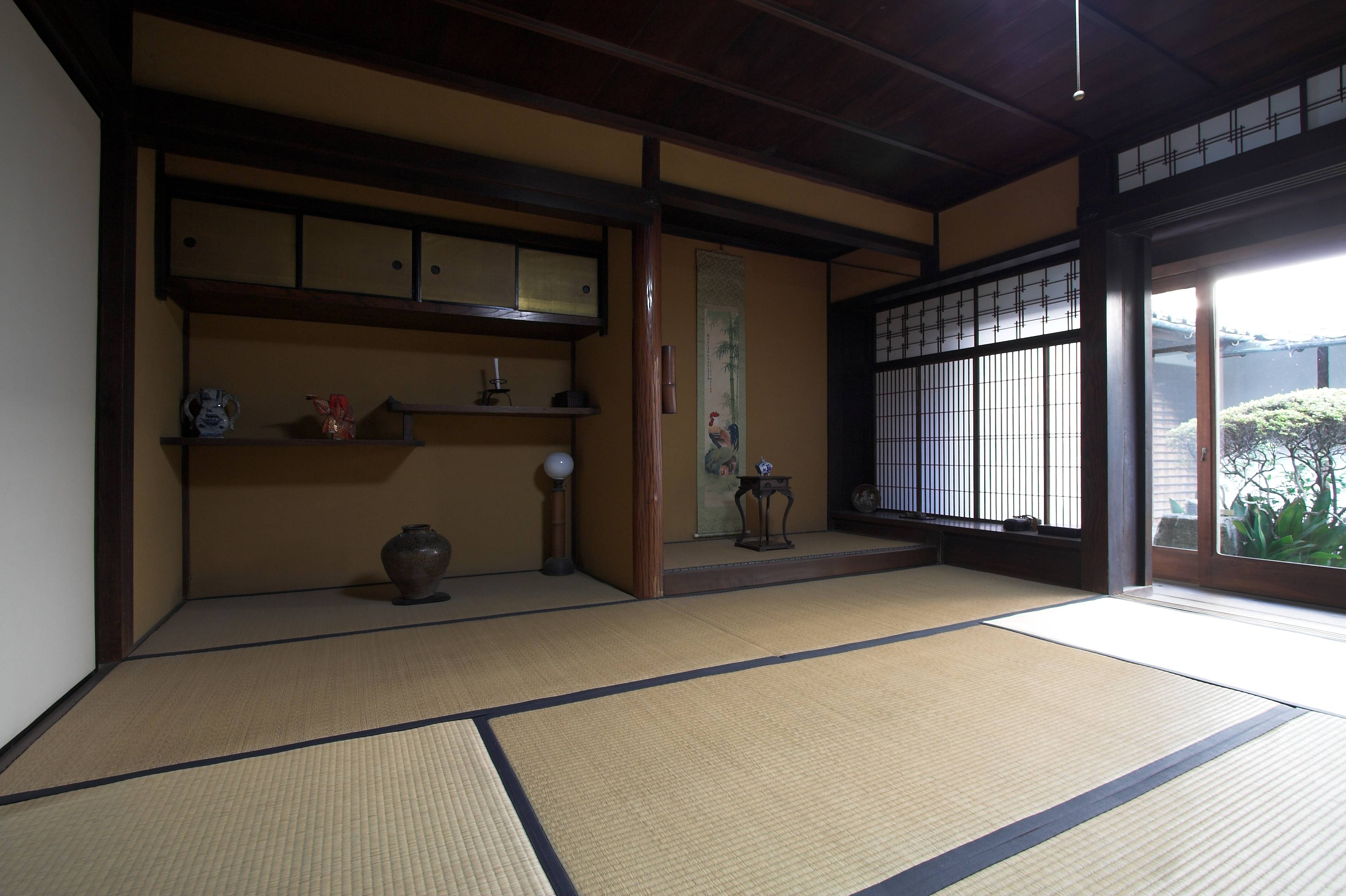
A traditional Japanese room with a tokonoma

The kamiza (Japanese: 上座) is the "top seat" within a room, meaning the seat of honor; the term also applies to the best seats in airplanes, trains, and cars. The antonym, meaning "bottom seat," is shimoza (下座). In a room, the kamiza is the seat or position that is most comfortable, usually furthest from the door. This is because it is the warmest, and was the safest from attack back in the feudal era. In a traditional washitsu room, it would often be a zabuton placed so the person sitting there has his back to the tokonoma; the kamiza is the spot closest to the tokonoma or simply furthest from the door in a room lacking a tokonoma. In a Western-style room, it would be a comfortable armchair or sofa, or the head of a table. The term is general, and does not only apply to Japanese culture.

== Choosing a seat ==
When entering a room in Japan on a formal occasion, participants are expected to assume the correct seating position, and to leave the kamiza free for the most important person present, either a guest of honor or the person of highest rank. However, if one humbly sits somewhere indicative of lower status and is then encouraged by the host to move to the kamiza, it is acceptable to do so.

The best seats in a car in descending order of rank are: directly behind the driver, behind the front passenger, in the middle of the back seat, front passenger seat, driver. In airplane or train passenger seating, the "top seat" is the window-side, followed by the aisle seat and then the middle seat.

In professional shogi games, players sometimes insist that the other player occupy the kamiza. For example, before a 2015 game between Yoshiharu Habu and Tetsurō Itodani, respectively holding the prestigious Meijin and Ryūō titles, Habu offered Itodani the kamiza but after an exchange, ultimately relented.

== See also ==
- Butsudan
- Etiquette in Japan
- Kamidana
- Tokonoma
- Order of precedence
