= Uwabaki =

Japanese indoor footwear

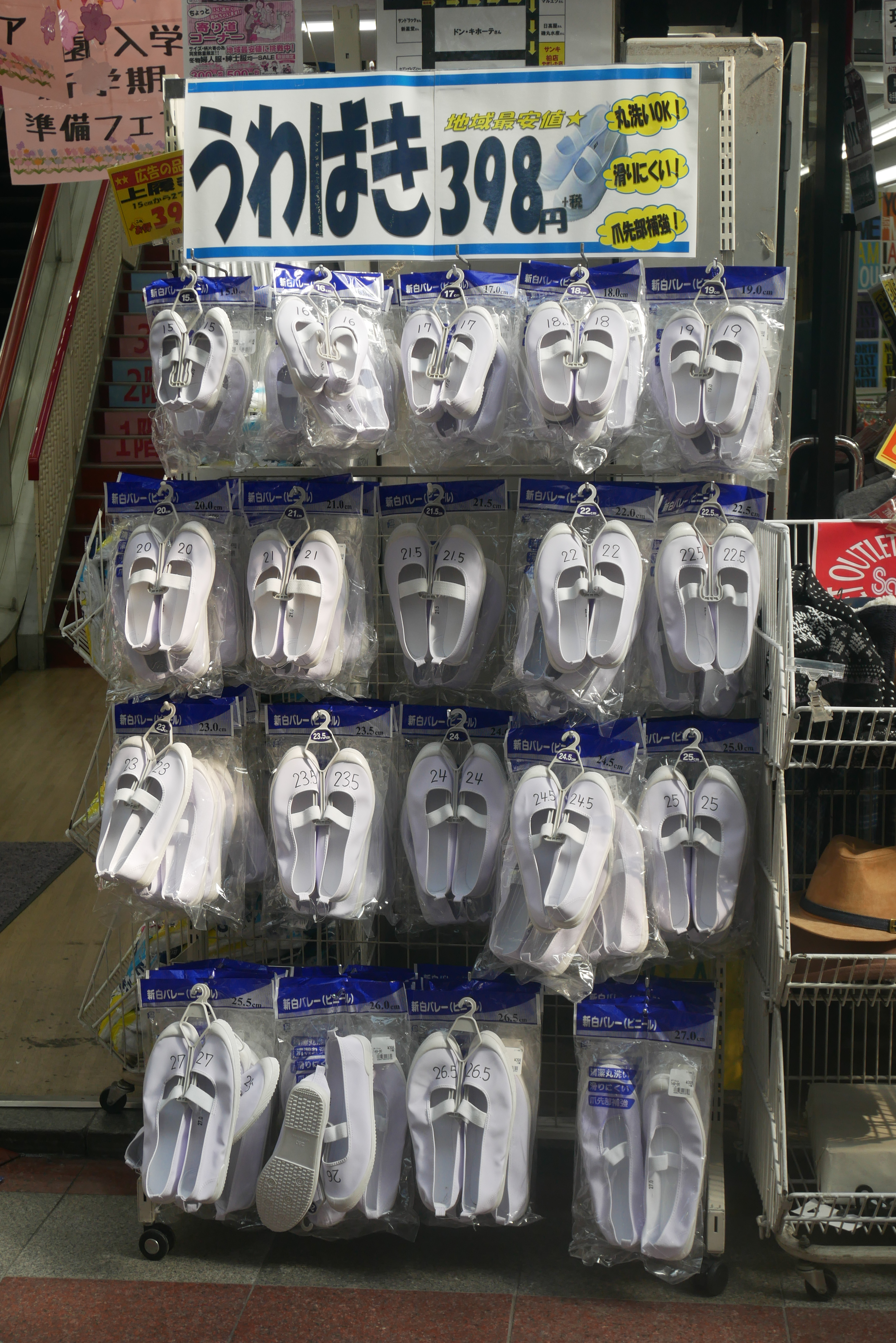
Various sizes of uwabaki for sale

Uwabaki (上履き) are a type of Japanese slippers worn indoors at school or certain companies and public buildings where street shoes are prohibited.

Japanese culture mandates that people should remove their shoes when entering homes and other buildings, especially where the floors may have rugs, polished wood floors, or tatami. Uwabaki are light, flexible shoes which are easy to slip on and off, designated for indoor use. As they are not generally worn outside, the soles are kept clean, and thus cleaning and maintenance of the building's floors are kept to a minimum.

At the entrance of every school, from preschool to college, there is a genkan with an assigned locker (getabako) for each student to put uwabaki. A student's grade level is often indicated by a colored stripe across the toes; the body color of the slipper is always white.

== See also ==
- List of shoe styles
- School uniforms in Japan
