= Genkan =

Entryway area in Japanese buildings

Genkan (玄関) are traditional Japanese entryway areas for a house, apartment, or building, a combination of a porch and a doormat. It is usually located inside the building directly in front of the door. The primary function of genkan is for the removal of shoes before entering the main part of the house or building.

A secondary function is a place for brief visits without being invited across the genkan step into the house proper. For example, where a pizza delivery driver in an English-speaking country would normally stand on the porch and conduct business through the open front door, in Japan a food delivery would traditionally have taken place across the genkan step.

After removing shoes, one must avoid stepping on the tiled or concrete genkan floor (三和土, tataki) in socks or with bare feet, to avoid bringing dirt into the house. Once inside, generally one will change into uwabaki (上履き): slippers or shoes intended for indoor wear.

Genkan are also occasionally found in other buildings in Japan, especially in old-fashioned businesses.

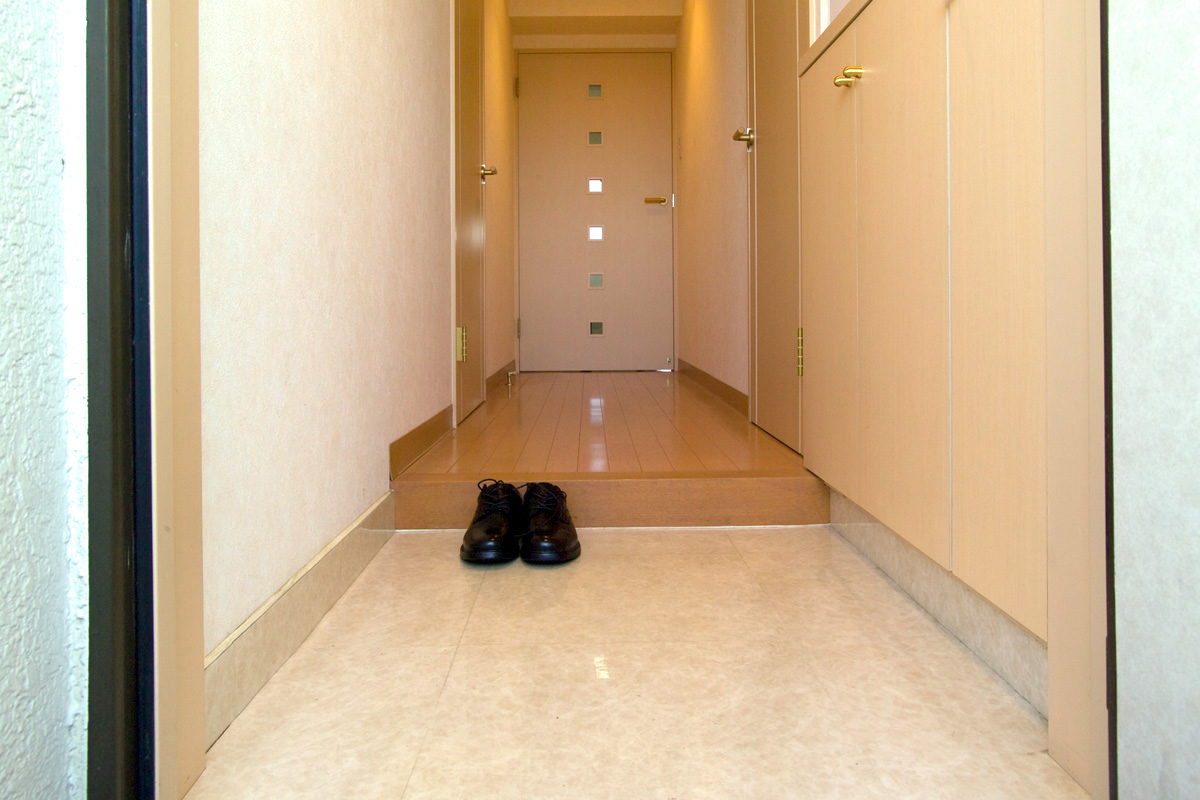
Genkan of a residence in Japan, viewed from outside looking in

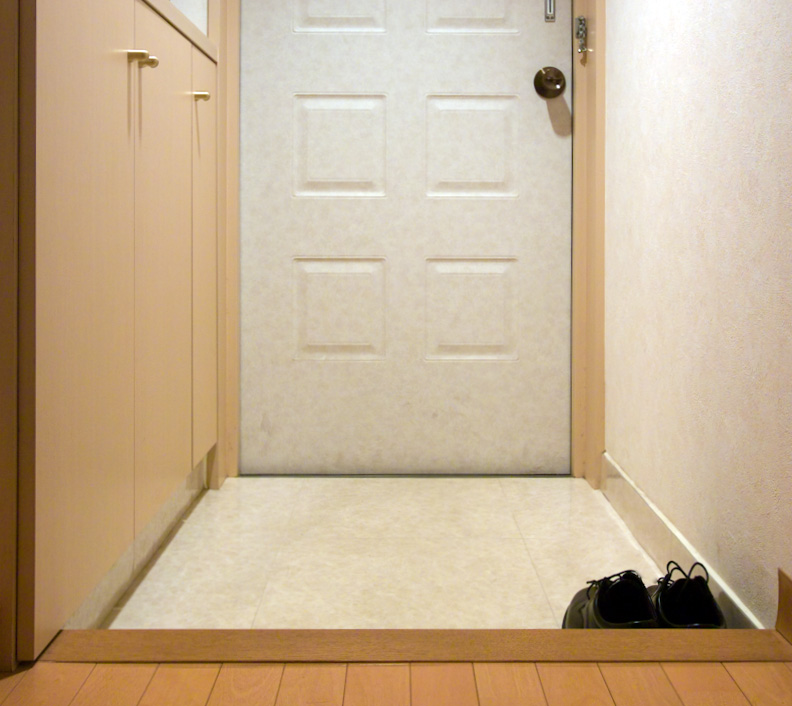
The same genkan, viewed from inside looking out. The doors on the left wall are getabako.

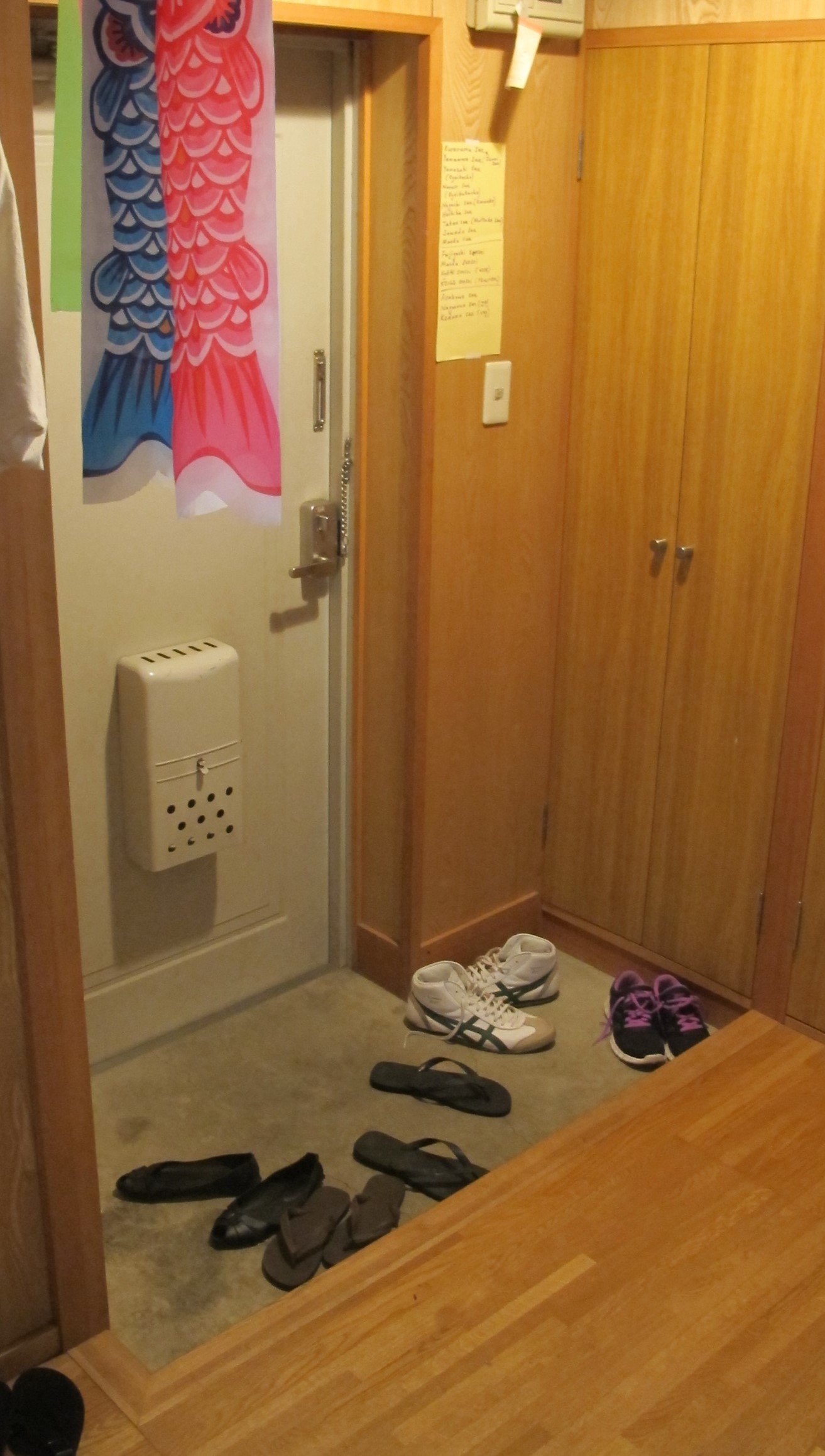
A genkan without getabako

== Design ==
Genkan are normally recessed into the floor, to contain any dirt that is tracked in from the outside (as in a mud room). The height of the step varies from very low (5–10 centimetres, 2–4 in) to shin-level or knee-level. Genkan in apartments are usually much smaller than those in houses, and may have no difference in elevation with the rest of the floor; it may simply have a different type of flooring material than the rest of the floor to distinguish it as the genkan.

Schools and public baths (銭湯, sentō) have large shoe cupboards (下駄箱, getabako) with compartments for each person's outdoor shoes. In private residences, getabako may be absent, and shoes are usually turned to face the door so they can be slipped on easily when leaving.

== History ==
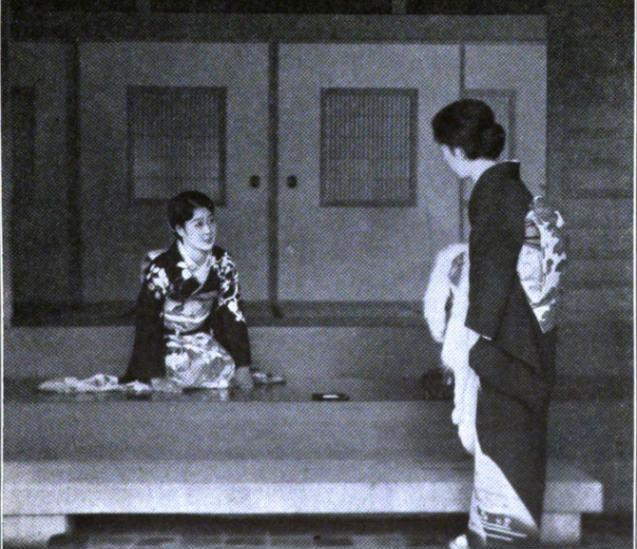
Traditional genkan in the early 20th century

The custom of removing one's shoes before entering the house is believed to go back over one thousand years to the pre-historical era of elevated-floor structures. It has continued to the present, even after the Westernization of the Japanese home, which began in the Meiji period (1868–1912).

== See also ==
- Engawa (traditional Japanese veranda)
