= Getabako =

Japanese shoe cupboard

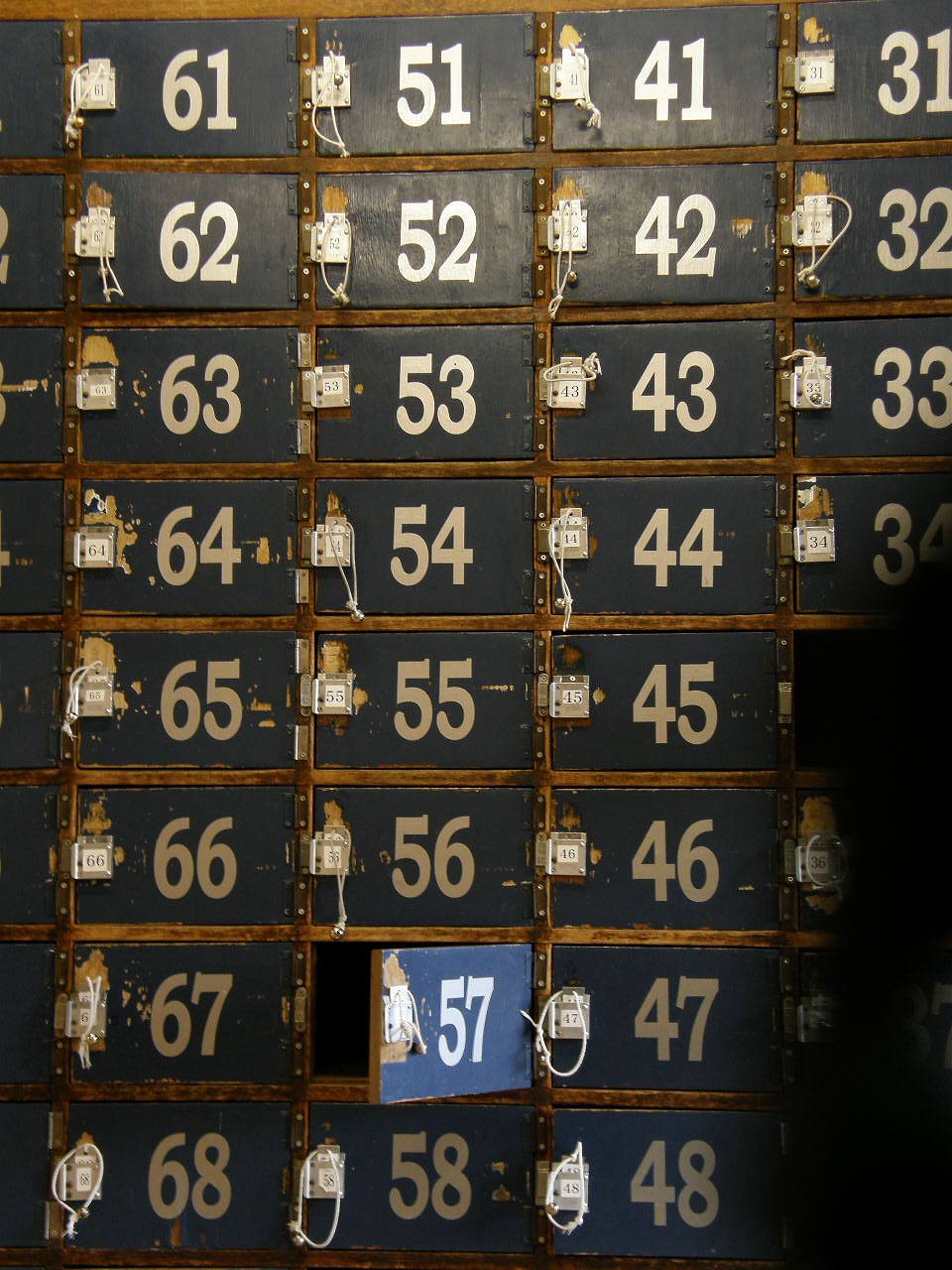
A getabako in the bath house of Kobe, Japan

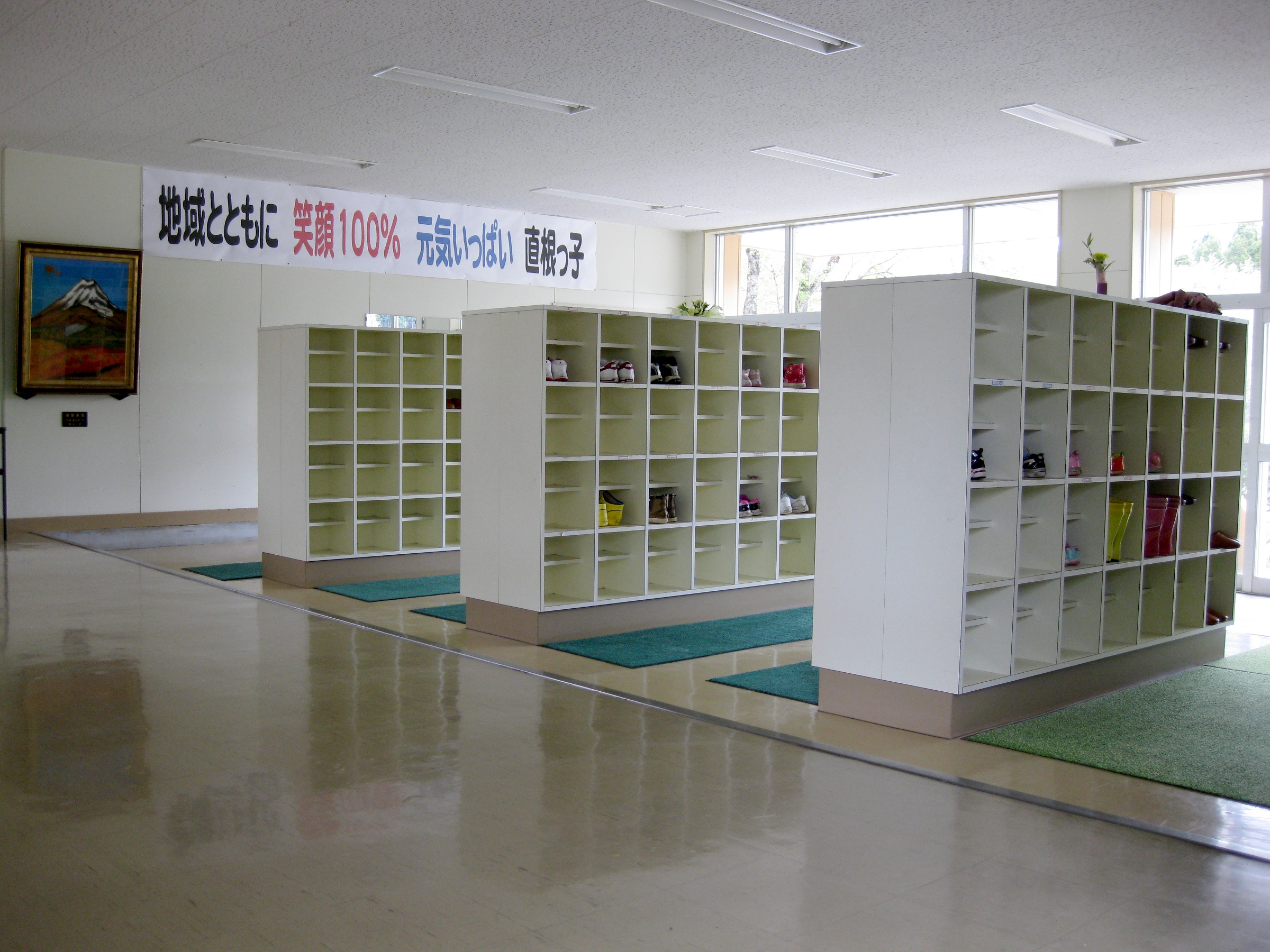
Getabako at an elementary school

A getabako (下駄箱) is a shoe cupboard in Japan, usually situated in the genkan, an entryway or porch of the house. This is often called a cubby in the United States. In Japan, it is considered uncouth to not remove one's shoes before entering the house. Near the getabako is a slipper rack, and most people in Japan wear slippers around the house, except for rooms which have tatami flooring, as they are bad for the floor. The getabako is usually made of wood and bamboo, and there are many sold all over the world.

The word "getabako" is from geta (下駄, Japanese wooden clog) and hako (箱, "box").

Usually there are big getabako in schools, and each student has their own section. Sometimes, students store personal things there as well, or use them to leave love letters.

== See also ==
- Locker
