= Michael Liebreich =

British businessman (born 1963)

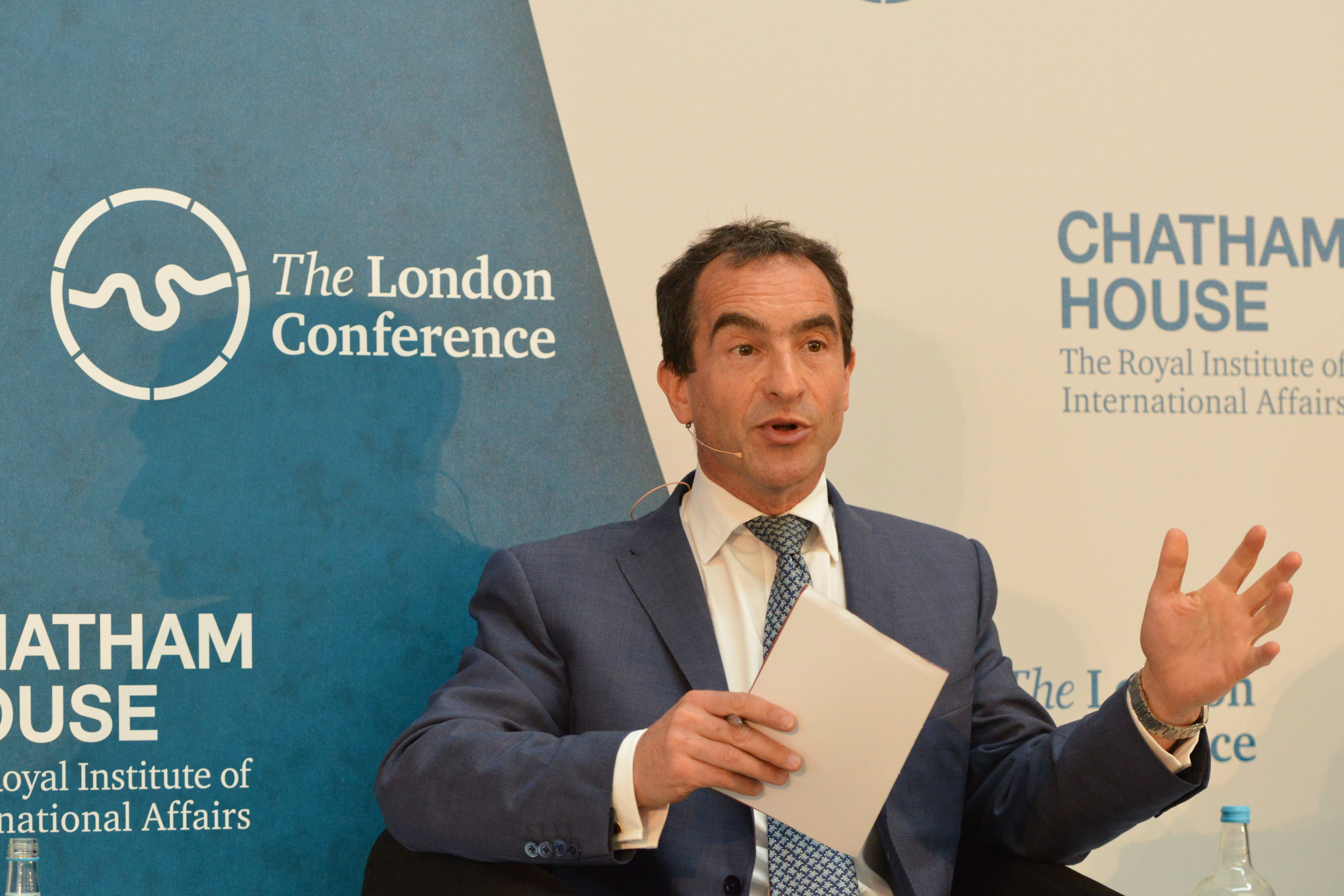
- Michael Liebreich at the London Conference at Chatham House 2015.
- Born: 11 August 1963

Michael Liebreich (born 11 August 1963) is a businessman in the field of clean energy. He is the chairman of Liebreich Associates, through which he provides advisory services and speaks on clean energy and transportation, smart infrastructure, technology, climate finance and sustainable development. He is also a senior contributor at Bloomberg New Energy Finance, a company he founded in 2004 that was acquired by Bloomberg in 2009.

In July 2020, he launched his weekly podcast Cleaning Up. Guests are leaders in clean energy, mobility, climate finance or sustainable development, and have included Tony Blair and Ban Ki-moon. In March 2021, Michael became a co-founding partner of EcoPragma Capital. EcoPragma is a Growth Equity investor, investing in companies on the cusp of strong commercial growth and contributing to the net-zero transition. In the past, starting in 2020, he was a member of the UK’s Board of Trade. In November 2022, Michael was awarded an Honorary Fellowship from the Energy Institute.

== Personal life ==
Michael Liebreich was born in 1963 in Northolt, West London. Raised in Acton, Liebreich attended Silverdale Prep School followed by Colet Court and St Paul's School of London. He graduated from Christ's College, Cambridge, with first class honours in 1984, specialising in mechanics, fluid dynamics, thermodynamics and nuclear engineering. He graduated from Harvard Business School in 1990.

From 1985 to 1993, he was a member of the British Ski Team (Moguls) and competed in World & European Cups, World & European Championships and the 1992 Albertville Olympics. He is also co-author of The Complete Skier (BBC Books, 1993). Liebreich is an avid cross-country skier and has been a regular participant in the Engadin Skimarathon which he has completed in under 3 hours.

Liebreich was the Chairman of St. Marks Hospital Foundation, the charity arm of St. Mark's Hospital, a centre of clinical excellence which specialises in research and teaching on colorectal medicine.

== Professional career ==
Before starting New Energy Finance, Liebreich worked as a consultant at McKinsey & Company from 1990 to 1995. He also worked as a venture capitalist with Groupe Arnault, and was commercial director of Associated Press Television (now APTN), and founding director of Sports News Television (SNTV).

Liebreich created New Energy Finance in 2004 as a specialist provider of information on clean energy and resources for the finance and energy industries, manufacturers and policymakers. He reportedly started the company with "the help of interns and a Polish programmer he found on Rent A Coder". By 2011, he had built the company to a staff of nearly 200.

In 2011, Liebreich was the executive producer of a video short illustrating the world's ultimate shift away from fossil fuels, titled "First They Ignore You...".

Liebreich is a member of numerous energy-focused industry groups, including the World Economic Forum's Global Agenda Council on the New Energy Architecture and the UN Secretary General's High Level Group on Sustainable Energy for All. Liebreich is a former member of the advisory board of the Clinton Global Initiative's Energy and Climate Change working group, the selection panel for the Zayed Future Energy Prize, Accenture's Global Energy Board and the UN Secretary General's High Level Advisory Group on Energy and Climate Change. He is also a visiting professor at London's Imperial College Energy Futures Lab, a board member for Transport for London, a member of the Advisory Panel of the INSEAD Energy Club, and an organiser of the annual ecovillage event at Les Diablerets, Switzerland.

In February 2015 he wrote a piece critical of the draft UN Sustainable Development Goals, due to be adopted later in the year, suggesting instead that they be replaced by 12 alternative goals which are not overtly anti-business.

=== Bloomberg New Energy Finance ===
Liebreich sold his company (formerly New Energy Finance) to Bloomberg L.P. in 2009 in hopes of strengthening the company's position in the energy industry.

Bloomberg L.P. Chairman Peter Grauer stated: “This acquisition is the next step in Bloomberg’s initiative to develop and promote the carbon and clean energy markets.” From 2009, Liebreich acted as the CEO of Bloomberg New Energy Finance, where he oversaw the delivery of investment-grade information about the world's energy industry. In January 2014, Liebreich stepped down as CEO of BNEF and is now Chairman of the Advisory Board.

== Politics ==
In 2014 rumours began to circulate that Liebreich was a potential Conservative candidate for Mayor of London. In June 2014, he was reported to have higher odds of winning than better known politicians including David Lammy and George Galloway according to data from bookmaker Paddy Power.

In March 2015 he wrote a piece entitled “The Good Right must be a Green Right” for Tim Montgomerie’s Good Right project, arguing any truly conservative agenda would include as a foundational principle care for our physical environment.

== Awards ==
Liebreich graduated with first class honours from Cambridge University in 1984, winning the Ricardo Prize for Thermodynamics and the Christ's College Wyatt Prize for Engineering. In 1988, he was awarded a Harkness Fellowship by the Commonwealth Fund of New York for his studies at Harvard Business School, where he graduated as a Baker Scholar.

In 2003 Liebreich was awarded a Testimonial on Vellum by the Royal Humane Society, which is a charity that grants awards for acts of bravery in the saving of human life. Their commendation says: “Liebreich co-ordinated the rescue of a young woman from a ravine in the Bolivian Andes. Despite an extraordinary team effort, she died from her injuries at the scene.”

In 2005 New Energy Finance was named the Euromoney Ernst & Young Information Provider of the Year. Liebreich is a three-time finalist for the Ernst & Young Entrepreneur of the Year Award. In 2014, Liebreich won a Clean Air City Award for his personal contribution to improving London's air quality.

== Philanthropy ==
In 2010, Liebreich set up the Liebreich Foundation, a family charity which applies funds to charitable causes at the discretion of the trustees.

In 2018, Liebreich launched a charitable campaign named Project Bo which raised money to support a Neonatal Intensive Care Unit in the city of Bo, Sierra Leone. The campaign set out to fund the purchase of a 20 kW solar and storage system in order to provide uninterrupted power to a ward which incurred frequent power shortages resulting in equipment malfunctions and consequently unnecessary deaths.

The campaign was successful in reaching its target of £100,000 and the power system went live in September, 2018.

== Bibliography ==
- Michael, Liebreich (2011) "Time to Reflect, Refocus, Reinvigorate". "The Road to Rio+20: For a Development-Led Green Economy".
- Morgan, Bazilian, Andrew Rice, Juliana Rotich, Mark Howells, Joseph DeCarolis, Stuart MacMillan, Cameron Brooks, Florian Bauer, Michael Liebreich (October 2012). "Open source software and crowdsourcing for energy analysis". Energy Policy (Volume 49): 149–153.
- Morgan, Bazilian, Ijeoma Onyeji, Michael Liebreich, Ian MacGill, Jennifer Chase, Jigar Shah, Dolf Gielen, Doug Arent, Doug Landfear, Shi Zhengrong (May 2013). "Re-considering the economics of photovoltaic power". Renewable Energy (Volume 53): 329–338.
- Morgan, Bazilian, Mackay, Miller, Reid Detchon, Michael Liebreich (July 2013) "Accelerating the Global Transformation to 21st Century Power Systems". "The Electricity Journal" (Volume 26): 39–51.
- Michael, Liebreich (September 2013) "Green conservatism: protecting the environment through open markets". "Green Alliance".
- Michael, Liebreich (March 2014) "Clean energy needs less regulation, not more". "Responsibility & Resilience, Conservative Environment Network".
