= Herb Stock =

American football player (1899–1987)

Profile
- Positions: Halfback, defensive back, tailback, blocking back, fullback, linebacker, wingback

Personal information
- Born: September 3, 1899; Columbus, Ohio, U.S.
- Died: December 21, 1987 (aged 88); Columbus, Ohio, U.S.
- Listed height: 6 ft 0 in (1.83 m)
- Listed weight: 182 lb (83 kg)

Career information
- High school: Commerce (OH)
- College: Kenyon

Career history
- Columbus Tigers (1924); Ironton Tanks (1925–1927)

Career statistics
- Games played: 6–7
- Stats at Pro Football Reference

Herbert Louis Stock Sr. (September 3, 1899 – December 21, 1987) was an American football halfback who played one season in the National Football League (NFL) for the Columbus Tigers and three for the independent Ironton Tanks.

== Early life and education ==
Stock was born on September 3, 1899, in Columbus, Ohio. He attended Commerce High School in Ohio, along with three other people who would later play professionally. In 1918, he joined Kenyon College in Gambier, Ohio, where he attended one year before serving as a member of the United States Army during World War I. He returned to the school in 1920, and earned a varsity letter in the following three seasons. Following his junior year, Stock was unanimously elected team captain for the 1922 season. The Democratic Banner reported, "Herbert L. Stock of Columbus on Saturday was unanimously elected captain of the 1922 football team of Kenyon. Stock has completed his second year on the varsity and has been reckoned Ohio's best fullback by several noted sport authorities."

== Professional career ==
In 1924, two years after his last season of college football, Stock was given a position on the Columbus Tigers National Football League (NFL) team, becoming one of two Kenyon attendees ever to play professionally. He was given the team's starting halfback position, but he played several other positions as well, including defensive back, tailback, blocking back, fullback, linebacker, and wingback. In the season, he played in between 6 and 7 games, starting five. The Tigers finished 4–4 that season, and placed tenth in the NFL.

Following the season Stock left the Columbus Tigers, and joined the independent Ironton Tanks. He played the following three years with the team before retiring.

== Death ==
Stock died on December 21, 1987, in his hometown of Columbus, Ohio, at the age of 88.
