= Michael Dukmejian =

American magazine publisher

- Born: 1953 or 1954 (age 71–72)
- Education: New York University
- Occupation: Publisher

Michael Dukmejian (born 1953 or 1954) is an American magazine publisher. As of June 2009, he is the publisher of Bloomberg Markets magazine, reporting to Bloomberg News co-founder and editor-in-chief Matthew Winkler.

Dukmejian was executive vice president of SourceMedia before joining Bloomberg Markets, and led the Professional Services Division that included publications such as Financial Planner, On Wall Street and Employee Benefits News. Previously, he worked more than 26 years at Time Inc., which he joined in 1980, in a variety of roles in marketing, publishing and sales. His last position at Time Inc. was "group publisher of the Fortune and Money group" and of CNNMoney. Before that, he was publisher of Mutual Funds and Money magazines since 1999 and October 2002, respectively. He also held management positions at Sports Illustrated (in sales development), Fortune (in marketing) and Time (in advertising and business development) magazines.

Dukmejian is a director of Tri-Artisan Partners LLC and holds a Master of Business Administration with a specialization in finance from New York University's Stern School of Business and a bachelor's degree in political science from Stony Brook University.
