= The Giving Pledge =

Charitable campaign

- Formation: 2010; 16 years ago
- Type: Charitable organization
- Members: 256 (as of August 2025)
- Founders: Bill Gates; Warren Buffett; Melinda French Gates
- Website: givingpledge.org

The Giving Pledge is a charitable campaign, founded by Bill Gates, Melinda French Gates, and Warren Buffett, to encourage wealthy people to contribute a majority (i.e. more than 50%) of their wealth to philanthropic causes. As of October 2025, the pledge has more than 250 signatories from 30 countries. Most of the signatories of the pledge are billionaires, at a total of US$600 billion.

The campaign is intended to establish a social norm of charitable giving by the wealthy. In its early years, it was highly successful at attracting signatories, whereas the rate of new signatories has declined in recent years.

By 2026, Buffett's relationship with Bill Gates, who was acknowledged to have at one point had ties to Jeffrey Epstein, had become severely strained, with Buffett also severing his decades long partnership with the Gates Foundation.

== Description ==
The organization's stated goal is to inspire the wealthy people of the world to give at least half of their net worth to philanthropy, either during their lifetime or upon their death. The pledge is a public gesture of an intention to give, not a legal contract. On the Giving Pledge's website, each individual or couple writes a letter explaining why they chose to give. The pledge is open to non-billionaires who "plan to give away at least $500 million and are in a position to do so".

== History ==
In June 2010, the Giving Pledge campaign was formally announced and Bill Gates, Melinda French Gates, and Warren Buffett began recruiting members. As of August 2010, the aggregate wealth of the first 40 pledgers was $125 billion. 113 people signed the pledge in the first 5 years, 72 in the next 5 years, and 43 in the next 5 years. As of 2026, more than 250 families have signed the pledge.

FTX founder Sam Bankman-Fried was removed from the list in December 2022 following his arrest.

Banker T. Denny Sanford had his name removed from the list in May 2023 following the unsealing of court documents about his possible involvement with child pornography.

The Giving Pledge was cited as inspiration for the Jewish Future Pledge, a charitable campaign launched in 2020 to encourage American Jews to give at least half of their charitable giving to Jewish- or Israel-related causes.

Many pledge participants channel their philanthropy through private family foundations or donor-advised funds (DAFs) that they control, enabling immediate tax benefits while allowing disbursements over time. According to a 2025 report by the Institute for Policy Studies, roughly 80 percent of pledger contributions have gone to such intermediary organisations rather than directly to operating charities. Supporters argue this builds enduring endowments and professionalizes grantmaking, while critics contend it delays impact and preserves donor control, blurring the line between philanthropy and the maintenance of influence.

The initiative has also attracted criticism from journalists, watchdog groups, and members of the philanthropic sector for its voluntary and non-binding nature, which provides no mechanism to verify or enforce the fulfilment of commitments. Commentators note that some signatories may gain public recognition without necessarily donating the pledged share, and that many participants have seen their net worth increase since joining. According to a 2025 analysis by the Institute for Policy Studies, the 32 original U.S. pledgers who remain billionaires have collectively become about 166 percent wealthier since signing on in 2010. According to the study, just 8 of 22 pledgers who had since died actually gave away enough to meet the "half of wealth" pledge; the average deceased pledger gave away 43 percent of their wealth, either during their lifetimes or in their estates.

Right-wing billionaire Peter Thiel has been a staunch opponent of the Giving Pledge and has tried to persuade other billionaires not to sign it, or to undo their signatures. He has argued that the money would be better served going towards for-profit businesses instead. Brian Armstrong, CEO of the cryptocurrency firm Coinbase, signed the Giving Pledge in 2019, but rescinded his signature by 2024. A 2026 New York Times story reported that "the rate of signers has plummeted in recent years," citing a backlash against high-profile charitable giving among both the donors and the public, as well as revelations of Gates's ties to Jeffrey Epstein.

Buffett became distant from the Gates Foundation following the Gates' divorce, and transferred $500 million to each of his three children's charitable foundations instead of donating it directly. Tyler Cowen noted, "The fact that many wealthy individuals are now backing away from the pledge is a sign it was not an effective upfront commitment in the first place." In July 2026, Buffett, who was also acknowledged to have become estranged from The Giving Pledge co-founder Bill Gates, officially severed his decades-long partnership with the Gates Foundation in protest to Bill Gates' ties to Epstein, redirecting all money he had intended the Gates Foundation to inherit upon his death to four charities run by his family.

== List of notable pledgers ==
Net worth is as of 2024 for notable signers. A full list of pledgers is available online.

Name	Net worth in billion US$	Source of wealth	Industry	Year of pledge	Year of death	Amount donated
Elon Musk	852	Tesla, SpaceX	Electric vehicles, Rocketry	2012		$7.6 billion (2021–22)
Larry Ellison	231.8	Oracle	Tech	2010		$0.8 billion (est.)
Mark Zuckerberg	201.7	Meta Platforms	Tech	2010		$45 billion (est.)
Warren Buffett	146.8	Berkshire Hathaway	Finance & Investments	2010		$60 billion+
Michael Bloomberg	109.4	Bloomberg L.P.	Finance, Media	2010		$17 billion+
Bill Gates	105.1	Microsoft	Software, Tech	2010		$50 billion+
MacKenzie Scott	33.2	Amazon	Tech	2019		$19 billion
Jim Simons	31.4	Renaissance Technologies	Finance & Investments	2010	2024	$4 billion+
Vladimir Potanin	23.7	interros	Investment	2013		
Dustin Moskovitz	24.04	Facebook	Tech	2010		$2.6 billion
Carl Icahn	22	Icahn Enterprises	Finance & Investments	2010		
Pierre Omidyar	21.8	eBay	Tech	2010		
Andrew Forrest	20.8 (2023)	Fortescue	Mining	2013		
John Doerr	12.7	Kleiner Perkins	Finance & Investments	2010		
Azim Premji	12.3	Wipro	Tech	2013		$21 billion (est.)
Patrick Soon-Shiong	11.5	Abraxane, investments	Healthcare	2010		
Melinda French Gates	11.4	Microsoft	Tech	2010		
Jack Dangermond	9.2	ESRI	Geoinformatics, Environment	2016		
Brian Chesky	9.2	Airbnb	Tech	2022		
Cliff Obrecht and Melanie Perkins	9.2	Canva	Tech	2021		
George Lucas	8.59	Lucasfilm	Media	2010		
Nikhil Kamath	8	Zerodha	Finance & Investments	2023		
Charles Feeney	8	DFS Group	Luxury retail	2011	2023	$8 billion+
George Kaiser	7.6	Kaiser-Francis Oil Company	Energy	2010		
Judith Faulkner	7.5	Epic Systems	Tech	2015		
Yuri Milner	6.8	DST Global	Technology investing	2013		
Henry Samueli	6.7	Broadcom Corporation	Tech	2011		
Jeffrey Skoll	6.1	eBay	Tech	2010		
Reed Hastings	5.4	Netflix	Tech, Media	2012		
Mitchell and Emily Wei Rales	5.4	Danaher Corporation	Business	2019		
Bernard Marcus	4.5 to 6.1 (2019)	The Home Depot	Retail	2010	2024	$2.2 billion (est.)
Barron Hilton	4.5	Hilton Worldwide	Services	2010	2019	$3.6 billion (est.)
David Green	4.5	Hobby Lobby	Retail	2010		
Jeff Green	4.4	AdECN	Tech	2021		
Ronald Perelman	4.3	MacAndrews & Forbes	Finance & Investments	2010		
David Rubenstein	4.3	The Carlyle Group	Finance & Investments	2010		
Walter Scott Jr.	4.2	Berkshire Hathaway	Finance & Investments	2010	2021	$0.5-0.7 billion
Julian Robertson	4.1	Tiger Management	Finance & Investments	2010	2022	$2 billion+
Anil Agrawal	4	Vedanta Resources	Mining	2021		
Hemant Taneja	3.6	General Catalyst	Venture Capital	2024		
Thomas Secunda	3.6	Bloomberg L.P	Tech	2010		
B. R. Shetty	3.5	NMC Health	Healthcare	2018		
David Rockefeller	3.3	Standard Oil, inheritance	Energy	2010	2017	
Ken Langone	3.3	The Home Depot	Retail	2010		
Bill Ackman	2.8	Pershing Square Capital Management	Finance & Investments	2012		
Charles Zegar	2.8	Bloomberg L.P	Tech	2010		
Peter G. Peterson	2.8	Blackstone Group	Finance & Investments	2010	2018	
Garrett Camp	2.7	Uber	Tech	2017		
Brian Armstrong	2.6	Coinbase	Cryptocurrency	2018		
Ted Turner	2.4	Cable News Network	Media	2010	2026	
Herbert and Marion Sandler	2.4	Golden West Financial Corporation	Finance & Investments	2010		
Gerry Lenfest and Marguerite Lenfest	2.4	Lenfest Communications	Media	2010	2018	
T. Denny Sanford	2.2	First Premier Bank	Finance & Investments	2010		
Sam Altman	2	OpenAI, ChatGPT	Tech	2024		
James E. Stowers	2	Twentieth Century Mutual Funds	Finance & Investments	2010		
Tom Steyer	1.6	Farallon Capital	Finance & Investments	2010		
George P. Mitchell	1.6	Mitchell Energy & Development Corp	Energy	2010	2013	
Ted Forstmann	1.6	Forstmann Little & Company	Finance & Investments	2010	2011	
Jon Huntsman Sr.	1.5	Huntsman Corporation	Manufacturing	2010	2018	$1.5 billion+
Mark Pincus	1.4	Zynga	Tech	2022		
Sidney Kimmel	1.4	Jones Apparel Group	Fashion & Cosmetics	2010		
Irwin M. Jacobs	1.2	Qualcomm	Tech	2010		
Bernard Osher	1.1	Golden West Financial Corporation	Finance & Investments	2010		
Duncan MacMillan	1.1	Bloomberg L.P	Tech	2010		
Lorry I. Lokey	1	Business Wire	Media	2010	2022	
Sanford I. Weill	1 (2021)	Shearson Loeb Rhoades	Finance & Investments	2010		
John Morgridge	1	Cisco Systems	Tech	2010		
Tom Monaghan	1	Domino's Pizza	Food & Beverage	2010		
Lyda Hill	1	Hunt Oil Company, inheritance	Energy	2010		
Anne Wojcicki	0.8	23andMe	Genealogy	2022		$0.02 billion+ (2022)
Shelby White	0.6	Leon Levy, Odyssey Partners	Finance & Investments	2010		
T. Boone Pickens	0.5	Mesa Petroleum, BP Capital Management	Energy, Finance & Investments	2010	2019	$1 billion+
Marc Benioff	9.4	Salesforce	Tech	2016		

== See also ==
- Charity (practice)
- Charitable organization
- Earning to give
- Effective altruism
- List of members of the Forbes 400
- Philanthrocapitalism
- The World's Billionaires
- Venture philanthropy
- Giving What We Can
