= Bloomberg Markets =

Financial magazine

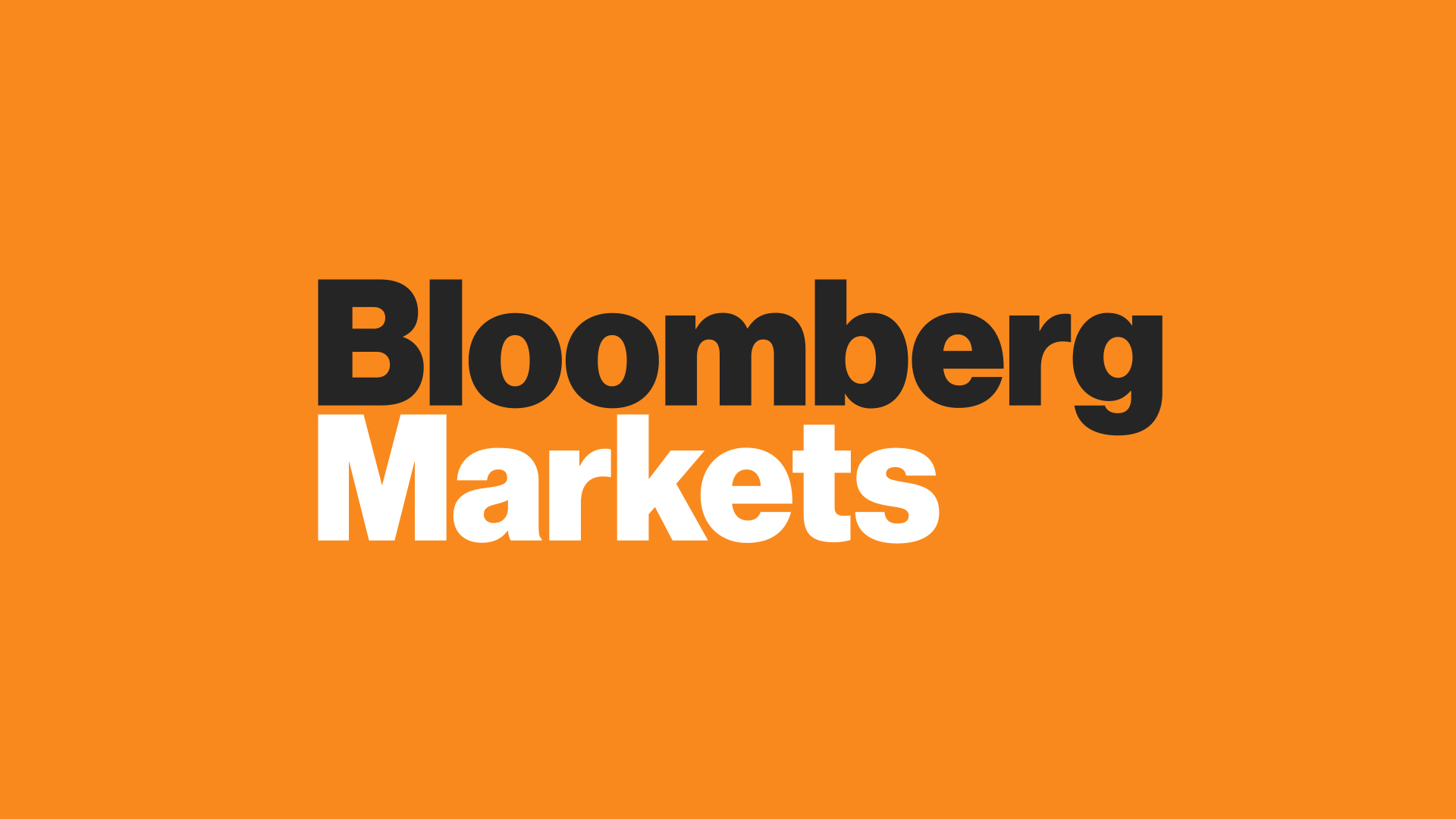

- Frequency: Bi-monthly
- Circulation: 375,000 per issue
- First issue: July 1992; 34 years ago
- Company: Bloomberg L.P.
- Country: United States
- Language: English
- Website: bloomberg.com/magazine

Bloomberg Markets is a magazine published six times a year by Bloomberg L.P. as part of Bloomberg News. Aimed at global financial professionals, Bloomberg Markets publishes articles on the people and issues related to global financial markets. Bloomberg Markets, which is based in New York City, has readers in 147 countries. More than half of its readers live outside the U.S.

As of December 2011, the magazine had a circulation of 375,000 and was available for sale at bookstores and selected newsstands. All subscribers of the Bloomberg Professional service and the Bloomberg Terminal also receive Bloomberg Markets as part of their subscription. Newsstand sales averaged 6,154 in 2010.

== History ==
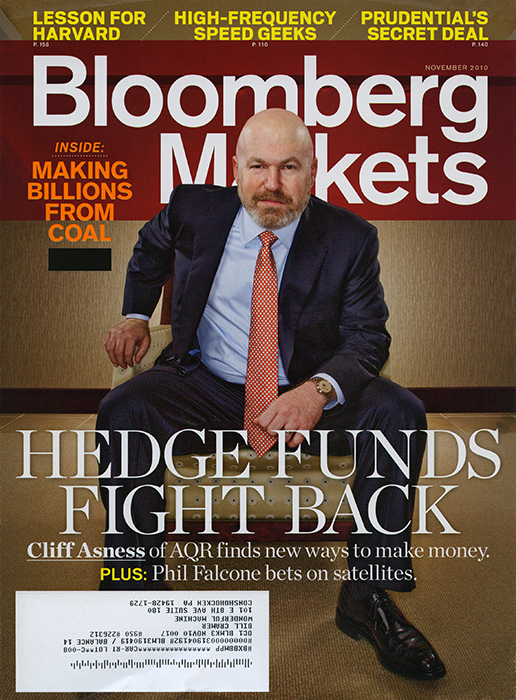
Cover of Bloomberg Markets Magazine in 2010

Bloomberg Markets was launched in July 1992 as "Bloomberg: A Magazine for Bloomberg Users" and was originally intended to be a guide for the Bloomberg Professional service. Although every issue included instructions for navigating terminal functions, content also included articles about financial markets aimed at portfolio managers, corporate executives, brokers, bankers and securities traders. William Inman served as Bloomberg Markets founding editor.

In 1999, the magazine became part of Bloomberg News and Ronald Henkoff became editor. Prior to joining Bloomberg Markets, Henkoff worked as a reporter and editor at Newsweek and Fortune. Henkoff was tapped by Bloomberg News chief Matt Winkler to bolster the magazine's feature writing, which had not been a focus of the publication. In 2000, the magazine's name was changed to Bloomberg Markets and became available on newsstands.

In fall 2010, Bloomberg Markets was redesigned in an effort to attract a broader array of advertisers and expand its content. The redesign, led by Bloomberg Markets editor Ronald Henkoff and publisher Michael Dukmejian and developed by the firm of Priest + Grace, gave the publication a new, more contemporary look. In April 2011, Bloomberg Markets hired its first creative director, Siung Tjia, the former creative director of ESPN The Magazine. In addition to design changes, the editors added regular coverage of careers and personal finance following a global survey of readers.

In addition to the redesign, Bloomberg Markets unveiled a trade advertising campaign to position itself as the leading publication for the "global financial elite" and increased its circulation rate base from 355,000 to 375,000 by December 2011. The campaign and shift in design lead to new advertising deals with luxury brands such as Range Rover, Goldman Sachs and Allianz. The ultimate goal, according to Dukmejian, is for Bloomberg Markets to reach a circulation of 450,000 with 15,000 on newsstands.

In June 2011, Bloomberg Markets announced the launch of the 50 Most Influential franchise, its list of the most influential people in global finance, which appeared in the October 2011 issue. To coincide with the issue, the magazine hosted the inaugural Bloomberg Markets 50 Summit, a day-long event, held in September 2011 in New York City. A second 50 Most Influential ranking was published in the magazine's October 2012 issue.

Bloomberg Markets would be testing a spin-off luxury title with a spring 2012 issue called Bloomberg Pursuits.

In October 2015, it was announced by the parent company that Bloomberg Markets would reduce publication from 11 issues a year to six.

=== Staff ===
Bloomberg Markets has a staff of editors in the U.S., Latin America, Europe and Asia. In addition, the magazine draws on contributions from journalists at Bloomberg News, a global news service with 146 bureaus in 72 countries.

== Honors and awards ==
Bloomberg Markets has won almost 200 journalism and design awards including a Gerald Loeb Award, a Scripps Howard Award and a George Polk Award. In 1995, the magazine was a finalist for the National Magazine Awards in the General Excellence category for magazines with a circulation under 100,000.

In 2006, editor Ron Henkoff won the Lawrence Minard Award as part of the Gerald Loeb Awards, which recognizes an editor whose career achievements and contributions to the profession of business, financial and economic journalism exemplify excellence in the area of editing.

In 2011, Bloomberg Markets was named a finalist for the American Society of Magazine Editors' General Excellence Award for Finance, Technology and Lifestyle Magazines and Bloomberg Markets senior writer David Evans was named a Pulitzer Prize finalist in the National Reporting category. Evans also received the 2011 John Chancellor Award given by Columbia Journalism School.

In 2012, Bloomberg Markets was made available in digital form for the iPad alongside its Businessweek subscription circulation.

== Notable stories and their impact ==
=== "Duping The Families of Fallen Soldiers" (September 2010) ===
Following a six-month investigation, David Evans's article revealed that life insurance companies were withholding billions of dollars in benefits from the families of slain soldiers and millions of other Americans. As a result of the article, the U.S. Department of Veterans Affairs required that Prudential offer the families of slain soldiers the option of receiving one check for the full amount of the death benefit. Evans was named as a finalist for the 2011 Pulitzer Prize for his article.

=== "Toxic Debt" (July 2007) ===
This three-story cover package revealed the complicit role of rating companies Moody's and Standard and Poor's in creating the complex mortgage-backed securities stuffed with subprime debt that triggered the 2008 financial crisis.

=== "Big Pharma's Shameful Secret" (December 2005) ===
The article revealed that poorly supervised clinical trials for potential new drugs often injure and kill participants. As a result of the magazine's expose, the largest clinical trial company in the U.S. ousted its three top managers and government authorities shut down its biggest test center.

=== "The Banks That Fleeced Alabama" (September 2005) ===
Bloomberg Markets magazine reported that a group of banks led by JPMorgan Chase had overcharged Jefferson County, home to Birmingham, by at least $60 million in fees assessed on $5.8 billion in complex contracts called Interest-rate swaps that the county used to finance a sewer system.

In October 2009, former Birmingham Mayor Larry Langford was convicted of taking bribes to steer a share of the JPMorgan deals to a local bank. As a result of the corruption, in November 2011, Jefferson County filed the largest municipal bankruptcy in U.S. history.
