= Duncan MacMillan (businessman) =

American mathematician, philanthropist and businessman

William Duncan MacMillan
- Born: 1938 (age 87–88); United States
- Education: Rutgers University (BS)
- Occupations: Mathematician, businessman, and philanthropist
- Known for: Co-founder of Bloomberg L.P.
- Spouse: Nancy MacMillan
- Children: 2, Kevin MacMillan, and Alissa MacMillan

Duncan MacMillan is an American mathematician, philanthropist, and businessman known for being one of the four founders of Bloomberg L.P.

== Early life and education ==
MacMillan served four years in the United States Marine Corps after which he went to college. In 1966, MacMillan earned a Bachelor of Science degree in Mathematics from Rutgers University. In 1967, he began his career working at Bankers Trust.

== Career ==
MacMillan worked at the investment bank Salomon Brothers with Michael Bloomberg, Thomas Secunda and Charles Zegar. After Bloomberg - who was Salomon's former head of equity trading and sales and then head of computer systems and data - was fired when he opposed the takeover of the company by Phibro, a metals trading company, he invited Zegar, Secunda, and Macmillan to start up their own financial data company. They accepted and together they founded Innovative Market Systems, with Bloomberg investing $300,000, the majority of seed capital. Secunda, who was a mathematician, was responsible for analytics; MacMillan was the expert in customer needs; and Zegar created the software.

In 1982, they got their first customer, Merrill Lynch who ordered 20 data terminals and invested $30 million in the company (receiving a 30 percent ownership interest). The company grew rapidly thereafter and by 2008 had $7.6B in sales and over 15,000 employees. Bloomberg owned 88% of the company and the three other partners 4% each (In 2008, Bloomberg purchased back Merrill Lynch's original 30% share).

== Philanthropy ==
MacMillan is a Member of the Dean's Advisory Committee; he is a member of the Foundation of The Medical Center at Princeton. He has endowed a Professorship of Genetics at Rutgers University and a Professorship in Theoretical Computer Science at The Institute for Advanced Study. He is also a generous supporter of The Cancer Institute of New Jersey where he serves on the board of directors. His wife Nancy is a trustee of the Institute for Advanced Study and the American Repertory Ballet. MacMillan and his wife are signatories of The Giving Pledge.

== Personal life ==
MacMillan is married to Nancy MacMillan whom he met while working at Bankers Trust. Nancy has a B.A. in economics and mathematics from Connecticut College, a M.A. in economics from Hunter College, and a Master of Business Administration in finance from Rider University. They have two children: Kevin and Alissa.
