= Peter Grauer =

American businessman and entrepreneur (born 1945)

Peter T. Grauer
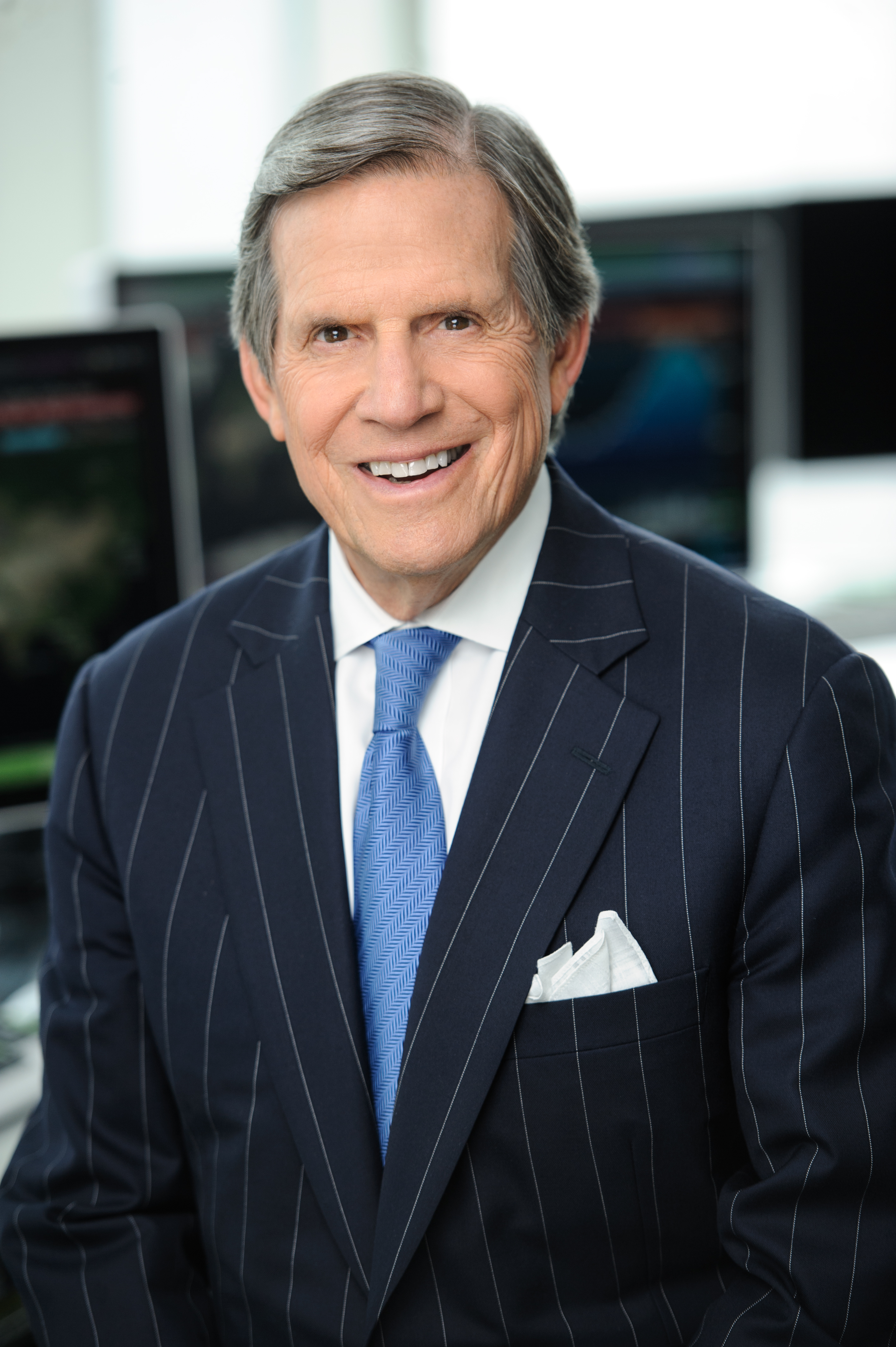
- Grauer in 2012
- Born: Peter Thacher Grauer; October 1945; Philadelphia, Pennsylvania, U.S.
- Education: University of North Carolina at Chapel Hill (BA); Harvard University
- Occupations: Former Chairman, Bloomberg L.P.
- Spouse: Laura McCord

Peter Thacher Grauer (born October 1945) is an American businessman. He has been a member of the Bloomberg L.P. board since October 1996 and was chairman of the board from 2001 to 2023. Grauer joined Bloomberg full-time in his executive capacities in March 2002. Prior to becoming a member of Bloomberg L.P. in 1996, Grauer was the founder of DLJ Merchant Banking Partners and Investment. He is the lead independent director of DaVita Inc.

== Personal life and education ==
Grauer was born in Philadelphia, Pennsylvania, in 1945 to Frederick R. Grauer and Frances Grauer (née Thacher). His father, Frederick, was a retiree who previously served as the vice president of the Provident National Bank in Philadelphia. Peter's maternal grandfather, Frank W. Thacher, was the president of the Florence Thread Co. in Riverside, New Jersey. He graduated from the University of North Carolina at Chapel Hill in 1968 with a BA in English, and Harvard Business School, Program for Management Development in 1975. He joined Delta Kappa Epsilon (Beta Chapter) while at UNC. Prior to Chapel Hill, Peter graduated from Hotchkiss School.

== Professional career ==
Currently, Peter Grauer is chairman of the board of Bloomberg L.P. Prior to his time at Bloomberg L.P., Grauer was the managing director and senior partner of the investment bank Donaldson Lufkin & Jenrette from September 1992 to November 2000, when DLJ was acquired by Credit Suisse First Boston. He was also the founder of DLJ Merchant Banking Partners and DLJ Investment Partners. Grauer serves as a director or trustee on a range of professional and charitable boards. He has served on the boards of more than 25 public and private companies. He has been a director of DaVita Inc. since 1994 and the lead independent director since 2003.

Grauer is a member of the board of the Prostate Cancer Foundation. He also serves as president of the board of trustees of the Inner City Scholarship Fund in New York City. In June 2013, Grauer was appointed an Independent Non-Executive Director of Glencore plc, later rising to Senior Independent Non-Executive Director in May 2014. He retired from the board in 2018.

In 2014, Grauer became the founding chairman of the American chapter of the 30% Club, an international organization aimed at increasing women's representation on corporate boards.

Previously, Grauer served on the global advisory board of Out Leadership, which partners with senior executives to advance LGBT equality. OutStanding and the Financial Times named Grauer #4 in their 2015 list of Leading LGBT & Ally Executives, citing his active commitment to LGBT workplace inclusion in Bloomberg LP's global offices.

Grauer sits on the boards of several prominent educational institutions. He serves as the Founding Board Chair of College Advising Corps, a national nonprofit organization that supports low-income, first generation students on the path to college. He is also a member of both the board of trustees of Rockefeller University, a global center for scientific research and education, and the Emeritus Board of literacy and education nonprofit Room to Read. Grauer currently serves as the chairman emeritus of Big Apple Circus, an award-winning New York circus performing company and community outreach organization.

Grauer is a former member of the board of trustees of the University of North Carolina at Chapel Hill and chairman of the external advisory board of the Undergraduate Honors Program, as well as a member of the University of North Carolina at Chapel Hill Foundation Board and the UNC Global Research Institute Board. Additionally, Grauer is the former president of the Pomfret School board of trustees. In 2015, Grauer voted against changing the name of Saunders Hall at the University of North Carolina at Chapel Hill when an objection was raised concerning William Saunders's prominent Ku Klux Klan activity.

Grauer also serves as an advisor to multiple global business institutions. Grauer sits on the advisory board of McKinsey & Company, a global management consulting firm. He is a member of the international advisory board of BritishAmerican Business, a transatlantic business network connecting leaders in New York and London. In June 2016, multinational investment firm Blackstone Group appointed Grauer to its board of directors. Grauer left Blackstone board in February 2018 because of the appearance and potential of a conflict posed by Blackstone's $17.3bn deal for the financial terminals and data unit of Bloomberg rival Thomson Reuters.

=== Bloomberg ===
Grauer met the founder of Bloomberg L.P., Michael Bloomberg, during equestrian shows both their daughters participated in. It was not until 1996 that Grauer was asked to become a member of the Bloomberg L.P. board of directors where he was later named chairman of the board in March 2001, succeeding Michael Bloomberg.

Despite the economic downturn in 2007, Grauer has been credited with bolstering the workforce at Bloomberg L.P., adding nearly 1,000 employees in 2009. Additionally, while chairman of Bloomberg L.P, Grauer led the company to purchase Bloomberg BusinessWeek from McGraw-Hill being quoted as saying he would like Bloomberg to become, ‘the most influential source of news for the financial and business community.”

In July 2011, Daniel L. Doctoroff was promoted to Bloomberg L.P.’s chief executive officer and assumed majority responsibility of the company from Grauer, who remained chairman and to whom Doctoroff continued to report. Following Doctoroff's departure from the company in September 2014, Mike Bloomberg resumed overall leadership of Bloomberg L.P., with support from Grauer and Tom Secunda.

In 2019, Grauer ranked in the top 10 of the 2019 HERoes Advocate Executives List.
