= Charles Zegar =

American businessman and computer programmer

Charlie Zegar
- Born: Charles Zegar; 1948 (age 77–78); New York City, New York, U.S.
- Education: Long Island University (BA); New York University (MS)
- Known for: Co-founder of Bloomberg L.P.
- Spouse(s): Merryl S. Zegar (m. 2001)

Charlie Zegar (born 1948) is an American businessman and computer programmer known for being one of the four co-founders of Bloomberg L.P.

== Early life and education ==
Zegar was born to a Jewish family in New York City, the son of Lillian, a musical comedy performer and opera singer, and Henry Zegar, a subway conductor for the New York City Transit Authority.

He earned a Bachelor of Arts and Science from Long Island University and a master's degree in computer science from New York University.

== Career ==
Zegar is one of the four founding partners of Innovative Market Systems (later renamed Bloomberg L.P.), which was established in 1982. The other founders were Michael Bloomberg, Tom Secunda, and Duncan MacMillan. Zegar met Bloomberg while both were working at Salomon Brothers. Zegar initially led Bloomberg's software development efforts.

In 2020, he was ranked No. 353 in the Forbes 400 list of the richest people in America.

=== Philanthropy ===
Zegar is a signatory of The Giving Pledge. He also established the Zegar Family Foundation. Zegar is on the board of trustees for New York University

== Personal life ==
Zegar has been married twice. He is widowed from his first wife. He remarried in 2001 to administrative judge, Merryl Snow. The service was officiated by Rabbi Joel Goor and took place at the Essex House in Manhattan.
