= Matthew Winkler (journalist) =

American journalist

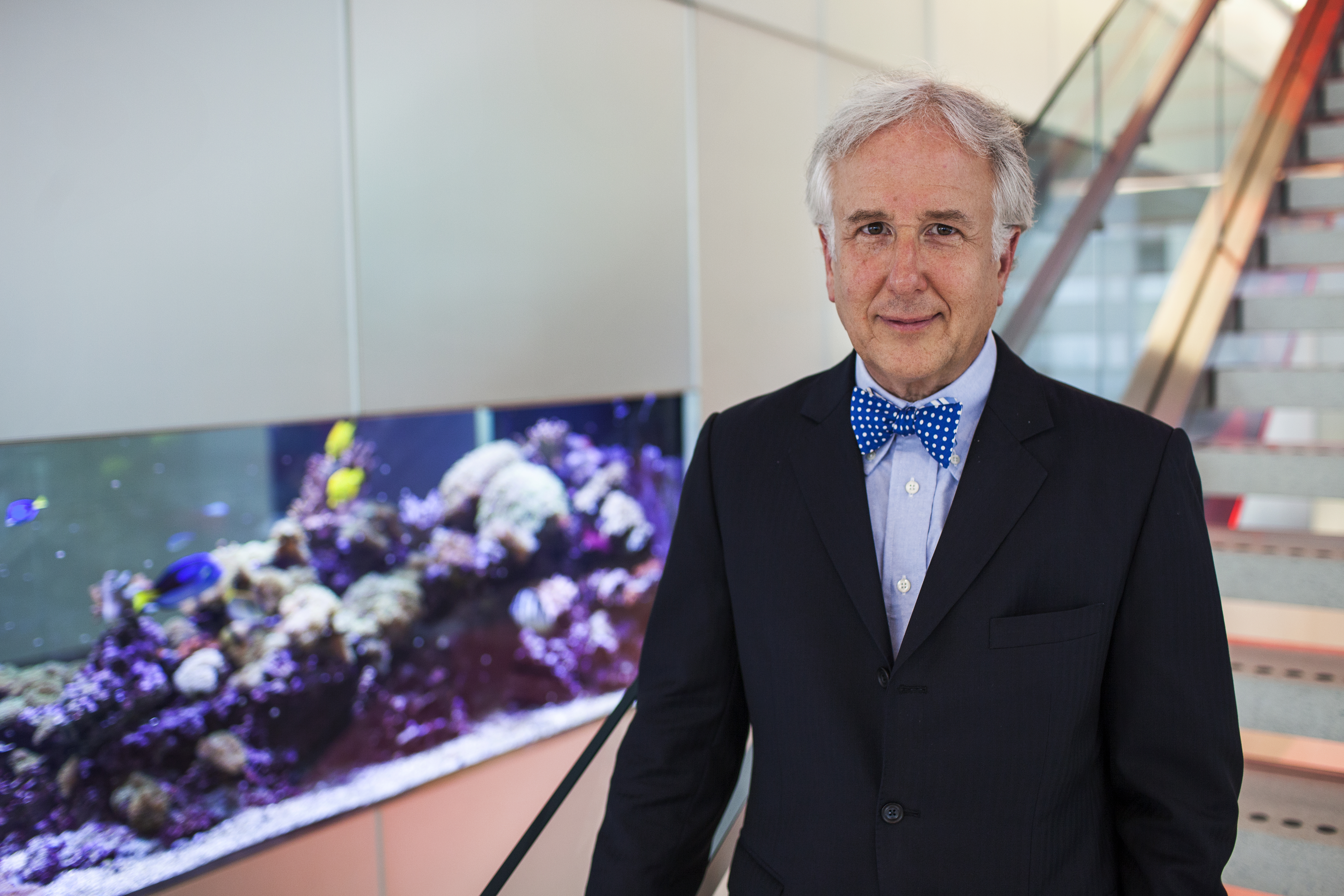
- Born: June 1, 1955 (age 71); New York City, U.S.
- Education: Kenyon College (BA)
- Occupation: Editor-in-Chief of Bloomberg News
- Spouse: Lisa Klein Winkler

Matthew Winkler (born June 1, 1955) is an American journalist who is a co-founder and former editor-in-chief of Bloomberg News, part of Bloomberg L.P. He is also co-author of Bloomberg by Bloomberg and the author of The Bloomberg Way: A Guide for Reporters and Editors.

== Early life and education ==
Winkler was born June 1, 1955, in New York City and was raised in Grand View-on-Hudson, New York. He attended Kenyon College, where he received a bachelor's degree in history and later, an honorary doctorate of laws.

== Career ==
Winkler began his journalism career at the Kenyon Collegian and later, at a local paper, the Mount Vernon News while he was a student at Kenyon College. Following his years at the Mount Vernon News, Winkler worked as a New York-based reporter and assistant editor at The Bond Buyer. Between 1980 and 1990, Winkler was a reporter in London and New York for The Wall Street Journal, a reporter for Barron's, and the founding editor/reporter for the Dow Jones Capital Markets Report. Between 1991 and 1994, he wrote the Capital Markets column for Forbes magazine.

=== Bloomberg News ===
After working at The Wall Street Journal for 10 years, Winkler left in 1990 when he co-founded Bloomberg News with Michael Bloomberg and became its editor-in-chief. Founded to provide financial bulletins to augment Bloomberg terminal service, Bloomberg News has since grown to include a wire service, a global television network, radio station, website, subscription-only newsletters and two magazines, Bloomberg Businessweek and Bloomberg Markets. In 2011, Bloomberg News included more than 2,300 editors and reporters in 72 countries and 146 news bureaus worldwide.

In 1997, Winkler partnered with Michael Bloomberg to write his autobiography, Bloomberg by Bloomberg. The book chronicles the development of Bloomberg, L.P., from niche financial data provider in 1981 to global financial information services and media company 15 years later.

Under Winkler, the organization won the 2015 Pulitzer for Explanatory Reporting with Zachary Mider’s "painstaking, clear and entertaining explanation of how so many U.S. corporations dodge taxes and why lawmakers and regulators have a hard time stopping them."

==== The Bloomberg Way ====
Winkler is known for his enforcement of the "Bloomberg Way," which includes a 300 plus-page guide outlining Bloomberg News reporting standards and its ethics and values. Reporters following the "Bloomberg Way" are instructed to consider the "Five Fs": factual word, first word, fastest word, final word and future word.

== Awards and honors ==
Winkler received the 2003 New York Financial Writers' Association Elliot V. Bell Award for making a "significant long-term contribution to the advancement of financial journalism." In 2007, Winkler was awarded the National Academy of Television Arts and Sciences Emmy Lifetime Achievement Award for business and financial reporting and the Gerald Loeb Foundation Lifetime Achievement Award, which recognizes individuals whose careers exemplify "consistent and superior insight and professional skills" to further the understanding of business, finance and the economy. He received the National Council for Research on Women Award in 2010, which recognizes "leaders who are making a difference for women in business, government, higher education, communications and across sectors." In 2012, Winkler was honored with the Lifetime Achievement Award in Journalism by the Craig Newmark Graduate School of Journalism at the City University of New York. And in 2014, the Los Angeles Press Club recognized Winkler and Michael Bloomberg with the President's Award for Impact on Media.

Winkler serves on the board of directors of the International Women's Media Foundation (IWMF), the Committee to Protect Journalists (CPJ), the International Center for Journalists (ICFJ), and Bloomberg L.P. He also serves on the board of trustees for both Kenyon College and the Kenyon Review.

== Personal life ==
Winkler is married to Lisa Klein Winkler. The couple has three children and lives in New Jersey.
