= Morgan Bazilian =

American professor

Morgan D. Bazilian
- Morgan Bazilian giving US Senate testimony in 2019
- Education: University of Michigan; University of Colorado Boulder; Murdoch University; University of New South Wales (PhD)
- Known for: Energy analysis, national security, critical minerals, international affairs
- Scientific career
- Workplaces: Colorado School of Mines, World Bank, National Renewable Energy Laboratory, United Nations, Irish Government

Morgan D. Bazilian is an American-Irish scholar. He is the director of the Payne Institute for Public Policy, and a professor of public policy at the Colorado School of Mines. His research focuses on energy security, minerals supply chains, infrastructure investment, national security, and international affairs. He has published over 230 articles in learned journals. His book, Analytical Methods for Energy Diversity and Security is the first to establish a wide variety of mathematical approaches to the topic, and his work on energy and poverty is likewise foundational for that field. He has been published in both Science (journal) and Nature (journal) on multiple occasions.

== Education ==
Bazilian has a bachelor's degree from the University of Michigan, a master's degree in thermal physics from the University of Colorado Boulder, a master's degree in applied physics from Murdoch University in Western Australia, and a PhD in energy systems and thermodynamics from University of New South Wales (2002).

== Career ==
In 2001, Bazilian was a Fulbright Fellow at SINTEF in Norway. From 2002 to 2007, Bazilian worked as the inaugural head of energy policy and at the Sustainable Energy Authority of Ireland. Following this, he became a political appointee and senior advisor on Energy Security to the Irish Ministry of Energy under Eamon Ryan. In 2008, Bazilian was the lead negotiator for the European Union on technology at the United Nations Framework Convention on Climate Change climate negotiations. In 2009, he became special advisor on energy access to the Director-General of United Nations Industrial Development Organization, and helped to develop the United Nations Sustainable Energy For All Initiative while leading the UN-Energy program. In 2011, he began working as the deputy director of the Joint Institute on Strategic Energy Analysis at the U.S. National Renewable Energy Laboratory. From 2014 to 2018, he was a World Bank lead energy specialist.

He is currently a professor of public policy at the Colorado School of Mines, and is the inaugural director of the Payne Institute for Public Policy. He is a member of the Council on Foreign Relations, the World Economic Forum’s Global Advisory Council on Energy, a fellow of the Energy and Security Program at the Center for Strategic and International Studies, an advisor for the Energy and Defense Initiative at the Atlantic Council, and a member of the Global Advisory Council of the Sustainable Finance Programme at Oxford University. He holds or has held academic affiliations at International Institute for Applied Systems Analysis, Columbia University, the Royal Institute of Technology, Cambridge University, and University College Cork. In 2021, he was appointed to Ireland's Climate Change Advisory Council. He is a board member of the Veterans Advanced Energy Project.

Dr. Bazilian has testified for both the United States Senate and the United States House of Representatives, as well as governing bodies of Ireland and the European Union. He sits on several tech and finance company Advisory Boards, such as: Air Capture, Capsol Technologies, and Nomadic Ventures.

== Early life ==
Prior to his career in energy and security, Bazilian was a professional mountain guide on Mount Rainier and Denali for Rainier Mountaineering and International Mountain Guides, and became the 10th American to summit the world's 6th tallest peak - Cho Oyu. He is also a published poet. As a boy, he started a garage band - Prophets of the Void - with Grammy winner Brad Mehldau.

== Bibliography ==
=== Books edited ===
- (co-editor with Fabien A Roques) Analytical Methods for Energy Diversity and Security: Portfolio Optimization in the Energy Sector: A Tribute to the work of Dr. Shimon Awerbuch (Elsevier Global Energy Policy and Economics Series). (Elsevier Science, 2008). ISBN 9780080915319

=== Academic Publications ===
- Nussbaumer, P., Bazilian, M. & Modi, V. Measuring energy poverty: Focusing on what matters. Renewable Sustainable Energy Rev. (2012).
- Bazilian, M., Nussbaumer, P. & Rogner, H. H. Energy access scenarios to 2030 for the power sector in sub-Saharan Africa. Utilities Policy (2012).
- Bazilian, M., Rogner, H., Howells, M., Hermann, S. & Arent, D. Considering the energy, water and food nexus: Towards an integrated modelling approach. Energy Policy (2011).
- Bazilian, M., Onyeji, I., Liebreich, M., MacGill, I. & Chase, J. Re-considering the economics of photovoltaic power. Renewable Energy (2013).
- Bazilian, M., Nakhooda, S. & Van de Graaf, T. Energy governance and poverty. Energy Research & Social (2014).
- Heath, G. A., O’Donoughue, P., Arent, D. J. & Bazilian, M. Harmonization of initial estimates of shale gas life cycle greenhouse gas emissions for electric power generation. Proceedings of the National Academy of Sciences of the United States of America 111, E3167–76 (2014).
- Bazilian, M., Bradshaw, M., Goldthau, A. & Westphal, K. Model and manage the changing geopolitics of energy. Nature 569, pages 29–31 (2019).
- Sovacool, B. K., Ali, S., Bazilian, et al. Sustainable minerals and metals for a low-carbon future. Science 367, pages 30–33 (2020).

=== Commentaries ===
- Bazilian, M. D. Power to the Poor. Foreign Affairs (2019).
- Jaffe, A. M., Iversen, L. & Bazilian, M. D. How Mini-Grids Can Power Disaster Recovery. Foreign Affairs (2017).
- Morgan D. Bazilian, P. M. New Oil Finds Could Mean a Tripling of Guyana's GDP. Foreign Policy (2019).
- Bazilian, M. D. We Need to Get Serious about ‘Critical Materials’. Scientific American (2019).
- Puliti, R. & Bazilian, M. D. How a Key Energy Technology Can Help Developing Countries. Scientific American (2019).
