= Thomas Secunda =

American billionaire businessman

- Born: 1954 (age 71–72); Bethpage, New York, U.S.
- Education: Binghamton University (BS, MS)
- Occupations: Co-founder & vice chairman, Bloomberg L.P.
- Spouse: Cynthia Cohen Secunda
- Children: 2

Thomas Secunda (born 1954) is an American billionaire businessman, best known as one of the four co-founders of Bloomberg L.P. and its vice chairman. As of May 2025, his net worth is estimated at US$5.4 billion.

== Early life ==
Thomas Secunda was born in 1954 in Bethpage, New York. He graduated from Binghamton University with bachelor's and master's degrees in mathematics. He is Jewish.

== Career ==
Beginning his career as a programmer, Thomas Secunda worked as a fixed-income trader at Morgan Stanley, as well as a systems researcher at Salomon Brothers, where he worked alongside future co-founder of Bloomberg L.P. and Mayor of New York City Michael Bloomberg.

In 1982, Secunda joined his former Salomon Brothers colleagues Michael Bloomberg, Duncan MacMillan, and Charles Zegar to set up Innovative Market Systems, later renamed Bloomberg L.P. in 1987. He serves as the global head of Bloomberg’s Financial Products and Services where his primary responsibility is to help Bloomberg develop new features and tools for the Bloomberg Professional service, the company’s primary product, driving 85 percent of its estimated $7 billion in revenue. As head of Financial Products, Secunda oversees a global staff of 6,000. In July 2011, Secunda was appointed vice chairman of Bloomberg L.P.

In addition to being one of the four co-founders of Bloomberg L.P., Secunda sits on the board of directors.

== Philanthropy ==
Secunda and his wife Cindy are signatories of the Giving Pledge. The beneficiaries of the couple's charitable giving are primarily organizations that focus on "National Parks, local parks, conservation, healthcare and Jewish causes." In 2012, he was awarded the Simon Wiesenthal Center's award for his philanthropic work. He is one of the major donors to Empire AI, a consortium started by the New York state legislature in which top public and private academic institutions from the state will have access to the hardware that is supposed to enable them to "address the growing imbalance in computing power between industry and academe and to orient the future of AI development toward the public good."

=== Political activity ===
According to Branko Marcetic in Jacobin, Secunda and his wife donated a combined $95,000 to Kathy Hochul in 2022.

== Personal life ==
Secunda lives with his wife, Cynthia "Cindy" Cohen, who is also Jewish, and their two daughters in Croton-on-Hudson, New York.
