= Bloomberg L.P. =

American financial, software, data, and media company

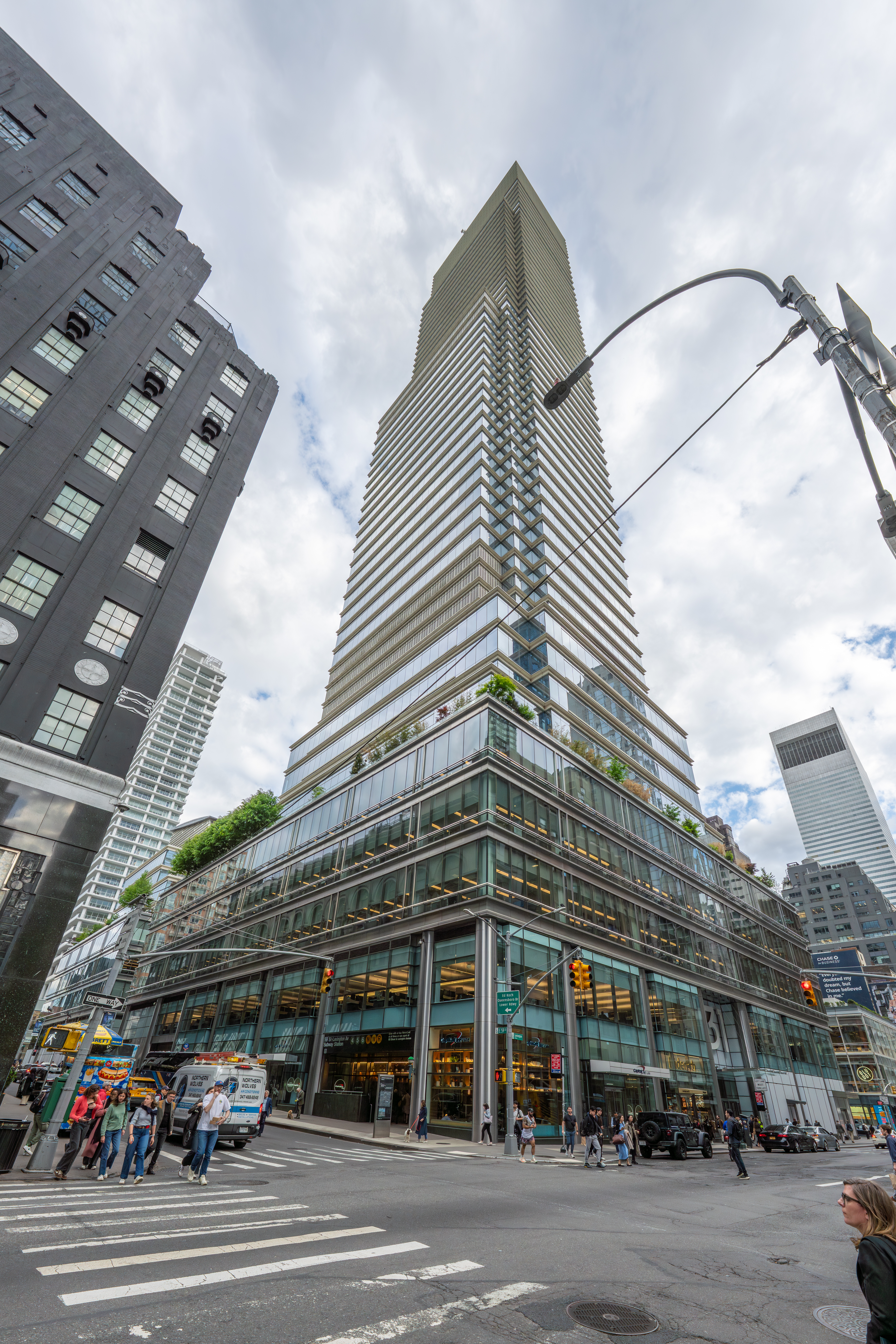
- Bloomberg Tower on Lexington Avenue in Midtown Manhattan
- Formerly: Innovative Market Systems (1981–1986)
- Type: Private
- Industry: Technology, financial technology, mass media
- Founded: October 1, 1981; 45 years ago
- Founders: Michael Bloomberg; Thomas Secunda; Duncan MacMillan; Charles Zegar
- Headquarters: Bloomberg Tower; 731 Lexington Avenue; New York, NY 10022; U.S.
- Number of locations: 176 offices (2025)
- Area served: Worldwide
- Key people: Vlad Kliatchko (CEO); Jean-Paul Zammitt (president); Michael Bloomberg (CEO, 1981–2001; 2014–2023); Peter Grauer (chair, 2001–2023)
- Revenue: ▲US$15 billion (2024)
- Owner: Michael Bloomberg (88%)
- Number of employees: 26,000
- Website: bloomberg.com

Bloomberg L.P. is an American privately held financial, software, data, and media company headquartered in Midtown Manhattan, New York City. It was co-founded by Michael Bloomberg in 1981, with Thomas Secunda, Duncan MacMillan, Charles Zegar, and a 12% ownership investment by Merrill Lynch.

Bloomberg L.P. provides financial software tools and enterprise applications such as analytics and an equity trading platform, data services, and news to financial companies and organizations through the Bloomberg Terminal (via its Bloomberg Professional Service), its core revenue-generating product. Bloomberg L.P. also includes a news agency (Bloomberg News), a global television network (Bloomberg Television), websites, radio stations (Bloomberg Radio), subscription-only newsletters, and two magazines: Bloomberg Businessweek and Bloomberg Markets.

As of 2019, the company has 176 locations and nearly 20,000 employees.

== History ==
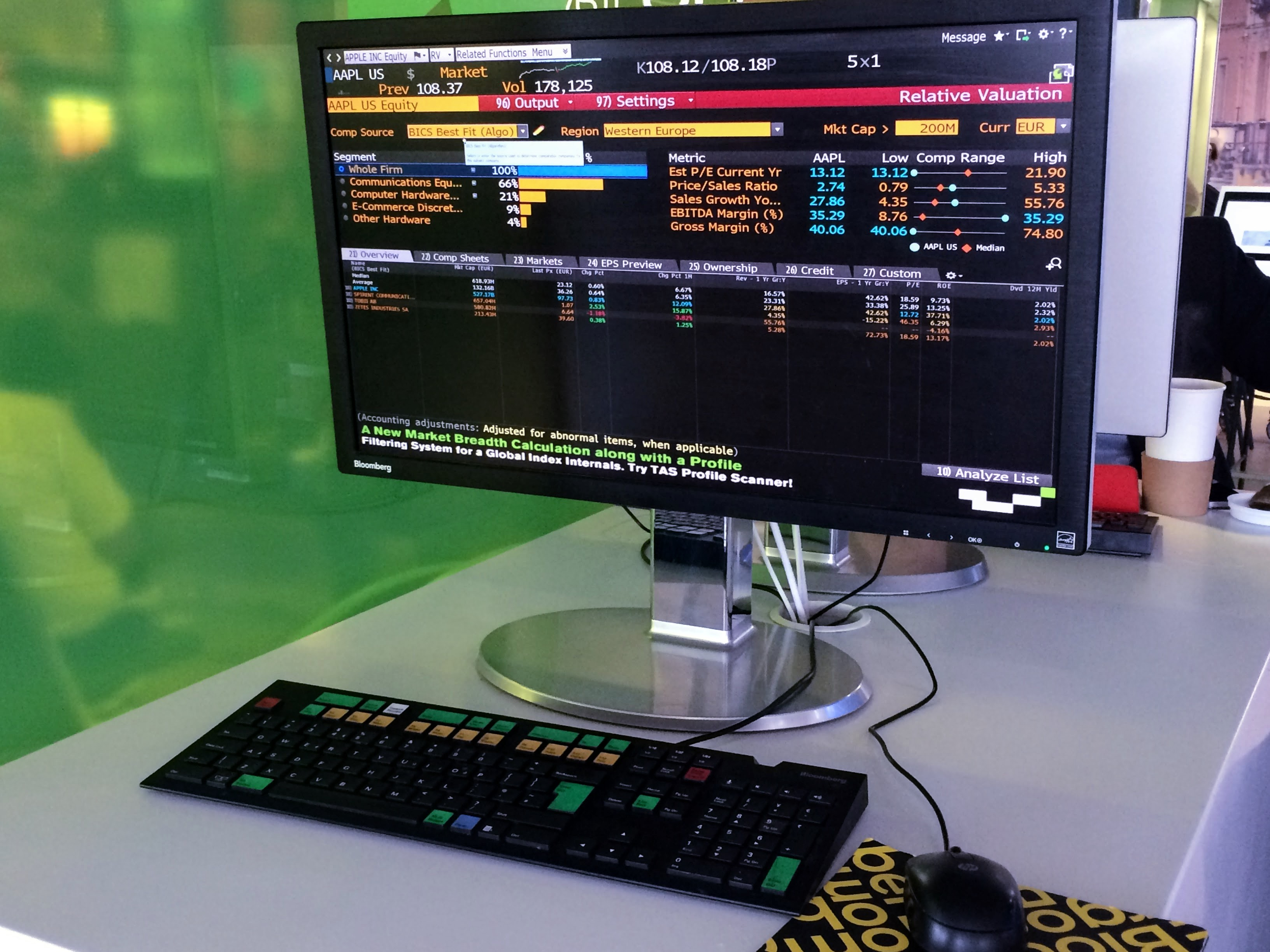
Bloomberg Terminal at London City Airport

In 1981, Salomon Brothers was acquired, and Michael Bloomberg, a general partner, was given a $10 million partnership settlement. Bloomberg, having designed in-house computerized financial systems for Salomon, used his $10 million partnership buyout to start Innovative Market Systems (IMS). Bloomberg developed and built his own computerized system to provide real-time market data, financial calculations and other financial analytics to Wall Street firms. The Market Master terminal, later called the Bloomberg Terminal, was released to market in December 1982. Merrill Lynch became the first customer, purchasing 20 terminals and a 30% equity stake in the company for $30 million in exchange for a five-year restriction on marketing the terminal to Merrill Lynch's competitors. Merrill Lynch released IMS from this restriction in 1984.

In 1986, the company renamed itself Bloomberg L.P. (limited partnership). Bloomberg launched Bloomberg Business News, later Bloomberg News, in 1990, with Matthew Winkler as editor-in-chief. Bloomberg.com was first established on September 29, 1993, as a financial portal with information on markets, currency conversion, news and events, and Bloomberg Terminal subscriptions.

In late 1996, Bloomberg bought back one-third of Merrill Lynch's 30 percent stake in the company for $200 million, valuing the company at $2 billion. In 2008, facing losses during the financial crisis, Merrill Lynch agreed to sell its remaining 20 percent stake in the company back to Bloomberg Inc., majority-owned by Michael Bloomberg, for a reported $4.43 billion, valuing Bloomberg L.P. at approximately $22.5 billion.

Bloomberg L.P. has remained a private company since its founding, the majority of which is owned by billionaire Michael Bloomberg. To run for the position of Mayor of New York against Democrat Mark Green in 2001, Bloomberg gave up his position of CEO and appointed Lex Fenwick as CEO in his stead. In 2012, Peter Grauer became the chairman of the company, a role he still holds. In 2008, Fenwick became the CEO of Bloomberg Ventures, a new venture capital division and Daniel Doctoroff, former deputy mayor in the Bloomberg administration, was named president and CEO, serving until September 2014. At that point, it was announced that Michael Bloomberg would be taking the reins of his eponymous market data company from Doctoroff, who was chief executive of Bloomberg for the past six years after his term as deputy mayor.

In May 2022, Bloomberg announced it would launch a new venture in the UK, Bloomberg UK, as part of a wider international strategy. Bloomberg UK plans to hire in the region and has launched a standalone website, a weekly video series, a podcast and new event series.

In August 2023, Michael Bloomberg announced a series of leadership changes for the company, with Chief Product Officer Vlad Kliatchko assuming the role of CEO and Chief Operating Officer Jean-Paul Zammitt assuming the role of President. He also announced a new board of directors which would be chaired by Mark Carney, taking over from Peter Grauer and that existing board members would move to "Emeritus Status". Mark Carney resigned from his chairmanship shortly before becoming the Prime Minister of Canada.

== Senior leadership ==
=== List of chairs ===
1. Michael Bloomberg (1981–2001)
2. Peter Grauer (2001–2023)
3. Mark Carney (2023–2025)

=== List of chief executives ===
1. Michael Bloomberg (1981–2001)
2. Alexius "Lex" Fenwick (2001–2008)
3. Daniel Doctoroff (2008–2014)
4. Michael Bloomberg (2014–2023)
5. Vlad Kliatchko (2023–present)

== Acquisitions ==
Since its founding, Bloomberg L.P. has made several acquisitions including the radio station WNEW, BusinessWeek magazine, research company New Energy Finance, the Bureau of National Affairs and the financial software company Bloomberg PolarLake. On July 9, 2014, Bloomberg L.P. acquired RTS Realtime Systems, a global provider of low-latency connectivity and trading support services. On August 13, 2019, Bloomberg acquired RegTek.Solutions in a move to expand its suite of regulatory reporting and data management services.

On March 13, 2023, Bloomberg entered into agreement to acquire Broadway Technology, a provider of high-performance trading systems and fixed income trading solutions.

=== Bloomberg Radio (formerly WNEW) ===
In 1992, Bloomberg L.P. purchased New York Radio station WNEW for $13.5 million. The station was converted into an all-news format, known as Bloomberg Radio, and the call letters were changed to WBBR.

=== Bloomberg Businessweek (formerly BusinessWeek) ===
Bloomberg L.P. bought a weekly business magazine, BusinessWeek, from McGraw-Hill in 2009. The company acquired the magazine—which was suffering from declining advertising revenue and limited circulation numbers—to attract general business to its media audience composed primarily of terminal subscribers. Following the acquisition, BusinessWeek was renamed Bloomberg Businessweek. In 2018, Joel Weber was named editor of the magazine.

=== New Energy Finance ===
In 2009, Bloomberg L.P. purchased New Energy Finance, a data company focused on energy investment and carbon markets research based in the United Kingdom. New Energy Finance was created by Michael Liebreich in 2004, to provide news, data and analysis on carbon and clean energy markets. Bloomberg L.P. acquired the company to become an industry resource for information to support low-carbon energy development. It was renamed Bloomberg New Energy Finance or BNEF for short. Liebreich continued to lead the company, serving as the chief executive officer until 2014, when he stepped down as CEO but remained involved as chairman of the advisory board.

BloombergNEF has expanded its research areas to cover renewable energy, advanced transport, digital industry, innovative materials, sustainability and commodities. BNEF provides research, long-term forecasts, analytical tools and global in-depth analysis covering a wide range of energy and related industries. Analysts covering 6 continents publish more than 700 research reports a year.

=== Bureau of National Affairs (BNA) ===
Bloomberg L.P. purchased Arlington, Virginia-based Bureau of National Affairs in August 2011, for $990 million to bolster its existing Bloomberg Government and Bloomberg Law services. BNA publishes specialized online and print news and information for professionals in business and government. The company produces more than 350 news publications in topic areas that include corporate law and business, employee benefits, employment and labor law, environment, health and safety, health care, human resources, intellectual property, litigation, and tax and accounting.

=== Bloomberg PolarLake ===
In May 2012, Bloomberg L.P. acquired Dublin-based software provider PolarLake and launched a new enterprise data management service to help companies acquire, manage, and distribute data across its organizations.

=== Barclays indices business ===
On December 16, 2015, it was announced that Barclays had agreed to sell its index business, Barclays Risk Analytics and Index Solutions Ltd (BRAIS), to Bloomberg L.P. for £520 million, or about $787 million. The company will be renamed Bloomberg Index Services Limited.

=== Bloomberg sports analysis ===
In September 2014, Bloomberg sold its Bloomberg Sports analysis division to the data analysis firm STATS LLC (now Stats Perform) for a fee rumored to be between $15 million and $20 million.

=== CityLab ===
On December 10, 2019, Bloomberg Media announced that it has reached an agreement to acquire CityLab, The Atlantic's news site covering transportation, environment, equity, life, and design. This was Bloomberg's first acquisition of an editorial property by the news and financial data company in over a decade.

=== RegTek.Solutions ===
In August 2019, Bloomberg L.P. acquired RegTek.Solutions, a provider of regulatory reporting software. RegTek.Solutions' technology was integrated with Bloomberg's Regulatory Reporting Hub, enterprise data management, and trading systems. Financial terms of the acquisition were not disclosed.

=== Second Measure ===
Bloomberg acquired Second Measure in December 2020. Second Measure analyzed billions of anonymized consumer transactions to provide data about company performance and consumer behavior. VentureBeat reported that the financial terms weren't disclosed and described Bloomberg's interest in the company's alternative-data capabilities.

Bloomberg later described the acquisition as the beginning of its alternative-data strategy and said Second Measure's transaction data became part of its Bloomberg Terminal alternative-data offering.

=== Broadway Technology ===
In February 2023, Bloomberg L.P. agreed to acquire Broadway Technology, a provider of high-performance financial technology and electronic trading systems. The transaction was reviewed by competition authorities, including the UK's Competition and Markets Authority. Bloomberg completed the acquisition in October 2023 and combined Broadway's low-latency execution-management technology with its own electronic trade-order-management solutions.

=== Canoe Intelligence ===
In July 2026, Bloomberg L.P. agreed to acquire Canoe Intelligence, a platform that automates the collection and organization of private-markets data for institutional investors, wealth managers, and family offices. Financial terms of the acquisition were not disclosed. Bloomberg said the acquisition would expand its capabilities in private-markets data and analytics.

== Products and services ==
=== Bloomberg Professional Services ===
In 2011, sales from the Bloomberg Professional Services, also known as the Bloomberg Terminal, accounted for more than 85 percent of Bloomberg L.P.'s annual revenue. The financial data vendor's proprietary computer system, starting at $24,000 per user per year, allows subscribers to access the Bloomberg Professional service to monitor and analyze real-time financial data, search financial news, obtain price quotes and send electronic messages through the Bloomberg Messaging Service. The Terminal covers both public and private markets globally.

=== Bloomberg News ===
Bloomberg News was co-founded by Michael Bloomberg and Matthew Winkler in 1990, to deliver financial news reporting to Bloomberg terminal subscribers. In 2000, Bloomberg News included more than 2,300 editors and reporters in 100 countries. Content produced by Bloomberg News is disseminated through the Bloomberg terminal, Bloomberg Television, Bloomberg Radio, Bloomberg Businessweek, Bloomberg Markets and Bloomberg.com. Since 2015, John Micklethwait has served as editor-in-chief.

=== Bloomberg Television ===
Bloomberg Television, a service of Bloomberg News, is a 24-hour financial news television network. It was introduced in 1994, as a subscription service transmitted on satellite television provider DirecTV, 13 hours a day, 7 days a week. The network has taken over the channel space of the defunct Financial News Network and hired most of the former FNN employees. Soon after, the network entered the cable television market and by 2000, Bloomberg's 24-hour news programming was available to 200 million households. Justin B. Smith is CEO of Bloomberg Multimedia Group which includes Bloomberg Radio, Bloomberg Television and online components of Bloomberg's multimedia offerings.

=== Bloomberg Markets ===
Bloomberg Markets is a monthly magazine launched in 1992, that provides in-depth coverage of global financial markets for finance professionals. In 2010, the magazine was redesigned in an effort to update its readership beyond Bloomberg terminal users. Michael Dukmejian has served as the magazine's publisher since 2009.

=== Bloomberg Pursuits ===
Bloomberg Pursuits was a bimonthly luxury magazine distributed to Bloomberg terminal users and to newsstands. It ceased publication in 2016. A digital edition and show on Bloomberg Television continue under the same name.

=== Bloomberg Entity Exchange ===
Bloomberg Entity Exchange is a web-based, centralised and secure platform for buy side firms, sell side firms, corporations and insurance firms, banks or brokers to fulfill Know Your Customer (KYC) compliance requirements. It was launched on May 25, 2016.

=== Bloomberg Government ===
Launched in 2011, Bloomberg Government is an online service that provides news and information about politics, along with legislative and regulatory coverage.

=== Bloomberg Law ===
In 2009, Bloomberg L.P. introduced Bloomberg Law, a subscription service for real-time legal research. A subscription to the service provides access to law dockets, legal filings, and reports from Bloomberg legal analysts as well as business news and information.

=== Bloomberg Opinion ===
Bloomberg Opinion, formerly Bloomberg View, is an editorial division of Bloomberg News which launched in May 2011. The site provides editorial content from columnists, authors and editors about news issues and is available for free on the company's website. David Shipley, former Op-Ed page editor at The New York Times, is Bloomberg Opinion's executive editor.

=== Bloomberg Tradebook ===
Bloomberg Tradebook is an electronic agency brokerage for equity, futures, options and foreign exchange trades. Its "buyside" services include access to trading algorithms, analytics and marketing insights, while its "sellside" services include connection to electronic trading networks and global trading capabilities. Bloomberg Tradebook was founded in 1996, as an affiliate of Bloomberg L.P.

=== Bloomberg Beta ===
Bloomberg Beta is a venture capital firm capitalized by Bloomberg L.P. Founded in 2013, the $75 million fund is focused on investments in areas broadly of interest to Bloomberg L.P., and invests purely for financial return. It is headquartered in San Francisco.

=== Bloomberg Innovation Index ===
The Bloomberg Innovation Index is an annual ranking of how innovative countries are. It is based on six criteria: research and development, manufacturing, high-tech companies, post-secondary education, research personnel, and patents. Bloomberg uses data from the World Bank, the International Monetary Fund, the World Intellectual Property Organization, the United States Patent and Trademark Office, the OECD and UNESCO to compile the ranking.

=== Open Bloomberg ===
Bloomberg has openly licensed its symbology system (Bloomberg Open Symbology, BSYM), and financial data API (Bloomberg Programming API, BLPAPI).

=== Bloomberg Live ===
Bloomberg Live is a series of conferences targeted towards business people.

=== Bloomberg Quicktake ===
Quicktake (formerly TicToc) is Bloomberg's social media brand. Originally launched on Twitter, it was expanded to other platforms including Facebook, Instagram, YouTube and is also available on Amazon's Alexa. It will also play at several screens across multiple airports in the United States and Canada. The platform is managed by a team of 70 people, consisting of editors, producers and social media specialists located across three bureaus in New York, London and Hong Kong. In December 2019, TicToc was renamed "QuickTake by Bloomberg" in order to avoid confusion with the social media platform TikTok. The camel case and the word "by" were later eliminated, and "Bloomberg" was moved in front of "Quicktake", although the two words do not always appear together.

=== Bloomberg New Economy Forum ===
Bloomberg New Economy Forum is an invitation-only event for business executives, government officials, and academics. The inaugural event was held in 2018 in Singapore. In 2019, the forum took place in Beijing, China. In 2020 the event was held virtually. Both the 2021 and 2022 events were held in Singapore.

The Bloomberg New Economy Forum Community includes leaders from the public and private sectors from around the world. Founding partners of the forum included 3M, ADNOC, Dangote, ExxonMobil, FedEx, HSBC, Hyundai, Mastercard, Microsoft, and Softbank.

In 2021, the company initiated the Bloomberg New Economy Catalysts program to spotlight the work of changemakers and its impact on the world.

=== Bloomberg Línea ===
Bloomberg Línea is a partnership launched in 2021 to serve Spanish, Portuguese and English speaking Latino audiences.

=== Bloomberg Intelligence ===
Bloomberg Intelligence (BI) is Bloomberg's research division. It provides data and analytics on global markets. It is available exclusively on the Bloomberg Terminal and the Bloomberg Professional App.

== Offices ==
=== Locations ===
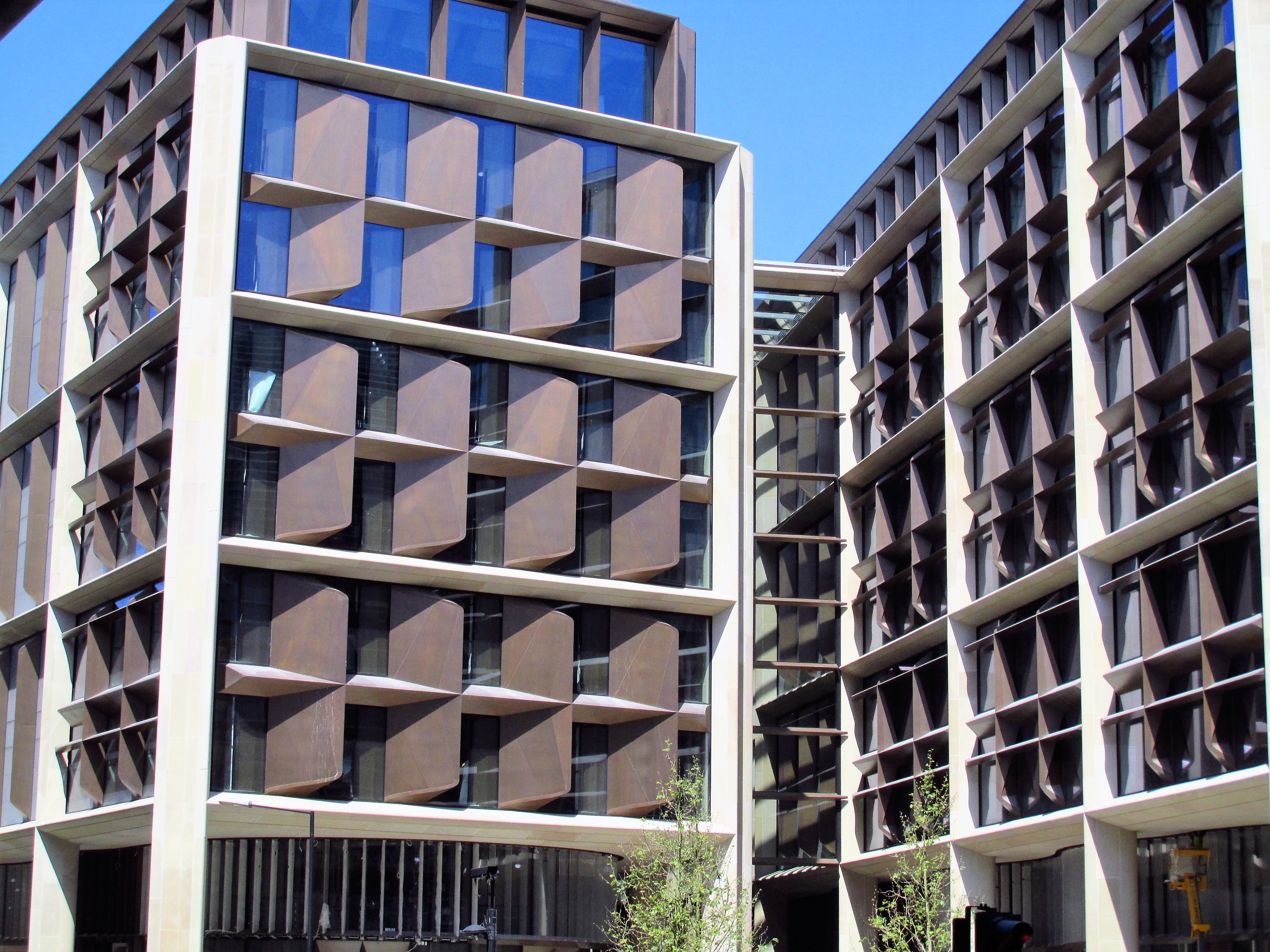
Bloomberg London building

Bloomberg L.P.'s headquarters is located in 731 Lexington Avenue (informally known as Bloomberg Tower) in Midtown Manhattan, New York City. As of 2011, Bloomberg L.P. occupied 900,000 square feet (84,000 m^{2}) of office space at the base of the tower. The company's New York offices also include 400,000 square feet (37,000 m^{2}) located at 120 Park Avenue and 924,876 square feet (85,924 m^{2}) located at 919 Third Avenue. It maintains offices in 167 locations around the world, including Bloomberg London, its European headquarters.

=== Corporate culture ===
The Bloomberg L.P. offices are non-hierarchical – even executives do not have private offices. All employees sit at identical white desks each topped with a custom-built Bloomberg computer terminal. The office space also includes rows of flat-panel monitors overhead that display news, market data, the weather and Bloomberg customer service statistics.

=== Leadership ===
Bloomberg L.P.'s Management Committee includes Michael Bloomberg, Peter Grauer, and Thomas Secunda.

== Controversies ==
=== Turner Construction and Bloomberg LP construction scandal ===
Between 2010 and 2017, a "pay-to-play" scheme went along between two Turner Construction executives, two Bloomberg executives; and vendors and subcontractors involving interior construction at the Bloomberg offices including its headquarters at 731 Lexington Ave. In July 2020, Bloomberg's construction manager Michael Campana was sentenced to two years in prison for tax evasion on $420,000 in connection with accepting bribery. The bribery was in the form of cash, work on personal property, Super Bowl tickets and payment for Campana's wedding.

On September 29, 2020, Anthony Guzzone, the Director of Global Construction at Bloomberg from 2010 and 2017, pleaded guilty to evading taxes on over $1.45 million he received in bribes from construction subcontractors in exchange for being awarded work performed for Bloomberg. Guzzone accepted more than $5.1 million in bribes. He was sentenced to prison for three years and two months in January 2021

=== Lawsuits ===
==== Olszewski v. Bloomberg L.P. ====
In 1996, former Bloomberg L.P. sales representative Mary Ann Olszewski sued the company, alleging that she was drugged and raped by her supervisor, Bryan Lewis, and claimed she was terminated shortly after reporting the incident in a May 25, 1995, meeting. The lawsuit also alleged the company internally investigated Olszewski, attempting to get coworkers to portray her as "flirtatious" or a "sex hound." Olszewski also claimed that male employees at the company engaged in the "sexual degradation of women" and that the company "took no steps to prevent or curtail the ongoing sexual harassment of female employees by Michael Bloomberg." Bloomberg, on behalf of Bloomberg L.P., testified that he was made aware of the rape allegation and offered to move Olszewski into another sales unit. Bloomberg also testified that he did not find Olszewski's allegation genuine because there was not "an unimpeachable third-party witness" present during the alleged event, elaborating that "there are times when three people are together."

The case was dismissed by a federal judge in 1999 after Olszewski's lawyer had ignored repeated deadlines to submit a response to a motion to end the case. The case was re-opened by another lawyer in 2000, but disappeared from the court docket in 2001.

==== Sekiko Sakai Garrison v. Michael Bloomberg and Bloomberg L.P. ====
In 1997, former Bloomberg L.P. sales executive Sekiko Sakai Garrison filed a lawsuit against the company and Michael Bloomberg, alleging sexual harassment and wrongful termination. Garrison alleged that when she told Bloomberg that she was pregnant, he told her to "Kill it!" and said "Great! Number 16," referring to the number of women in the company who were pregnant or on maternity leave at the time. According to the lawsuit, Garrison told a manager about the incident but was told to "forget it ever happened" before being fired.

Garrison also claimed that Bloomberg told female salespeople to "line up to give him [oral sex] as a wedding present," referring to a male employee who was getting married. The lawsuit also alleged that Bloomberg berated a female employee who had trouble finding a nanny, saying, "It's a f------ baby! All it does is eat and s---! It doesn't know the difference between you and anyone else! All you need is some black who doesn't even have to speak English to rescue it from a burning building!"

The company did not admit any wrongdoing, but settled the lawsuit out of court in 2000.

==== EEOC v. Bloomberg L.P. ====
In September 2007, the Equal Employment Opportunity Commission (EEOC) filed a class-action lawsuit against Bloomberg L.P. on behalf of more than 80 female employees who argued that Bloomberg L.P. engaged in discrimination against women who took maternity leave. In August 2011, Judge Loretta A. Preska of the federal United States District Court for the Southern District of New York in Manhattan dismissed the charges, writing that the Equal Employment Opportunity Commission did not present sufficient evidence to support its claim.

In September 2013, Preska dismissed an EEOC lawsuit on behalf of 29 pregnant employees of Bloomberg L.P. In addition, she dismissed pregnancy bias claims from five individual plaintiffs, and allowed part of the case from a sixth plaintiff to proceed.

==== Bloomberg L.P. v. Board of Governors of the Federal Reserve ====
Bloomberg L.P. brought a lawsuit against the Board of Governors of the Federal Reserve System (Bloomberg L.P. v. Board of Governors of the Federal Reserve System) to force the Fed to share details about its lending programs during the U.S. Government bailout in 2008. The records documented Federal Reserve loans issued to financial firms and revealed the identities of the firms, the amounts borrowed and the collateral posted in return. Bloomberg L.P. won at the trial court level. The Second Circuit Court ruled in favor of Bloomberg L.P. in March 2010, but the case was appealed to the Supreme Court by a group of large U.S. commercial banks in October. In March 2011, the Supreme Court let stand the Second Circuit Court ruling mandating the release of Fed bailout details.

==== Bloomberg L.P. v. Bloomberg Ltd ====
On October 22, 2008, Bloomberg L.P. applied for a change of name of Bloomberg Ltd, under s. 69(1)(b) of the Companies Act 2006. Bloomberg L.P. then amended its name to Bloomberg Finance Three L.P. Bloomberg Ltd was ordered at the Company Names Tribunal on May 11, 2009, to change its name so as to not have a name that would likely interfere, by similarity, with the goodwill of Bloomberg Finance Three L.P. as well as to pay costs.

==== Nafeesa Syeed v. Bloomberg L.P. ====
According to a recent case in August 2020, Bloomberg L.P. is again being charged with discrimination against non-white workers. Nafeesa Syeed, who served at Bloomberg for around four years as a national security reporter and Middle East reporter, sued the corporation in New York city court for sexism based on her gender and her ethnicity as a South Asian-American. Bloomberg faces a related complaint by a former saleswoman, who filed under a pseudonym in June and the corporation is now seeking to compel a public release of her name. Throughout both cases the same law firm represented the plaintiffs.

=== Fossil fuel advertising ===
An investigation by the Intercept, the Nation, and DeSmog found that Bloomberg L.P. is one of the leading media outlets that publishes advertising for the fossil fuel industry. Journalists who cover climate change for Bloomberg News are concerned that conflicts of interest with the companies and industries that caused climate change and obstructed action will reduce the credibility of their reporting on climate change and cause readers to downplay the climate crisis.

=== 2024 Russian prisoner exchange ===
While the 2024 Russian prisoner exchange was still in progress, Bloomberg News broke a news embargo by reporting information provided by the White House. Other publications, including the Wall Street Journal, criticized Bloomberg for breaking the embargo, potentially jeopardizing the exchange, and for a Bloomberg editor's apparent boasting for being the one to first publish a breaking news story.

== See also ==
- Bloomberg Markets
- Bloomberg Terminal
- Financial data vendor
