= Mount Vernon News =

Newspaper in Mount Vernon, Ohio

- Type: Saturday newspaper
- Format: Broadsheet
- Owner(s): Metric Media LLC
- Publisher: Kyle Barnett
- Managing editor: Fred Main
- Founded: 1939
- Headquarters: 107 South Main Street, Suite 200 Mount Vernon, Ohio 43050
- Circulation: 5,500
- ISSN: 0747-2099
- OCLC number: 11185341
- Website: mountvernonnews.com

The Mount Vernon News is a print newspaper published once a week in Mount Vernon, Ohio. Since 2020, it is owned by Metric Media LLC, a company reported to engage pay-to-play coverage. Most of the content published by the newspaper since the Metric Media takeover has been press releases and submitted content.

The newspaper was originally formed in 1939 through the merger of the Daily Banner and the Republican News. The Culbertson family of Mount Vernon owned and managed the News for eight decades, and Kay Culbertson served as the newspaper's publisher for 28 years from 1992 to 2020.

== Metric Media ==
In August 2020, Metric Media LLC, a newspaper and media company that publishes 1,227 regional and business news sites across the U.S., purchased Mount Vernon News for at least $1 million. The new owners instructed staff that they would no longer receive employee benefits and would instead be considered contractors; this led half of the staff to quit on the spot.

Kyle Barnett, the new publisher, reported in an online "Dear Subscriber" letter two days after the purchase that the Mount Vernon News would immediately transition from its six-day-a-week publication schedule (no Sunday edition) to a two-day-a-week schedule (Wednesday and Saturday). The letter informed readers that "We promise to deliver more local news in 2 days than what you received before in 6 days."

Five months later (in December 2020), Metric Media sold the building on East Vine Street that had been home to the Mount Vernon News for 80 years. Since then, the News has operated out of offices in the Woodward Building on South Main Street.

In 2023 and 2024, the newspaper published an inordinate amount of stories that criticized Frazier Solar, a planned solar farm in Knox County. Within a year, 17 of the 40 print editions of the newspaper featured anti-solar power content on its front page. ProPublica linked the newspaper's anti-solar coverage to a well-financed campaign by fossil fuel interests seeking to scuttle solar energy.

Residents in the community criticized the newspaper for failing to publish obituaries in a timely manner.

As of 2024, the paper was published once a week and employed no local reporters or photographers.
