= Aristotle Capital Management =

American investment firm

Aristotle Capital Management LLC
- Company type: Private
- Industry: Investment management
- Predecessor: Metropolitan West Capital Management
- Founded: October 2010; 15 years ago
- Founders: Howard Gleicher; Steve Borowski
- Headquarters: Westwood Gateway, Los Angeles, California, US
- Key people: Howard Gleicher (CEO and CIO); Richard Hollander (chairman)
- AUM: US$93 billion (September 2024)
- Number of employees: 164 (2024)
- Website: aristotlecap.com

Aristotle Capital Management is an American investment management firm headquartered in Los Angeles, California. The firm has both equity and fixed income strategies.

== Background ==
The origins of Aristotle can be traced back to its predecessor, Metropolitan West Capital Management (MWCM), a large-cap equity value investing business under Metropolitan West Financial. It was founded by Howard Gleicher, Gary Lisenbee and Steve Borowski in 1997. The three of them were previously principals at Palley-Needelman Asset Management.

In June 2006, MWCM sold a majority controlling interest to Evergreen Investments, whose parent was Wachovia, but its founders continued to work at the firm in senior management.

In January 2009, Wachovia was acquired by Wells Fargo, resulting in Evergreen Investments becoming part of Wells Fargo Asset Management. The concerns over the acquisitions led to Gleicher and Borowski leaving in 2010 to found Aristotle. Both said that the non-compete agreements they signed when the business was sold to Evergreen Investments had expired, so the timing was right. Lisenbee, however, remained with MWCM because he felt a fiduciary responsibility, and his non-compete agreement lasted for seven years.

In July 2011, Aristotle acquired a majority stake in money manager Reed, Conner & Birdwell which accounted for $1.6 billion of Aristotle's $5 billion assets under management (AUM).

In September 2013, Lisenbee rejoined his colleagues at Aristotle after his non-compete agreement expired. He stated that since Aristotle was smaller, it allowed more nimble investing. This was no longer possible at MWCM due to investment decisions requiring approval from above. 80% of Aristotle's assets were from institutional investors, and it was believed Lisenbee could handle the sales duties while Gleicher handled the investment ones. Since the beginning of 2013, eight other MWCM staff have joined Aristotle.

From 2014 to 2016, Aristotle acquired three teams to expand its product offering range. In January 2014, Aristotle acquired West Gate Horizons to form Aristotle Credit Partners that specialized in credit products. In January 2015, Aristotle acquired the small and mid-cap strategies group of Eagle Boston Investment Management to form Aristotle Capital Boston. In December 2016, Aristotle Atlantic Partners was launched, with its team being from the U.S. equity group of Deutsche Asset Management.

In October 2022, Aristotle acquired Pacific Life's credit asset management arm, Pacific Asset Management. When the deal was completed in 2023, it was renamed to Aristotle Pacific and increased Aristotle's AUM by 50%. Aristotle, which was previously mostly equity-focused, had now become a multi-asset manager.

== See also ==
- Metropolitan West Financial
