= Guy E. Baker =

American business executive

- Born: Guy Eugene Baker
- Education: Claremont McKenna College (B.S. in Economics); University of Southern California (MBA); American College in Bryn Mawr, Pennsylvania (MSFS), (MSM), (PhD)
- Occupations: business executive; wealth manager
- Title: President, Founder of Associates in Insurance Concept Services, Inc. dba BTA Advisory Group; President, Founder of BTA Advisory Group; President, Founder of Wealth Team Alliance
- Spouse: Colleen Baker (m. 1967)
- Children: 4

Guy Eugene Baker is an American business executive, speaker and author, and is known as in financial services, as a life insurance, and wealth management expert. Baker served as Pacific Life's USC campus manager and then as a chair of the company's Agent Advisory Board for ten years.

In 2021, Forbes Magazine selected Baker on its national list of Top 250 Financial Security Professionals. In 2023, he ranked number 30 on Forbes Magazine's Top Financial Security Professionals Best-in-State California.

== Education ==
In 1967, Baker earned his B.S. in Economics from Claremont McKenna College and in 1968, he earned an MBA in Finance from the University of Southern California. From the American College in Bryn Mawr, Pennsylvania he earned a Master of Science in Financial Services (MSFS), a Master of Science in Management (MSM), class 1984, 1985, and a PhD in Financial and Retirement Planning in 2018.

== Career ==
Baker joined Pacific Life's Los Angeles office as an agent while studying at McKenna College, following his graduation from McKenna College he served as the manager of Pacific Life's USC campus office for two years. Upon graduation, he joined the Orange County office of Pacific Life. He earned recognition as chair of the company's Agent Advisory Board for ten consecutive years beginning in 1989. In 1986, Baker formed BTA Advisory Group, an insurance broker with its headquarters in Irvine, California.

Baker was one of the first Million Dollar Round Table (MDRT) speakers to introduce asset management to the members in the 2000s, where he served on numerous task forces and committees. In 1995, he was appointed Top of the Table program chairman and served on the MDRT Program development committee three times. In 1996, with Stan Mountford, he co-founded BMI Consulting to address strategies for closely held businesses.

In 2010, he served as the 84th president of the (MDRT). Baker has qualified for the MDRT 53 times, beginning in 1970, and as a member of the Top of the Table 45 times.

In 2012, he founded Wealth Teams Alliance, a registered investment adviser based in Irvine, California.

In 2021, Forbes Magazine selected Baker for its national list of Top 250 Financial Security Professionals, ranking him at number 193 with a career total death benefits placed on clients valued at more than $2 billion. In 2023, he ranked number 30 on Forbes Magazine's Top Financial Security Professionals Best-in-State California. Worth Magazine selected Baker for its Top 250 Wealth Advisors in 2008 and was published in the Orange Coast Magazine for his tenth select in 2022 as a Five Star Wealth Manager.

Baker was on the faculty of Personal Financial Planning designation taught at the University of California, Irvine.

== Selected publications ==
Baker is a writer of numerous trade articles, and has authored ten self-published books on subjects such as sales psychology, stock market management, financial success principles and succession strategies. Some of Baker's books are:

- Baker, Guy (2000). Why People Buy. New York: Oxford University Press, USA. ISBN 978-0-19-504086-9.
- Baker, Guy E.; Harris, Ken (1994-04-01). Baker's Dozen. Standel Pub. ISBN 978-0-9647721-1-3.
- Baker, Guy E.; Baker, Guy E.; Jensen, Rick (March 1998). Investment Alchemy. Standel. ISBN 978-0-9647721-3-7.
- Baker, Guy E. (2013). The Great Wealth Erosion. PSM Resource LLP. ISBN 978-981-07-8004-3.
- Baker, Guy E. (2006). Market Tune-Up Proven Methods To Increase Your Sales Productivity. Standel Publishing. ISBN 978-0-9647721-7-5.

== Honors and recognitions ==
Baker has received several honors including:

- 1993, Preston Hotchkis “Distinguished Achievement Award,” Pacific Life Insurance Company.
- 2019, The John Newton Russell Award (for life achievement), National Association of Insurance and Financial Advisors.

== Personal life ==
Baker has been married to Colleen since 1967 and lives in San Juan Capistrano, California. Married since college, they have four adult children, grandparents to eleven grandchildren, and great-grandparents to 12 great-grandchildren.
