= Wachovia Bank, N.A. v. Schmidt =

- Supreme Court of the United States

Decided January 17, 2006
- Full case name: Wachovia Bank, N.A. v. Schmidt
- Citations: 546 U.S. 303 (more)

Holding
- A national bank, for 28 U.S.C. §1348 purposes, is a citizen of the state in which its main office, as set forth in its articles of association, is located.

Court membership
- Chief Justice John Roberts Associate Justices John P. Stevens · Sandra Day O'Connor; Antonin Scalia · Anthony Kennedy; David Souter · Clarence Thomas; Ruth Bader Ginsburg · Stephen Breyer

Case opinion
- Majority: Ginsburg, joined by unanimous
- Thomas took no part in the consideration or decision of the case.

Wachovia Bank, N.A. v. Schmidt, 546 U.S. 303 (2006), was a United States Supreme Court case in which the court held that a national bank, for 28 U.S.C. §1348 purposes, is a citizen of the state in which its main office, as set forth in its articles of association, is located.

== Background ==
Wachovia Bank, National Association (Wachovia), was a national banking association with its designated main office in North Carolina and branch offices in many states, including South Carolina. Schmidt and other South Carolina citizens sued Wachovia in a South Carolina state court for fraudulently inducing them to participate in an illegitimate tax shelter. Shortly thereafter, Wachovia filed a petition in federal District Court, seeking to compel arbitration of the dispute. As the sole basis for federal-court jurisdiction, Wachovia alleged the parties' diverse citizenship. The District Court denied Wachovia's petition on the merits. On appeal, the Fourth Circuit Court of Appeals determined that the District Court lacked subject-matter jurisdiction over the action, vacated the judgment, and instructed the District Court to dismiss the case. The appeals court observed that Wachovia's citizenship for diversity purposes is controlled by §1348, which provides that "national banking associations" are "deemed citizens of the States in which they are respectively located." As the court read §1348, Wachovia was "located" in, and is therefore a "citizen" of, every state in which it maintains a branch office. Thus, Wachovia's South Carolina branch operations rendered it a citizen of that state. Given the South Carolina citizenship of the opposing parties, the court concluded that the matter could not be adjudicated in federal court.

The Supreme Court granted certiorari.

== Opinion of the court ==
The Supreme Court issued an opinion on January 17, 2006.

== Later developments ==
Wachovia Bank went defunct in 2008.

== See also ==
- Watters v. Wachovia Bank, N.A.
- Hertz Corp. v. Friend
