= Robert K. Steel =

American businessman (born 1951)

Bob Steel
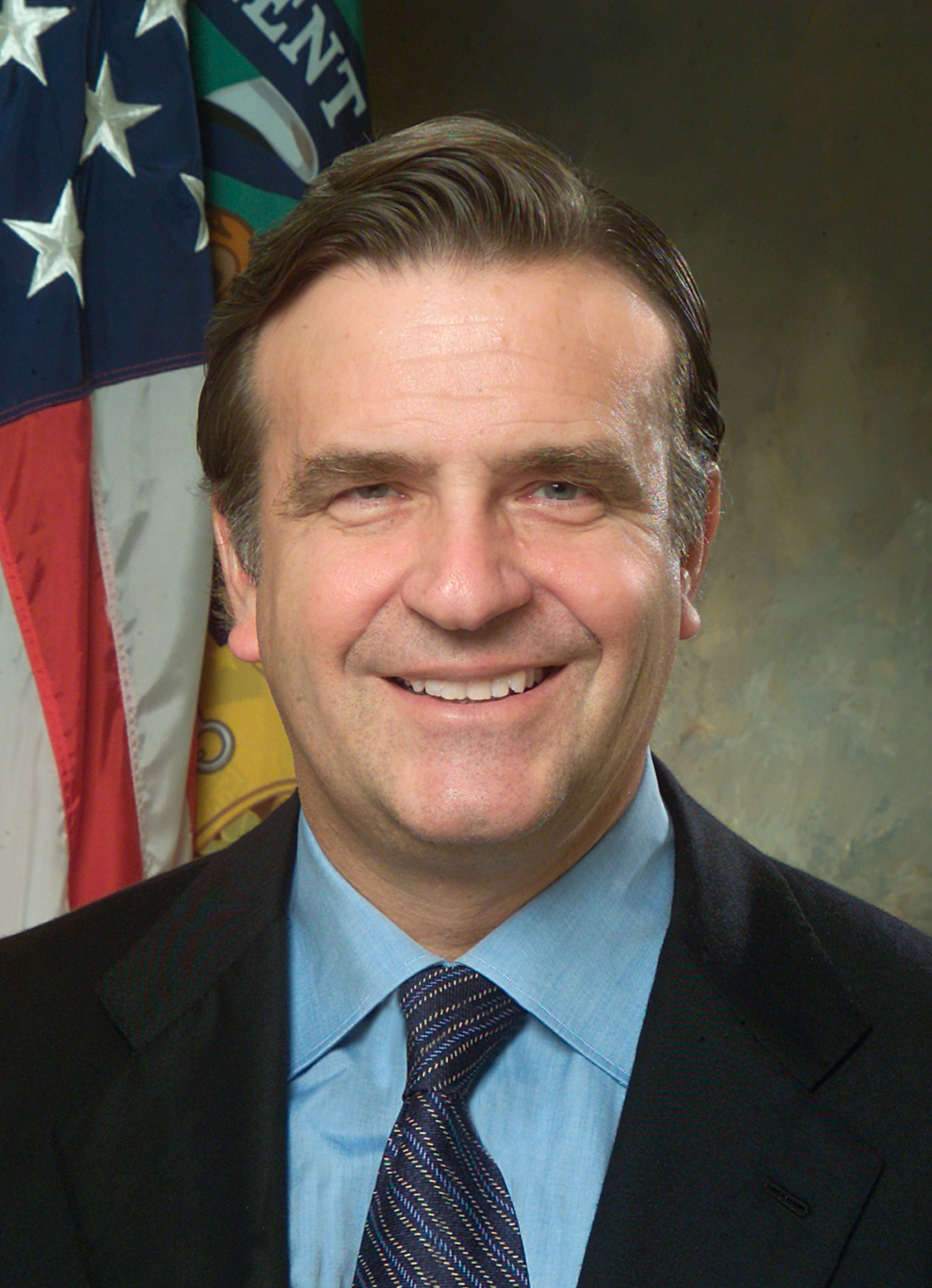

Deputy Mayor of New York City for Economic Development and Rebuilding
- In office June 2010 – January 2014
- Mayor: Michael Bloomberg
- Preceded by: Robert Lieber
- Succeeded by: Alicia Glen

16th Under Secretary of the Treasury for Domestic Finance
- In office October 10, 2006 – July 9, 2008
- President: George W. Bush
- Preceded by: Randal Quarles
- Succeeded by: Anthony Ryan

Personal details
- Born: August 3, 1951 (age 75) Durham, North Carolina, U.S.
- Party: Republican
- Spouse: Gillian Steel
- Children: 3 daughters
- Education: Duke University (BA); University of Chicago (MBA)

Robert King Steel (born August 3, 1951) is an American businessman, financier and government official who has served as Deputy Mayor for Economic Development and Rebuilding in the administration of New York City Mayor Michael Bloomberg, Under Secretary for Domestic Finance of the United States Treasury, chief executive officer of Wachovia Corporation and vice chairman of Goldman Sachs. He has also served as chairman of the board of trustees at Duke University and the Aspen Institute. In May 2014, he was tapped to succeed Joseph R. Perella as chief executive officer of Perella Weinberg Partners, a private investment banking and asset management firm.

== Personal life ==
The second of three boys, Steel grew up in Durham, North Carolina, attending public schools near Duke University, his future college. He was a Boy Scout and attained the rank of Eagle Scout. His late father, Charles Steel, III, was a life insurance agent and his mother, Elizabeth, was a homemaker.

He received his undergraduate degree from Duke in 1973, majoring in history and political science. He received his Master of Business Administration degree from the University of Chicago in 1984.

Steel lives in New York, NY; he is married to Gillian Steel and they have three daughters. He enjoys hiking, skiing and golfing.

== Business career ==
=== Goldman Sachs, 1976–2004 ===
Steel spent nearly 30 years at Goldman Sachs, rising to vice chair of the firm. He joined the Chicago office in 1976 and served as that office's co-head of institutional sales. In 1987, he transferred to London, where he founded the Equity Capital Markets Group for Europe. At the time, Europe was privatizing major state-owned enterprises, like telecom, utility and energy interests, to transition to more market-driven economies. Steel was extensively involved in the privatization and capital-raising efforts for European corporations and governments. In 1988, he became partner in the firm. He later became head of Goldman Sachs Equities for Europe. In 1994, he relocated to New York and served as co-head of the Goldman Sachs Equities Division from 1996 to 2002 until his appointment as a vice chair of the firm. Upon his retirement from Goldman Sachs on February 1, 2004, he became advisory director and then senior director in December 2004.

=== Barclays Bank, 2005–06 ===
From June 1, 2005, to October 11, 2006, Steel served on the board of directors of Barclays Plc. In 2005 he helped settle a conflict between Barclays' commercial and investment divisions over who would serve a newly purchased South African bank. Treasury Secretary Henry Paulson later said of Steel: "He's very good at smoothing over conflicts; and when there's tensions, bringing the temperature down."

=== Wachovia/Wells Fargo, 2008–2010 ===
On July 9, 2008, Steel was named president and CEO of Wachovia. Although Steel's predecessor, G. Kennedy Thompson had been criticized for exposing the firm to high-risk mortgages, Steel hoped to put the company on firm footing until it failed in the Fall 2008 crisis. He bought one million shares of Wachovia stock on the open market and bought a house in Charlotte. He also turned down a bonus he was due to receive.

Steel was adamant that Wachovia would stay independent. However, by September 2008, market conditions had deteriorated severely. On September 26, Wachovia lost almost one percent of its deposits, leading regulators to force Wachovia to put itself up for sale. After an initial deal with Citigroup for $1/share, Steel and the Wachovia board accepted an offer to merge with Wells Fargo for $7/share. (Wells Fargo would be purchasing 100% of Wachovia; the Citi deal would have resulted in Wachovia shedding its commercial banking arm while retaining Wachovia Securities and Evergreen Investments. This merger was more than the 100th merger in Wachovia's history. The arrangement made Wells Fargo the second-largest retail brokerage in the United States.

In January 2009, The Wall Street Journal reported that the Securities and Exchange Commission was investigating claims Steel made about the future of the bank before it started talks about a potential merger.

Following the merger, Steel was invited to join the board of Wells Fargo and served on the firm's credit and finance committees. In 2010, upon being appointed Deputy Mayor for Economic Development of New York City, Steel resigned his seat on the Wells Fargo board.

=== Perella Weinberg Partners, 2014-present ===
On July 7, 2014, Steel was named CEO of Perella Weinberg Partners. Perella Weinberg is an independent, privately owned, global financial services firm providing corporate advisory and asset management services to clients around the world. Founded in 2006, the firm has since grown to more than 400 employees, and has worked on transactions like NYSE Euronext's sale to IntercontinentalExchange and J. Crew's leveraged buyout by TPG. Its asset management arm oversees $11.5 billion in capital.

== Government service ==
=== Mayor's Office, New York City ===
On June 22, 2010, Steel was appointed by New York City Mayor Michael Bloomberg to serve as Deputy Mayor for Economic Development. Steel served as New York City Deputy Mayor for Economic Development from August 2010 to December 2013, ending his service at the conclusion of Mayor Michael Bloomberg's third term in office.

As Deputy Mayor, Steel was responsible for overseeing more than 10 mayoral agencies with collective annual operating budgets of $5B and more than 20,000 employees, including the New York City Economic Development Corporation; the New York City Housing Authority; NYC & Company; the New York City Taxi and Limousine Commission; and the city's Departments of City Planning, Transportation, Finance, Housing Preservation and Development, and Small Business Services. As Deputy Mayor, he served as Chairman of Brooklyn Bridge Park and Vice Chairman of Hudson River Park.

During Steel's tenure as Deputy Mayor, New York City's economy significantly outperformed the national economy, recovering more than 300% of the jobs it lost from the beginning of the recession compared to the country as a whole. Mayor Bloomberg and Deputy Mayor Steel left office with New York City enjoying record levels of total jobs (4m), private sector jobs (3.5m), tourist visitors (54.3m), and total population (8.4m).

Steel oversaw a number of critical projects, most notably the Applied Sciences initiative that will result in four new engineering and applied sciences campuses throughout New York built by Cornell Tech, New York University, Columbia University, and Carnegie Mellon. Together, these institutions will double the number of engineering faculty and graduate students in New York City over the next decade. Steel worked with the New York City Department of Education and the private sector to open the Academy for Software Engineering, a first of its kind public high school focused on the skills most in demand in the information and innovation economy, and to expand technology and coding curriculum throughout New York City's public middle schools and high schools.

Steel's term also saw the advancement of a range of large-scale development projects in all five boroughs, including the redevelopment of the Kingsbridge Armory in the Bronx into the world's largest ice center; the proposed development of the Staten Island Wheel on Staten Island; the redevelopment of Willets Point and Hallets Point in Queens; the expansion of the Downtown Brooklyn Cultural District; and the completion of the long-stalled Seward Park Urban Renewal Area on the Lower East Side of Manhattan. Steel also led Mayor Bloomberg's comprehensive redevelopment of the city's 520 miles of waterfront as well as the city's major development projects on the east side of the East River in Brooklyn (including the redevelopment of the Domino Sugar Factory, Brooklyn Bridge Park, the Watchtower complex, Greenpoint, Hunters Point South and Hallets Point in Queens), the Far West Side of Manhattan and Lower Manhattan at the World Trade Center site, where he mediated negotiations to restart construction of the National September 11 Memorial & Museum in 2012.

Steel also oversaw a significant expansion of transportation in New York City, including Citi Bike, boro taxis, the East River Ferry, five Select Bus Service bus rapid transit lines, and the 7 Subway Extension that extended the New York City Subway to 34th Street–Hudson Yards station.

Steel led several major initiatives to improve the governance and operations of the New York City Housing Authority, the largest Public Housing Authority in the country. In particular, Steel successfully pushed for state legislation to restructure NYCHA's board of directors and to advance a controversial plan to develop underutilized NYCHA land to generate proceeds needed to fund critical housing repairs.

=== U.S. Treasury, 2006–08 ===
Steel was appointed Under Secretary for Domestic Finance at the United States Department of the Treasury on October 10, 2006, and served until July 9, 2008. He was the principal adviser to the secretary on matters of domestic finance and led the department's activities regarding the U.S. financial system, fiscal policy and operations, governmental assets and liabilities, and related economic matters.

In March 2007, Steel testified before the U.S. House Financial Services Committee on reform of the housing Government Sponsored Enterprises (GSEs), including Fannie Mae and Freddie Mac. He said that the regulatory system for these institutions "neither has the tools, nor the stature, to deal effectively with the current size, complexity, and importance of these enterprises." He also testified that if GSEs are able to accomplish their mission, the risks must be managed and supervised. "Otherwise there may be a threat to their solvency, and importantly to the stability of other financial institutions and the strength of our economy," he said. Steel also oversaw the creation of the Blueprint on Financial Services Regulation as part of an initiative to increase America's capital market competitiveness.

As economic conditions worsened in 2007 and 2008, Steel helped design the federal government's response. In April 2008, Steel testified before the U.S. Senate Banking Committee regarding the rescue of Bear Stearns. Steel explained that although the Treasury had believed that the rescue of Bear Stearns was necessary, it had encouraged a low sale price so as not to encourage risky behavior by other large institutions.

== Academic and non-profit work ==
=== Kennedy School, 2004–06 ===
From February 2004 to September 2006, Steel was a senior fellow at the John F. Kennedy School of Government at Harvard University. He co-taught "Current Issues in U.S. Financial Markets Regulation." He received an award from the university president for excellence in teaching. He also co-authored an op-ed in The Washington Post entitled "For Retirees, A Day of Reckoning."

=== SeaChange Capital Partners, 2004–06 ===
In 2004, Steel and another former partner at Goldman Sachs, Charles T. Harris III, founded SeaChange Capital Partners, a nonprofit organization that arranges transformational funding for nonprofit organizations. It collaborates with wealthy individuals and family foundations and pools together their funds to provide significant unrestricted, multi-year support for these organizations. In so doing, SeaChange is employing many private sector strategies in raising capital for nonprofit organizations. In February 2010, Business Week profiled SeaChange in a "Second Acts" column.

=== Aspen Institute, 2006, 2008–present ===
In 2006, Steel was named chairman of the board of the Aspen Institute, a non-profit organization that promotes values-based leadership and provides neutral venues for discussing and acting on critical issues. He first assumed the position in 2006, but took a leave of absence during his service as Under Secretary of the Treasury. He returned to the role in 2008, succeeding William E. Mayer. In this role, Steel oversees development of the Aspen Global Leaders Network, which provides leadership training to leaders under 40.

=== Duke University, 1996–2009 ===
Steel served on the Duke University Board of Trustees from 1996 to 2009. He became vice chairman in 2000, and on July 1, 2005, he succeeded Peter M. Nicholas as the first Durham native to chair the board since its founding as a university in 1924. He left when his term ended in 2009. Prior to becoming chair of the board, Steel chaired the Duke University Management Company, the university's investment arm.

During Steel's term as chair, the board completed a $300 million financial aid initiative, saw record freshman applications, and completed several buildings on campus including the Nasher Museum of Art. Also during Steel's term, the Duke campus experienced the false-rape charge known as the 2006 Duke University lacrosse case. Steel was criticized for not supporting the falsely-accused students and insisting that the legal proceedings take their course. When the charges were dismissed and the players were declared innocent, Steel for the first time said the players "deserve our respect for the honorable way they have conducted themselves during this long legal ordeal .... Much as we wish that these three young men...could have been spared the agony of the past year, we believe that it was essential for the university to defer to the criminal justice system." In a suit by the lacrosse players, Steel is alleged to have helped suppress evidence of innocence to protect Duke's image, ordering Duke police to falsify their records to make the players appear more guilty, and explaining, "Sometimes individuals have to suffer for the good of the organization".

=== The After-School Corporation, 2004–06, 2008–2010 ===
In March 2004, Steel succeeded Herbert Sturz as the second chairman of The After-School Corporation (TASC), a non-profit organization devoted to "giving all kids opportunities to grow through after-school and summer activities that support, educate and inspire them." Upon confirmation as Under Secretary of the Treasury, Steel resigned as chairman and was succeeded by Robert D. Joffe. Steel rejoined the TASC board in 2008, but with his appointment as Deputy Mayor, stepped down again.

=== Hospital for Special Surgery, 2009–present ===
In September 2009, Steel was named to the board of trustees of the Hospital for Special Surgery. The Hospital for Special Surgery is the oldest orthopedic hospital in the United States and is considered the top hospital in the nation for joint replacement.

=== American Action Network, 2010–present ===
In 2010, Steel became a founding member of the advisory board of the American Action Network, a group devoted to developing and marketing conservative ideas. The group was described by the New York Times as a "center-right version of the Center for American Progress."

== Other activities ==
Steel has been a frequent panelist and commentator on America's financial situation and markets. In May 2009 he shared a panel with Felix Rohatyn and Daniel Gross, Senior Editor of Newsweek, on "Bringing the Economy Back to Life." Lesley Stahl moderated.

He is also a member of the Pew Charitable Trusts Task Force on Financial Reform, which advises the United States Congress on critical financial reform issues. In December 2009, he testified before the Joint Economic Committee of the U.S. House and Senate regarding financial reform. He is also a member of The FDIC Advisory Committee on Economic Inclusion (ComE-IN), which focuses on how to improve underserved and low- and moderate-income consumers' access to the financial mainstream.

Although Steel was appointed to his Treasury post by a Republican president, he does not regard himself as an ideologue, and has been occasionally criticized for his political independence. For example, although Steel hosted fundraisers at his home for John McCain, columnist Bob Novak complained that Steel is "no Republican," citing that he had worked with Clinton Treasury Secretary Robert Rubin at Goldman Sachs and made campaign donations in 2002 to Democrats from his home state of North Carolina.

In 2013, Steel was a signatory to an amicus curiae brief submitted to the Supreme Court in support of same-sex marriage during the Hollingsworth v. Perry case.

=== Film Production ===
In February 2010, the New York Times reported that "Blood Done Sign My Name," a film about race relations in North Carolina in 1970, was conceived when Steel read Timothy B. Tyson's book of that name and saw "cinematic potential" in the story about his home state. Steel brought Tyson together with screenwriter and fellow Greenwich-resident Jeb Stuart, who wrote and directed the film. Steel is listed as an executive producer.

Government offices
Preceded by Randal K. Quarles	Under Secretary for Domestic Finance; 2006 – 2008	Succeeded by Anthony Ryan (Acting); Michael Barr (Acting); Jeffrey A. Goldstein
