= G. Kennedy Thompson =

American banker (born 1950)

- Born: November 25, 1950 (age 75); Clarksville, Virginia, US
- Other name: Ken Thompson
- Education: University of North Carolina at Chapel Hill; Wake Forest University
- Occupations: banker, businessman
- Employer(s): Wachovia; First Union
- Term: 1976 - 2008

G. Kennedy Thompson, also known as Ken Thompson, (born November 25, 1950) is an American banker and businessman who was chairman, president, and CEO of Wachovia Corporation, formerly First Union Corporation, from 2000 through 2008. During his leadership, Wachovia grew to become the nation's fourth largest bank.

== Early life ==
Thompson was born in Clarksville, Virginia and was raised in Rocky Mount, North Carolina. He was the son of Stacy Kennedy and Maynard Thompson, the manager of a textile factory.

He attended the University of North Carolina at Chapel Hill, where he was a Morehead Scholar and a member of Beta Theta Pi fraternity. He graduated with B.A. in American Studies in 1973. He also received an MBA from Wake Forest University in 1975.

== Career ==
Starting in 1976, Thompson had a variety of positions at First Union, including manager of the New York loans office, senior vice president of human resources, vice president of Global Capital Markets, president of First Union-Florida, and president of First Union Georgia. In 2000, he became chairman, president, and CEO, replacing Edward E. Crutchfield who stepped down for health reasons.

In September 2001, Thompson brokered the merger of First Union and Wachovia in September 2001. First Union changed its name to Wachovia after fending off a hostile takeover attempt by SunTrust Bank. He overhauled the ailing bank. In 2003, BusinessWeek named Thompson the Business Person of the Year. In 2006, under Thompson's leadership, Wachovia acquired Golden West Financial Corp. for approximately $26 billion, at the peak of the real estate market. In 2007, Thompson received a total compensation of $15,653,559, which included a base salary of $1,090,000, a cash bonus of $0, stocks granted of $12,351,369, and options granted of $1,925,933.

However, Golden West mostly lent risky subprime loans. Thompson was pushed out of Wachovia on June 2, 2008, becoming one of many financial services executives who were ousted amid turmoil in the U.S. housing market. Thompson did not receive incentive pay for the 2008 fiscal year, but according to a filing with the Securities and Exchange Commission, he received a severance of $1.45 million and accelerated vesting of $7.25 million in restricted stock. Thompson had served the company for 32 years.

Lanty Smith replaced Thompson as interim CEO of Wachovia. On July 10, 2008 Robert K. Steel, the former Treasury Undersecretary and Goldman Sachs Group Inc. executive, took over as CEO of Wachovia. However, Wachovia only survived for two more months before it was forced to merge with Wells Fargo.

In 2009, Thompson became a principal of Aquiline Capital Partners, a New York Equity firm.

In 2010, Wachovia settled out of court a case in which it allegedly laundered over $378 billion in cash and traveler's checks from Mexican drug cartels between 2004 and 2006, during Thompson's tenure as CEO. Terms of the settlement included a $110 million forfeiture and a $50 million fine.

== Professional affiliations ==
Thompson previously served as president of the Federal Reserve Board's Federal Advisory Committee. He was chairman of The Clearing House, the Financial Services Roundtable, the Financial Services Forum, and the International Monetary Committee. He also served on the board of Florida Rock Industries, Insteel Industries Inc., LendingTree, and Pinnacle Financial Partners.

In 2011, he joined the board of BNC Bancorp, the holding company of the Bank of North Carolina. He also served on the Hewlett-Packard (HP) board starting in 2006; in April 2013, he stepped down following his very narrow re-election with 55% of the shareholder vote.

== Personal life ==
Thompson and his wife Kathylee have three children: Kenny, Scott, and Stacey.

Thompson was a board member of Advantage Carolina, the Carolinas Healthcare System, Charlotte Institute for Technology Innovation, the Charlotte Latin School, the North Carolina Blumenthal Performing Arts Center, the PGA Tour, Teach For America, Wake Forest University, and the YMCA Metropolitan board. He is also a trustee for the Morehead-Cain Foundation. He was a board member and chairman of the United Way of Central Carolinas, Inc.
