= Watters v. Wachovia Bank, N.A. =

- Supreme Court of the United States

Decided April 17, 2007
- Full case name: Watters v. Wachovia Bank, N.A.
- Citations: 550 U.S. 1 (more)

Holding
- The mortgage business of a nationally-chartered bank, whether conducted by the bank itself or through the bank's operating subsidiary, is subject to OCC's superintendence, and not to the licensing, reporting, and visitorial regimes of the several States in which the subsidiary operates.

Court membership
- Chief Justice John Roberts Associate Justices John P. Stevens · Antonin Scalia; Anthony Kennedy · David Souter; Clarence Thomas · Ruth Bader Ginsburg; Stephen Breyer · Samuel Alito

Case opinions
- Majority: Ginsburg, joined by Kennedy, Souter, Breyer, Alito
- Dissent: Stevens, joined by Roberts, Scalia
- Thomas took no part in the consideration or decision of the case.

Laws applied
- National Bank Act

Watters v. Wachovia Bank, N.A., 550 U.S. 1 (2007), was a United States Supreme Court case in which the court held that the mortgage business of a nationally chartered bank, whether conducted by the bank itself or through the bank's operating subsidiary, is subject to the Office of the Comptroller of the Currency's superintendence, and not to the licensing, reporting, and visitorial regimes of the several states in which the subsidiary operates.

== Background ==
National banks' business activities are controlled by the National Bank Act (NBA) and regulations promulgated thereunder by the Office of the Comptroller of the Currency (OCC). OCC is charged with supervision of the NBA and, thus, oversees the banks' operations and interactions with customers. The NBA grants OCC, as part of its supervisory authority, visitorial powers to audit the banks' books and records, largely to the exclusion of other state or federal entities. The NBA specifically authorizes federally chartered banks to engage in real estate lending and "[t]o exercise... such incidental powers as shall be necessary to carry on the business of banking". Among those incidental powers, national banks may conduct certain activities through "operating subsidiaries," discrete entities authorized to engage solely in activities the bank itself could undertake, and subject to the same terms and conditions as the bank.

Wachovia Bank was an OCC-chartered national banking association that conducted its real estate lending business through Wachovia Mortgage Corporation, a wholly owned, North Carolina-chartered entity licensed as an operating subsidiary by OCC, and doing business in Michigan and elsewhere. Michigan law exempts banks, both national and state, from state mortgage lending regulation, but requires their subsidiaries to register with the state's Office of Insurance and Financial Services (OIFS) and submit to state supervision. Although Wachovia Mortgage initially complied with Michigan's requirements, it surrendered its Michigan registration once it became a wholly owned operating subsidiary of Wachovia Bank.

Subsequently, Watters, the OIFS Commissioner, advised Wachovia Mortgage that it would no longer be authorized to engage in mortgage lending in Michigan. Whachovia Bank sued for declaratory and injunctive relief, contending that the NBA and OCC's regulations preempt application of the relevant Michigan mortgage lending laws to a national bank's operating subsidiary. Watters responded that, because Wachovia Mortgage was not itself a national bank, the challenged Michigan laws were applicable and were not preempted. She also argued that the Tenth Amendment to the US Constitution prohibits OCC's exclusive regulation and supervision of national banks' lending activities conducted through operating subsidiaries. Rejecting those arguments, the Federal District Court granted the Wachovia plaintiffs summary judgment in relevant part, and the Sixth Circuit Court of Appeals affirmed.

== Opinion of the court ==
The Supreme Court issued an opinion on April 17, 2007.

== Later developments ==
Wachovia Bank went defunct in 2008.

== See also ==
- Wachovia Bank, N.A. v. Schmidt
