= Wachovia =

Defunct banking company

- Type: Public
- Traded as: NYSE: WB S&P 500 component (until 2008)
- Industry: Financial services
- Founded: June 16, 1879; 147 years ago
- Defunct: December 31, 2008; 17 years ago (as an independent corporation); October 15, 2011; 15 years ago (as a brand)
- Fate: Acquired by Wells Fargo
- Successor: Wells Fargo
- Headquarters: Charlotte, North Carolina, U.S.
- Products: Banking, Investments
- Parent: Wells Fargo
- Website: Archived official website at the Wayback Machine (archive index)

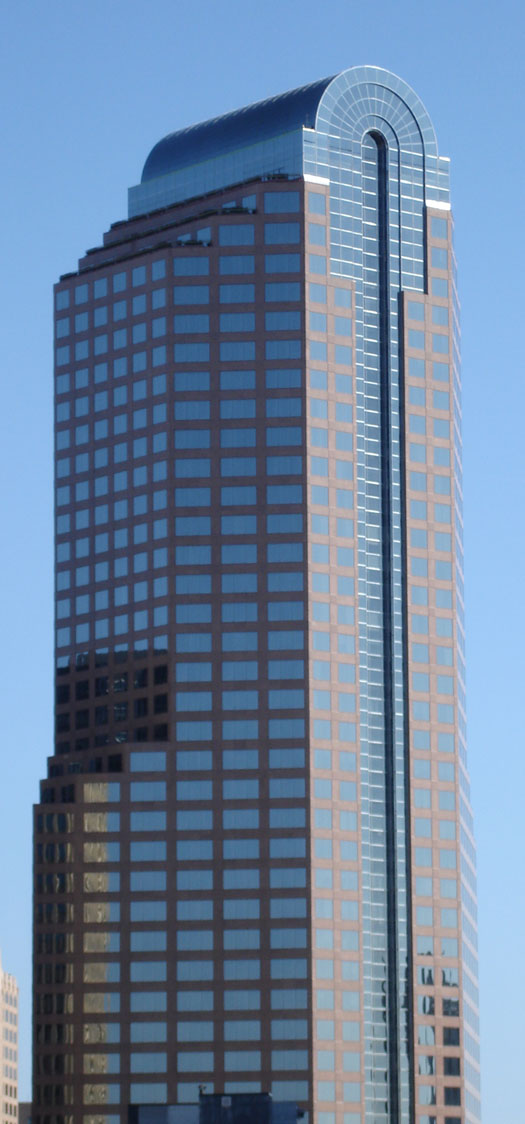
One Wells Fargo Center, formerly One Wachovia Center. The former corporate headquarters of Wachovia in Charlotte, North Carolina.

Wachovia was a diversified financial services company based in Charlotte, North Carolina. Before its acquisition by Wells Fargo and Company in 2008, Wachovia was the fourth-largest bank holding company in the United States, based on total assets. Wachovia provided a broad range of banking, asset management, wealth management, and corporate and investment banking products and services. At its height, it was one of the largest providers of financial services in the United States, operating financial centers in 21 states and Washington, D.C., with locations from Connecticut to Florida and west to California. Wachovia provided global services through more than 40 offices around the world.

The acquisition of Wachovia by Wells Fargo was completed on December 31, 2008, after a government-forced sale to avoid Wachovia's failure. The Wachovia brand was absorbed into the Wells Fargo brand in a process that lasted three years. On October 15, 2011, the final Wachovia branches were converted to Wells Fargo.

The company's corporate and institutional capital markets and investment banking groups operated under the Wachovia Securities brand, while its asset management group operated under the Evergreen Investments brand until 2010, when the Evergreen fund family merged with Wells Fargo Advantage Funds, and institutional and high-net-worth products merged with Wells Capital Management and its affiliates. Wachovia's private equity arm operated as Wachovia Capital Partners. The asset-based lending group operated as Wachovia Capital Finance.

The company got its name from the Wachovia Tract.

== History ==
=== First Union ===
First Union logo

The 1986–2002 legacy Wachovia logo

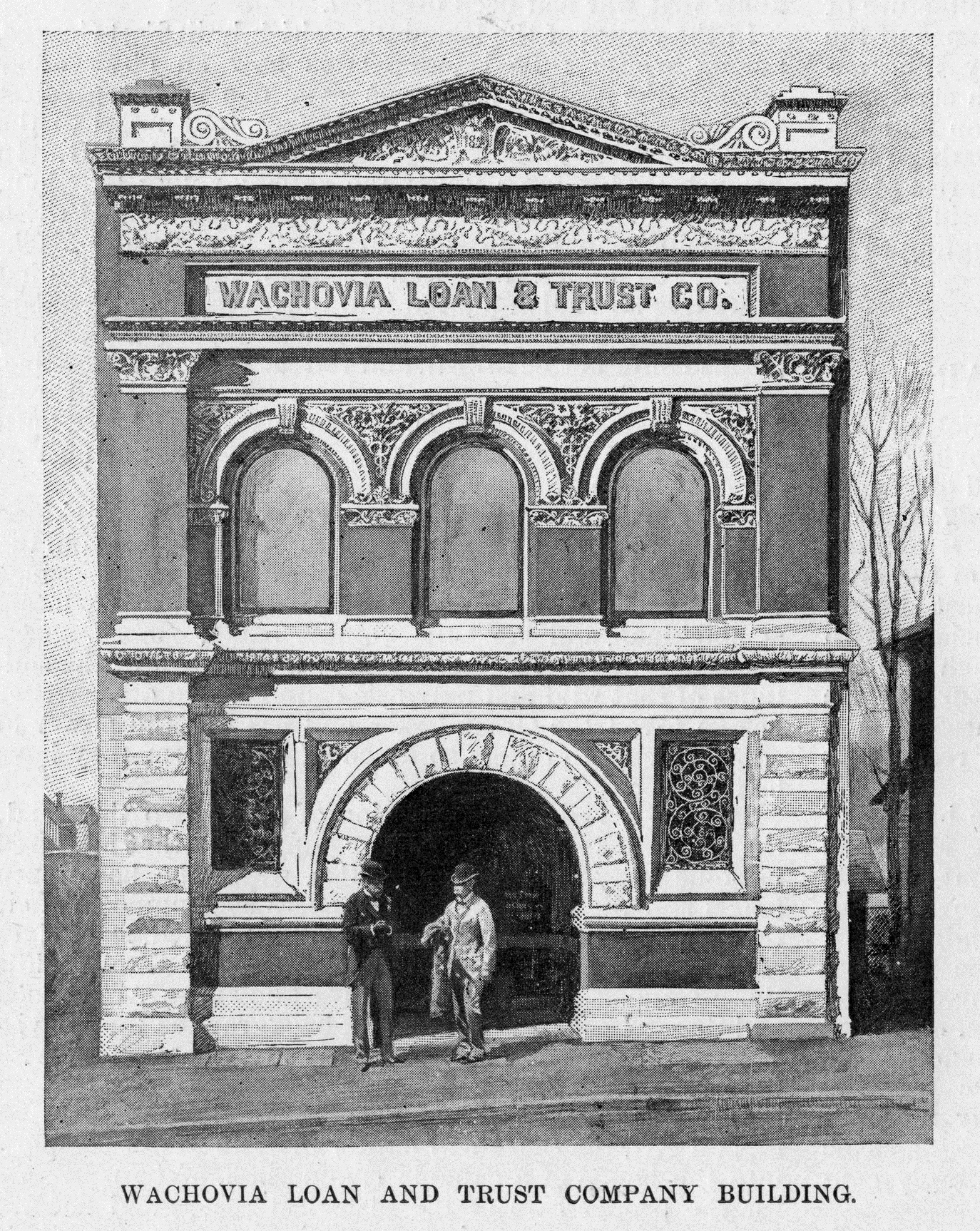
The first Wachovia Loan And Trust Company Building, located in Winston-Salem

First Union was founded as Union National Bank on June 2, 1908, a small banking desk in the lobby of a Charlotte hotel by H.M. Victor.

The bank merged with First National Bank and Trust Company of Asheville, North Carolina, in 1958 to become First Union National Bank of North Carolina. First Union Corporation was incorporated in 1967.

By the 1990s, it had grown into a Southern regional powerhouse in a strategy mirroring its longtime rival on Tryon Street in Charlotte, NCNB (later NationsBank and now Bank of America). In 1995, however, it acquired First Fidelity Bancorporation of Newark, New Jersey; at one stroke becoming a major player in the Northeast. Its Northeastern footprint grew even larger in 1998, when it acquired CoreStates Financial Corporation of Philadelphia. One of CoreStates' predecessors, the Bank of North America, had been the first bank proposed, chartered and incorporated in America on December 31, 1781. A former Bank of North America branch in Philadelphia remains in operation today as a Wells Fargo branch.

=== Wachovia ===
Wachovia Corporation began on June 16, 1879, in Winston-Salem, North Carolina, as the Wachovia National Bank. The bank was co-founded by James Alexander Gray and William Lemly. In 1911, the bank merged with Wachovia Loan and Trust Company, "the largest trust company between Baltimore and New Orleans", which had been founded on June 15, 1893. Wachovia grew to become one of the largest banks in the Southeast partly on the strength of its accounts from the R.J. Reynolds Tobacco Company, which was also headquartered in Winston-Salem. As of December 31, 1964, Wachovia was the first bank in the Southeastern United States to exceed $1 billion in resources. Hugh Durden was hired in 1972. He rose through the ranks to become President of Wachovia.

On December 12, 1986, Wachovia purchased First Atlanta. Founded as Atlanta National Bank on September 14, 1865, and later renamed to First National Bank of Atlanta, this institution was the oldest national bank in Atlanta. This purchase made Wachovia one of the few companies with dual headquarters: one in Winston-Salem and one in Atlanta. In 1991, Wachovia entered the South Carolina market by acquiring South Carolina National Corporation, founded as the Bank of Charleston in 1834. Durden shifted to President of Wachovia Corporate Services during 1994. In 1998, Wachovia acquired two Virginia-based banks, Jefferson National Bank and Central Fidelity Bank. In 1997, Wachovia acquired both 1st United Bancorp and American Bankshares Inc, giving its first entry into Florida. In 2000, Wachovia made its final purchase, which was Republic Security Bank.

=== Merger of First Union and Wachovia ===
On April 16, 2001, First Union announced it would acquire Wachovia, through the exchange of approximately $13.4 billion in First Union stock. First Union offered two of its shares for each Wachovia share outstanding. The announcement was made by Wachovia chairman L.M. "Bud" Baker Jr. and First Union chairman Ken Thompson. Baker would become chairman of the merged bank, while Thompson would become president and CEO. First Union was the acquiring party and nominal survivor, and the merged bank was based in Charlotte and adopted First Union's corporate structure and retained First Union's pre-2001 stock price history. However, as an important part of the merger, the merged bank took Wachovia's name and stock ticker symbol; despite First Union technically being the surviving identity and acquiring party.

This merger was viewed with surprise by the financial press and security analysts. While Wachovia had been viewed as an acquisition candidate after running into problems with earnings and credit quality in 2000, the suitor shocked analysts as some speculated that Wachovia would be sold to Atlanta-based SunTrust.

The deal was met with skepticism and criticism. Analysts, remembering the problems with the CoreStates acquisition, were concerned about First Union's ability to merge with another large company. Winston-Salem's citizens and politicians suffered a blow to their civic pride because the merged company would be based in Charlotte. The city of Winston-Salem was concerned both by job losses and the loss of stature from losing a major corporate headquarters. First Union was concerned by the potential deposit attrition and customer loss in the city. First Union responded to these concerns by placing the wealth management and Carolinas-region headquarters in Winston-Salem.

On May 14, 2001, SunTrust announced a rival takeover bid for Wachovia, the first hostile takeover attempt in the banking sector in years. In its effort to make the deal appeal to investors, SunTrust argued that it would provide a smoother transition than First Union and offered a higher cash price for Wachovia stock than First Union.

Wachovia's board of directors rejected SunTrust's offer and supported the merger with First Union. SunTrust continued its hostile takeover attempt, leading to a bitter battle over the summer between SunTrust and First Union. Both banks increased their offers for Wachovia, took out newspaper ads, mailed letters to shareholders, and initiated court battles to challenge each other's takeover bids. On August 3, 2001, Wachovia shareholders approved the First Union deal, rejecting SunTrust's attempts to elect a new board of directors for Wachovia and ending SunTrust's hostile takeover attempt.

Another complication concerned each bank's credit card division. In April 2001, Wachovia had agreed to sell its $8 billion credit card portfolio to Bank One. The cards, which would have still been branded as Wachovia, would have been issued through Bank One's First USA division. First Union had sold its credit card portfolio to MBNA in August 2000. After entering into negotiations, the new Wachovia agreed to buy back its portfolio from Bank One in September 2001 and resell it to MBNA. Wachovia paid Bank One a $350 million termination fee.

On September 4, 2001, First Union and Wachovia officially merged. In order to prevent a repeat of the CoreStates problems, the new Wachovia gradually phased-in the conversion of legacy Wachovia computer systems to First Union systems. The company first began converting systems in the southeast United States where both banks had branches, before moving to First Union's branches in the Northeast, which only had to change their signs to reflect the new company name and logo. This process was completed on August 18, 2003, almost 2 years after the merger.

In comparison to the CoreStates purchase, the acquisition of Wachovia by First Union was considered successful by analysts. The company's deliberate pace of conversion prevented any large-scale customer attrition. In fact, Wachovia was ranked number one in customer satisfaction among major banks by the University of Michigan's annual American Customer Satisfaction Index for every year after the merger.

When Wachovia and First Union merged, Charlotte's One, Two, and Three First Union buildings became One, Two, and Three Wachovia Center (respectively), and the 55-story First Union Financial Center in downtown Miami became the Wachovia Financial Center. The merger also affected the names of the indoor professional sports arenas in Philadelphia and Wilkes-Barre, Pennsylvania. Formerly known as the First Union Center and the First Union Spectrum (both Philadelphia) and First Union Arena (Wilkes-Barre), they were renamed the Wachovia Center (now known as Xfinity Mobile Arena), Wachovia Spectrum (which was later demolished), and Wachovia Arena at Casey Plaza (now known as Mohegan Sun Arena at Casey Plaza), respectively.

=== Merger and acquisition history ===
A graphic illustration of the company's major mergers, acquisitions, and historical predecessors, up to the 2001 merger of Wachovia and First Union:

- Wachovia(merged 2001)
  - First Union Corp.(est. 1908)
    - First Union Corporation(Formerly: First Union National Bank)(est. 1958)
      - Union National Bank(est. 1908)
      - First National Bank & Trust
    - CoreStates Financial(dates to 1781)
  - Wachovia Corporation(merged 1986)
    - Wachovia Bank & Trust(merged 1911)
      - Wachovia National Bank(Formerly: Bank of Salem)(est. 1879)
      - Wachovia Loan & Trust (est. 1893)
    - First Atlanta(Formerly Atlanta National Bank)(est. 1865)

=== Acquisitions ===
Between 2001 and 2006, Wachovia bought several other financial services companies in an attempt to become a national bank and comprehensive financial services company.

While First Union was merging into Wachovia, they changed the Wachovia logo to a square with wave like lines, the green color represents First Union while the blue represents the main company. They have also released new merchandise such as t-shirts, and provided other things such as retractable keychains, cups, and coffee mugs to show the success during 2001 to its acquisition by Wells Fargo.

==== Prudential Securities ====
Wachovia Securities and the Prudential Securities Division of Prudential Financial, Inc. combined to form Wachovia Securities LLC on July 1, 2003. Wachovia owned a controlling 62% stake, while Prudential Financial retained the remaining 38%. At the time, the new firm had client assets of $532.1 billion, making it the nation's third largest full service retail brokerage firm, based on assets.

==== Metropolitan West Securities ====
On October 22, 2003, Wachovia announced it would acquire Metropolitan West Securities, an affiliate company of Metropolitan West Financial. This acquisition added a portfolio of over $50 billion of securities on loan to the Wachovia Global Securities Lending division.

==== SouthTrust ====
On November 1, 2004, Wachovia completed the acquisition of Birmingham, Alabama-based SouthTrust Corporation, a transaction valued at $14.3 billion. The merger created the largest bank in the southeast United States, the fourth largest bank in terms of holdings, and the second largest in terms of number of branches. Integration was completed by the end of 2005.

==== Failed MBNA purchase ====
In June 2005, Wachovia negotiated to purchase monoline credit card company MBNA. However, the deal fell through when Wachovia balked at MBNA's purchase price. Within a week of the deal's collapse, MBNA entered into an agreement to be purchased by Wachovia's chief rival, Bank of America. Wachovia received $100 million as the result of an agreement Wachovia predecessor First Union made in 2000 when it sold its credit card portfolio to MBNA. This agreement required MBNA to pay this sum if it were ever sold to a competitor. In late 2005 Wachovia announced that it would end its relationship with MBNA and create its own credit card division so that the bank could issue its own Visa cards.

==== Westcorp ====
Westcorp logo

Westcorp, Western Financial Bank's parent company, WFS Financial Inc. and Wachovia announced a proposed acquisition by Wachovia in September 2005. Westcorp and WFS Financial Inc. shareholders approved the acquisition on Jan. 6, 2006 and on March 1, 2006, the merger was completed. This acquisition made Wachovia the ninth largest auto finance lender in the competitive U.S. auto finance market and provided Wachovia with a small retail and commercial banking presence in Southern California. On February 12, 2007, the former 19 Western Financial Bank branches opened under the Wachovia name. These branches became the launching point for a much larger Wachovia presence in California with the acquisition and integration of World Savings Bank in 2007.

==== Golden West Financial/World Savings Bank ====
Wachovia agreed to purchase Golden West Financial for a little under $25.5 billion on May 7, 2006. This acquisition gave Wachovia an additional 285-branch network spanning 10 states. Wachovia raised its profile in California, where Golden West held $32 billion in deposits and operated 123 branches.

Golden West, which operated branches under the name World Savings Bank, was the second largest savings and loan in the United States. The business was a small savings and loan in the San Francisco Bay area when it was purchased in 1963 for $4 million by Herbert and Marion Sandler. Golden West specialized in option ARMs loans, marketed under the name "Pick-A-Pay". These loans gave the borrower a choice of payment plans, including the option to defer paying a part of the interest owed, which was then added onto the balance of the loan. In 2006, Golden West Financial was named the "Most Admired Company" in the mortgage services business by Fortune magazine. By the time Wachovia announced its acquisition, Golden West had over $125 billion in assets and 11,600 employees. By October 2, 2006, Wachovia had closed the acquisition of Golden West Financial Corporation. The Sandlers agreed to remain on the board at Wachovia.

The Sandlers sold their firm at the top of the market, saying that they were growing older and wanted to devote themselves to philanthropy. A year earlier, in 2005, World Savings lending had started to slow, after more than quadrupling since 1998. Some current and former Wachovia officials said that the merger was agreed to within days, making it impossible to thoroughly vet the World Savings loan portfolio. They noted that the creditworthiness of World Savings borrowers edged down from 2004 to 2006, while Pick-A-Pay borrowers had credit scores well below the industry average for traditional loans. World Savings lending volume dipped again in 2006 shortly after the sale to Wachovia was initiated. In 2007, after the merger, World Savings, then known as Wachovia Mortgage began to attract more borrowers by allowing them to make monthly payments with annual interest rates as low as 1.5%, which was viewed negatively by regulators. While Wachovia Mortgage continued to scrutinize borrowers' ability to manage increased payments, the move to rock-bottom rates lured customers whose financial reliability was more difficult to verify. More than 70% of the Pick-A-Pay loans were made in California, Florida and Arizona, where home prices had declined severely. In 2009 New York Times reporter Floyd Norris called World Savings a "ticking timebomb" that created "zombie homeowners".

While Wachovia Chairman and CEO G. Kennedy "Ken" Thompson had described Golden West as a "crown jewel", investors did not react positively to the deal. Analysts said that Wachovia purchased Golden West at the peak of the US housing boom. Wachovia Mortgage's mortgage-related problems led to Wachovia suffering writedowns and losses that far exceeded the price paid in the acquisition, ending up in the fire-sale of Wachovia to Wells Fargo.

==== A. G. Edwards ====

On May 31, 2007, Wachovia announced plans to purchase A. G. Edwards for $6.8 billion to create the United States' second largest retail brokerage firm. The acquisition closed on October 1, 2007. In early March 2008 Wachovia began to phase out the A.G. Edwards brand in favor of a unified Wachovia Securities.

== Historical data (2000–2008) ==
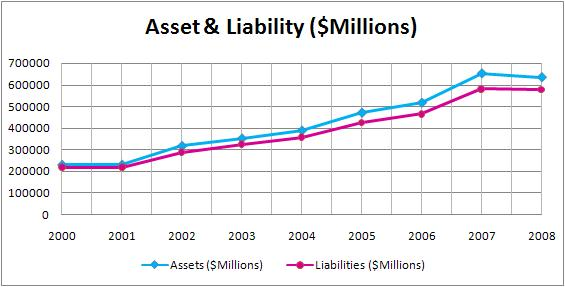
Asset & Liability

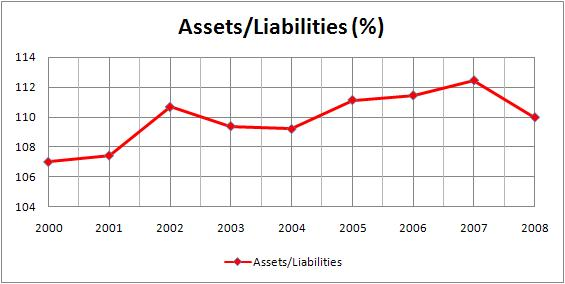
Asset/Liability

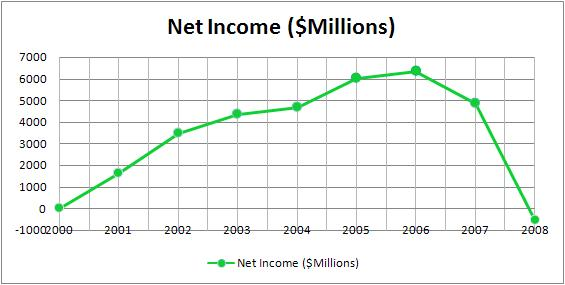
Net Income

Wachovia, excluding subsidiaries, was the fourth largest bank at the end of 2008.

== 2008 financial crisis ==
Exposed to risky loans, such as adjustable rate mortgages acquired during the acquisition of Golden West Financial in 2006, Wachovia began to experience heavy losses in its loan portfolios during the subprime mortgage crisis.

On June 2, 2008, Wachovia chief executive officer G. Kennedy Thompson was ousted. The board replaced him on an interim basis with Chairman Lanty Smith. Smith had already replaced Thompson as chairman a month earlier.

In the second quarter of 2008, Wachovia reported a loss of $8.9 billion and announced 10,000 layoffs.

On July 9, 2008, Wachovia hired Treasury Undersecretary Robert K. Steel as chief executive in hopes that his experience would lead the company out of its difficulties.

=== Government intervention ===
After Steel took over, he insisted that Wachovia would stay independent. However, on September 26, Washington Mutual was seized by regulators triggering a bank run at Wachovia. Ultimately, Wachovia lost a total of $5 billion in deposits that day—about 1% of the bank's total deposits. The large outflow of deposits attracted the attention of the Office of the Comptroller of the Currency, which regulates national banks. Federal regulators pressured Wachovia to put itself up for sale over the weekend. Had Wachovia suffered from bank failure, it would have been a severe drain on the FDIC's insurance fund due to its size (it operated one of the largest branch networks on the East Coast).

As business halted for the weekend, Wachovia was already in FDIC-brokered talks with Citigroup and Wells Fargo; the latter company initially emerged as the frontrunner to acquire the ailing Wachovia's banking operations. Wells Fargo originally backed out of this particular deal due to concerns over Wachovia's commercial loans. With no deal in place as September 28 dawned, regulators were concerned that Wachovia would not have enough short-term funding to open for business the next day. In order to obtain enough liquidity to do business, banks usually depend on short-term loans to each other. However, the markets had been so battered by a credit crisis related to the housing bubble that banks were skittish about making such loans. Under the circumstances, regulators feared that if customers pulled out more money, Wachovia would not have enough liquidity to meet its obligations. This would have resulted in a failure dwarfing that of WaMu.

When FDIC Chairwoman Sheila Bair got word of Wachovia's situation, she initially decided to handle the situation the same way she handled WaMu a day earlier. Under this scenario, the Comptroller of the Currency would have seized Wachovia's banking assets (Wachovia Bank, N.A. and Wachovia Bank of Delaware, N.A.) and placed them under the receivership of the FDIC, which would have then sold the banking assets to the highest bidder. Bair called Steel on September 28 and told him that the FDIC would be auctioning off Wachovia's banking assets. Bair felt this would best protect the small banks. However, several federal regulators, led by New York Fed President Tim Geithner, felt such a course would be politically unjustifiable so soon after WaMu's seizure.

After a round of mediation between Geithner and Bair, the FDIC declared that Wachovia was "systemically important" to the health of the economy, and thus could not be allowed to fail. It was the first time the FDIC had made such a determination since the passage of a 1991 law allowing the FDIC to handle large bank failures on short notice. Later that night, in an FDIC-brokered deal, Citigroup agreed to buy Wachovia's retail banking operations in an "open bank" transfer of ownership. The transaction would have been facilitated by the FDIC, with the concurrence of the Board of Governors of the Federal Reserve and the Secretary of the Treasury in consultation with the President. The FDIC's open bank assistance procedures normally require the FDIC to find the cheapest way to rescue a failing bank. However, when a bank is deemed "systemically important," the FDIC is allowed to bypass this requirement. Steel had little choice but to agree, and the decision was announced on the morning of September 29, roughly 45 minutes before the markets opened. Citigroup then became the source of liquidity, allowing Wachovia to continue to operate until the acquisition was complete.

In its announcement, the FDIC stressed that Wachovia did not fail and was not placed into receivership. In addition, the FDIC said that the agency would absorb Citigroup's losses above $42 billion; Wachovia's loan portfolio was valued at $312 billion. In exchange for assuming this risk, the FDIC would receive $12 billion in preferred stock and warrants from Citigroup. The transaction would have been an all-stock transfer, with Wachovia Corporation stockholders to have received stock from Citigroup, valuing Wachovia stock at about one dollar per share for a total transaction value of about $2.16 billion. Citigroup would have also assumed Wachovia's senior and subordinated debt. Citigroup intended to sell ten billion dollars of new stock on the open market to recapitalize its purchased banking operations. The proposed closing date for the Wachovia purchase was by the end of the year, 2008.

Wachovia expected to continue as a publicly traded company, retaining its retail brokerage arm, Wachovia Securities and Evergreen mutual funds. At the time, Wachovia Securities had 14,600 financial advisers and managed more than $1 trillion, third in the U.S. after Merrill Lynch and Citigroup's Smith Barney.

The announcement drew some criticism from Wachovia stockholders who felt the dollar-per-share price was too cheap. Some of them planned to try to defeat the deal when it came up for shareholder approval. However, institutional investors such as mutual funds and pension funds controlled 73 percent of Wachovia's stock; individual stockholders would have had to garner a significant amount of support from institutional shareholders to derail the sale. Also, several experts in corporate dealmaking told The Charlotte Observer that such a strategy is risky since federal regulators helped broker the deal. One financial expert told the Observer that if Wachovia's shareholders voted the deal down, the OCC could have simply seized Wachovia and placed it into the receivership of the FDIC, which would then sell it to Citigroup. Had this happened, the shareholders of Wachovia risked being completely wiped out.

=== Acquisition by Wells Fargo ===
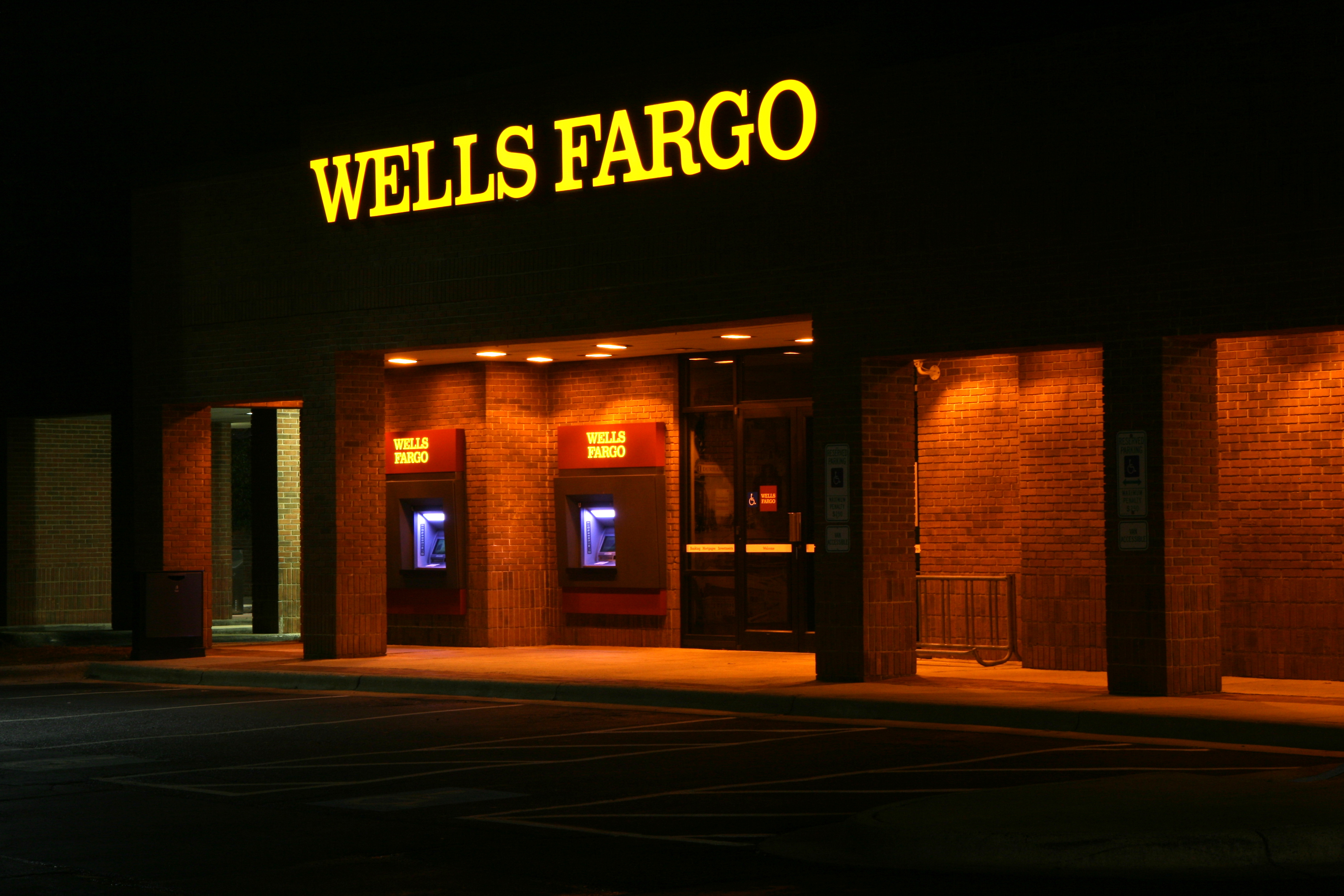
A Wells Fargo branch in Durham, North Carolina; previously a Wachovia branch until 2011.

Though Citigroup was providing the liquidity that allowed Wachovia to continue to operate, Wells Fargo and Wachovia announced on October 3, 2008, that they had agreed to merge in an all-stock transaction requiring no government involvement. Wells Fargo announced it had agreed to acquire all of Wachovia for $15.1 billion in stock. Wachovia preferred the Wells Fargo deal because it would be worth more than the Citigroup deal and keep all of its businesses intact. Also, there is far less overlap between the banks, as Wells Fargo is dominant in the West and Midwest compared to the redundant footprint of Wachovia and Citibank along the East Coast. Both companies' boards unanimously approved the merger on the night of October 2.

Citigroup explored its legal options and demanded that Wachovia and Wells Fargo cease discussions, claiming that Wells Fargo engaged in "tortious interference" with an exclusivity agreement between Citigroup and Wachovia. That agreement states in part that until October 6, 2008 "Wachovia shall not, and shall not permit any of its subsidiaries or any of its or their respective officers, directors, [...] to [...] take any action to facilitate or encourage the submission of any Acquisition Proposal."

Citigroup convinced Judge Charles E. Ramos of the Supreme Court of the State of New York, New York County to grant a preliminary injunction temporarily blocking the Wells Fargo deal. This ruling was later overturned by Judge James M. McGuire of the Supreme Court of the State of New York, Appellate Division, First Department, partly because he believed Ramos did not have the right to rule on the case in Connecticut.

On October 9, 2008, Citigroup abandoned its attempt to purchase Wachovia's banking assets, allowing the Wachovia-Wells Fargo merger to go through. However, Citigroup pursued $60 billion in claims, $20 billion in compensatory and $40 billion in punitive damages, against Wachovia and Wells Fargo for alleged violations of the exclusivity agreement. Wells Fargo settled this dispute with Citigroup Inc. for $100 Million on November 19, 2010. Citigroup may have been pressured by regulators to back out of the deal; Bair endorsed Wells Fargo's bid because it removed the FDIC from the picture. Geithner was furious, claiming that the FDIC's reversal would undermine the government's ability to quickly rescue failing banks. However, Geithner's colleagues at the Fed were not willing to take responsibility for selling Wachovia.

The Federal Reserve unanimously approved the merger with Wells Fargo on October 12, 2008.

The combined company retained the Wells Fargo name, and was based in San Francisco. However, Charlotte remained as the headquarters for the combined company's East Coast banking operations, and Wachovia Securities remained in Charlotte. Three members of the Wachovia board joined the Wells Fargo board. The merger created the largest branch network in the United States.

In filings unsealed two days before the merger approval in a New York federal court, Citigroup argued that its own deal was better for U.S. taxpayers and Wachovia shareholders. It said that it had exposed itself to "substantial economic risk" by stating its intent to rescue Wachovia after less than 72 hours of due diligence. Citigroup had obtained an exclusive agreement in order to protect itself. Wachovia suffered a $23.9 billion loss in the third quarter.

In September 2008, the Internal Revenue Service issued a notice providing tax breaks to companies that acquire troubled banks. According to analysts, these tax breaks were worth billions of dollars to Wells Fargo. Vice Chairman Bill Thomas of the Financial Crisis Inquiry Commission indicated that these tax breaks may have been a factor in Wells Fargo's decision to purchase Wachovia.

Wells Fargo's purchase of Wachovia closed on December 31, 2008. By the time Wells Fargo completed the acquisition of Wachovia, the byline "A Wells Fargo Company" was added to the logo.

=== Chief executive officers ===
- G. Kennedy Thompson (2001–2008)
- Robert K. Steel (2008)

== Controversies ==
=== Identity theft negligence ===
A May 2007 New York Times article described Wachovia's negligence in screening and taking action against companies linked with identity theft. With stolen identities, the companies used unsigned checks to remove funds from personal Wachovia bank accounts. In total, Wachovia accepted $142 million in unsigned checks from "companies that made unauthorized withdrawals from thousands of accounts", collecting millions of dollars in fees from them. According to Pat Meehan, a U.S. attorney for Eastern District of Pennsylvania, Wachovia received "thousands of warnings that it was processing fraudulent checks, but ignored them".

On April 25, 2008, Wachovia agreed to pay up to $144 million to end the investigation without admitting wrongdoing. The investigation found that Wachovia had failed to conduct suitable due diligence, and that it would have discovered the thefts if it had followed normal procedures. The penalty is one of the largest ever demanded by the Office of the Comptroller of the Currency.

=== Latin drug cartel money laundering ===
In April 2008, the Wall Street Journal reported that federal prosecutors had initiated a probe into Wachovia and other U.S. banks for aiding drug money laundering by Mexican and Colombian money-transfer companies, also known as casas de cambio. These companies help Mexican immigrants in the United States send remittances back to family in Mexico, but it is widely known that they also present a significant money-laundering risk. However, not only is it a "lucrative industry" that is able to charge high fees, but Wachovia also viewed it as a way to gain a foothold in the Hispanic banking market.

In March 2010, Wachovia admitted to having insufficient anti-money laundering controls on $378.4 billion of transfers between 2004 and 2007. The violations were described as "serious and systemic" and as the "largest violation of the Bank Secrecy Act". The oversight violations allowed Mexican and Colombian drug cartels to launder at least $110 million. Wachovia negotiated a deferred prosecution agreement with the Justice Department to resolve criminal charges for willfully failing to set up an effective anti-money-laundering program. It agreed to forfeit $110 million and pay a $50 million fine to the U.S. Treasury.

Reports in Bloomberg Businessweek in June 2010 and The Observer in April 2011 shed light on the extent to which Wachovia went to turn a blind eye, including by ignoring the warnings and suspicious activity reports (SARs) of its London-based director of anti-money-laundering.

== See also ==
- List of banks acquired or bankrupted during the Great Recession
- Watters v. Wachovia Bank, N.A., a United States Supreme Court case involving the bank and its mortgage-lending subsidiary.
- Wachovia Bank, N.A. v. Schmidt, a United States Supreme Court case about where banks reside for diversity jurisdiction purposes.
