= Pacific Life =

American insurance company

Pacific Life Insurance Company
- Logo, designed by Saul Bass posthumously introduced in 1999, three years after his death.

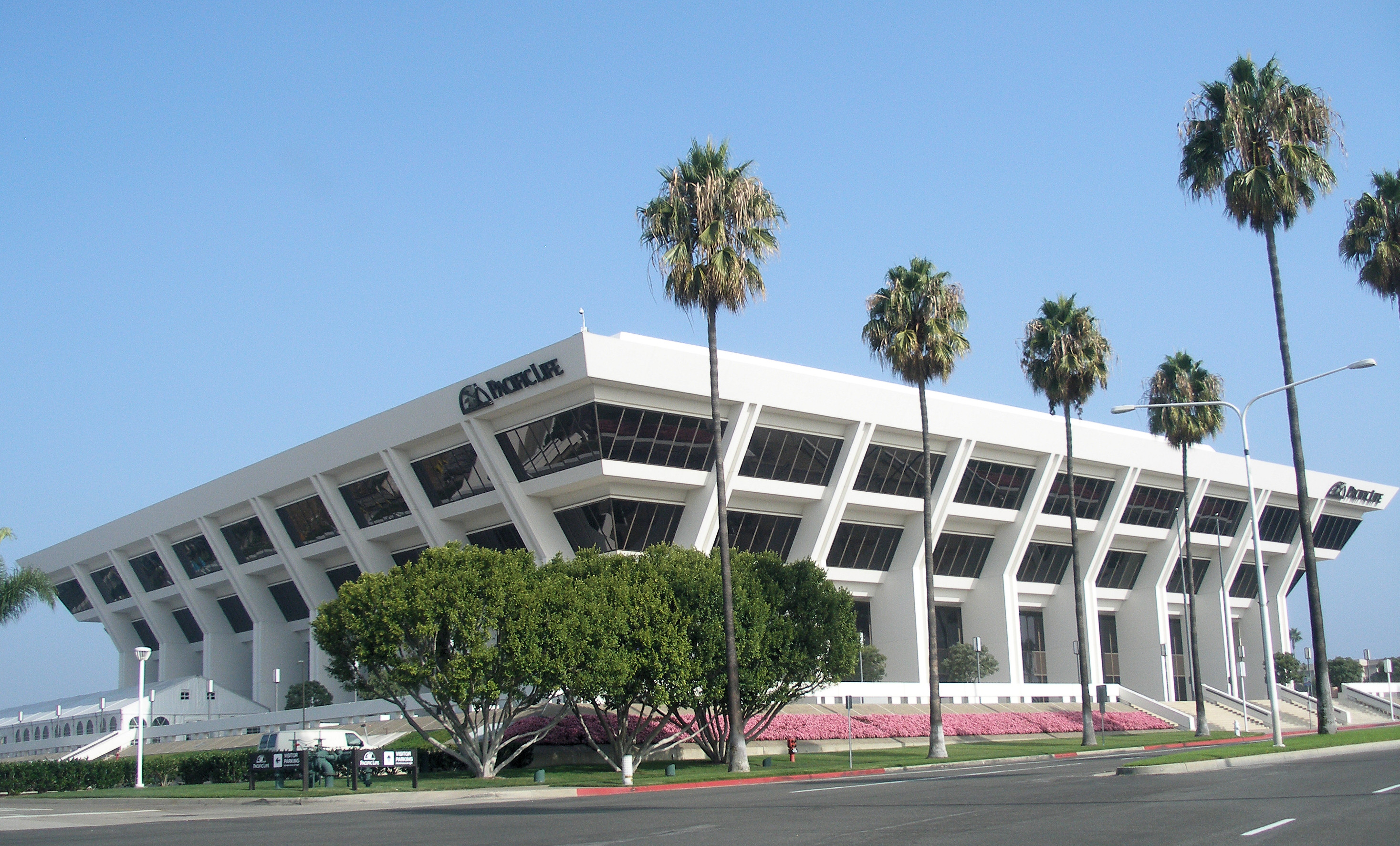
- Headquarters in Newport Beach
- Type: Mutual Holding Company
- Industry: Insurance; life insurance, annuities, investment products
- Founded: 1868; 158 years ago
- Founder: Simon Schreiber; Josiah Howell; Leland Stanford
- Headquarters: Newport Beach, California
- Key people: Darryl Button (president and CEO)
- Number of employees: 4,789 (2026)
- Parent: Pacific Mutual
- Website: www.pacificlife.com

Pacific Life Insurance Company is an American insurance company.

== History ==
Pacific Mutual Life was founded in 1868 by Simon Schreiber and Josiah Howell in Sacramento, California following passed legislation in 1866 allowing mutual insurance companies to be established in the state. President of Central Pacific Railroad and former California Governor Leland Stanford was named President in 1868 and was also was the first policy holder of the company. After Stanford died and his university (Stanford University) was strapped for money, his wife used the money from the policy to pay for professors. Starting in 1885, Pacific Mutual began issuing accident insurance, which was an innovative move for a life insurance company at the time. In 1906, a 7.8 magnitude earthquake hit San Francisco, Pacific Mutual’s headquarters survived the earthquake, but not the immense fires that tore through the city. Following the earthquake, Pacific Mutual moved the company to Los Angeles. In 1972, the company moved its headquarters to Newport Beach, California where it currently resides. Pacific Life has been domiciled in the state of Nebraska since 2005.

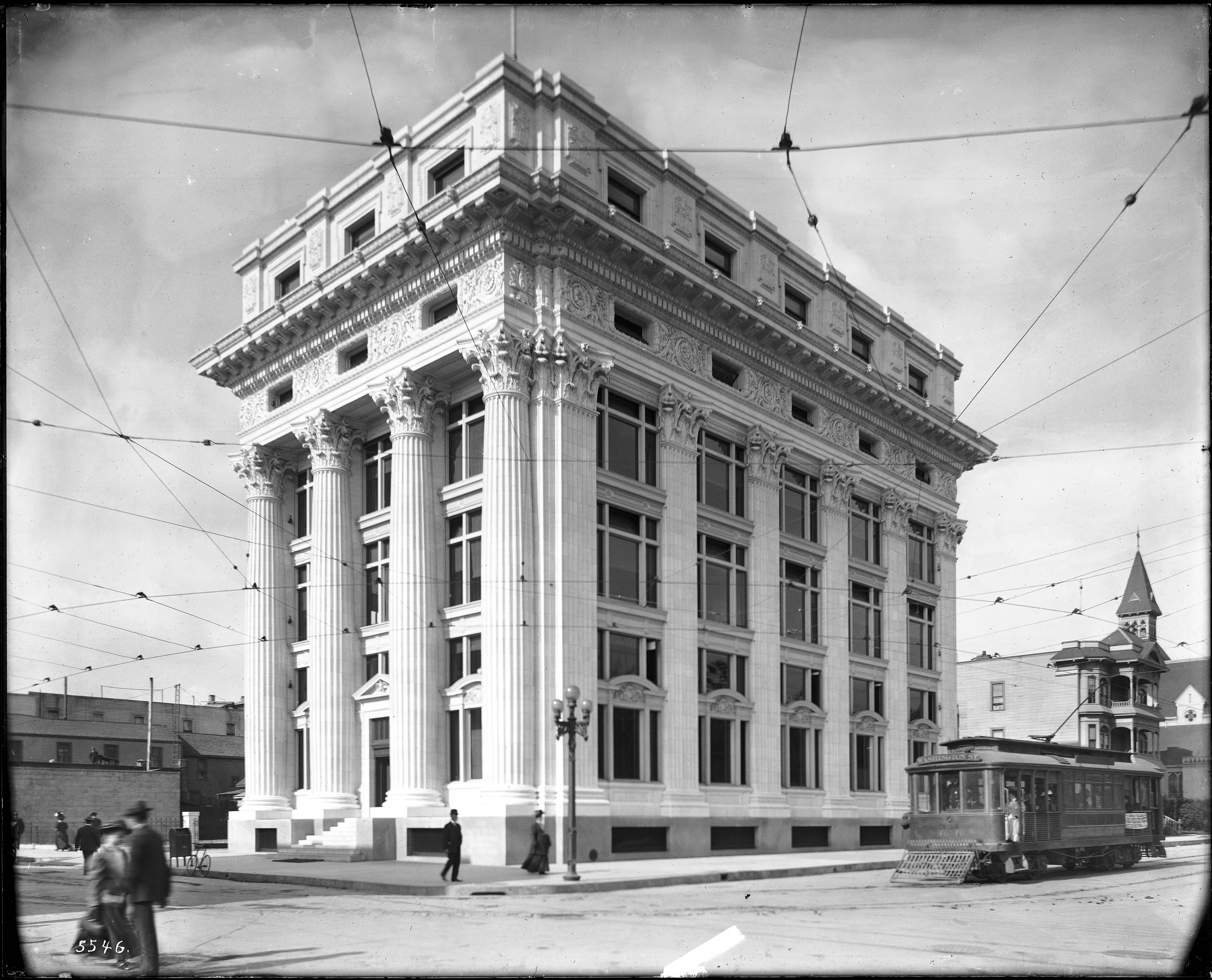
Pacific Mutual Life Insurance Building, Olive Street and Sixth Street, Los Angeles, c. 1909; one of the earliest designs by Parkinson and Bergstrom

During the Great Depression, the company was hit with hard times and in 1936 in an effort to save both the policy holders and the company the insurance commissioner, Samuel L. Carpenter, encouraged the policy holders to become part owners of the company through mutualization.

In 1955, Pacific Mutual Life became the first company west of the Mississippi River to use the brand new technology of the Univac I computer. At Pacific Mutual Life's one-hundredth birthday the company celebrated with keynote speaker Ronald Reagan. In 1971, the company started Pacific Investment Management Company (PIMCO). The company moved its headquarters to their current Newport Beach location in 1972 when management decided that Newport Beach would provide a better standard of living for their employees' families.

In 1997, the company dropped mutual from its name, changing it to Pacific Life Insurance Company. This reflects the company structure's change from a mutual ownership to a mutual holding company structure. Also in 1997, the company adopted the humpback whale as symbol of the company because of the whale's persistence, performance, and strength.

In 2001, Pacific Life became majority shareholder of Aviation Capital Group (ACG) which owns, manages, and leases commercial jet aircraft internationally, and offers aircraft asset management services. In August 2019, ACG reported that its equity value was $3.6 billion. In September 2019, it was reported that Pacific Life Insurance would sell its aviation unit for an estimated $3 billion to minority stockholder Tokyo Century Group, which owned 24.5% of Aviation Capital Group; the sale was completed on December 5, 2019.

On May 30, 2007, Pacific Asset Management was created. Pacific Asset Management offers advisory services and institutional fixed income management. Pacific Asset Management focuses on credit oriented fixed income. Pacific Asset Management's investment team manages bank loans, high yield corporate bonds, investment grade bonds and money market securities. Pacific Asset Management provides their clients the ability to invest with an entrepreneurial, boutique investment group focused on fundamental credit analysis and supported by the scale and infrastructure of Pacific Life. Pacific Asset Management currently manages registered investment companies under the Investment Company Act of 1940 as well as separate accounts. On April 17, 2023, Pacific Life completed the sale of Pacific Asset Management to Aristotle Capital Management.

The Pacific Life Foundation was established in 1984 and is headquartered in Newport Beach. Together with Pacific Life, the Foundation has contributed more than $170 million to community and national nonprofit organizations. Grants are made to organizations that address a broad spectrum of social needs.

In 2017, Pacific Life launched Swell Investing, a subsidiary focused purely on impact investing. The company facilitated investments in businesses that follow the guidelines of the UN High-level Political Forum on Sustainable Development. Founded in 2017, it was a financially backed subsidiary of Pacific Life. It was the first investment platform to focus exclusively on impact investment principles. Swell was not able to achieve the scale needed to sustain investment independent operations. As a result, on August 30, 2019, Swell was closed.

On April 1, 2022, Darryl Button assumed the role of president and CEO, becoming the 15th chief executive in Pacific Life's 154-year history, following Jim Morris' planned retirement.

On May 19, 2022, Pacific Life announced its intent to enter the workforce benefits marketplace.

On October 28, 2025, Pacific Life announced a footprint expansion to Charlotte, NC.
