= Evergreen Investments =

American investment fund

Evergreen Investment
- Company type: Subsidiary
- Industry: Finance
- Founded: 1932
- Defunct: June 20, 2010
- Headquarters: Boston, Massachusetts, and Charlotte, North Carolina, United States
- Key people: W. Douglas Munn, Pres. & CEO; David Germany, CIO
- Products: Financial services
- Parent: Wells Fargo
- Website: evergreeninvestments.com

Evergreen Investments was the investment management business of Wachovia. The brand was merged into Wells Fargo Advantage Funds and subsequently phased out following Wells Fargo's acquisition of Wachovia. The brand was officially retired on July 20, 2010.

Outside the United States, the sales and distribution business was conducted under the brand name of Wachovia Global Asset Management.

Evergreen Investments had US$245.9 billion in assets under management, 83 mutual funds, 2.7 million mutual fund shareholders and 1,064 employees as of June 30, 2008. Evergreen ranked among America's 30 largest asset management companies and one of the top 25 largest mutual fund families.

This mutual fund family promoted itself as a "broadly diversified asset management organization, with products and services distributed across several lines of business...managing diverse investments such as institutional portfolios, mutual funds, variable annuities, alternative investments and private accounts."

== History ==
Evergreen Investments traced its history to the brand name of Keystone Investments, which was first founded in 1932.

=== Keystone Investments: 1932–1996 ===
Keystone Investments created one of the first mutual fund families in the United States in 1932. It was employee-owned and operated until its merger with, First Union owned, Evergreen Funds. Keystone offered more than 25 retail mutual funds.

=== Keystone-Evergreen Merger: 1996–1998 ===
First Union Corporation, the parent company of the legacy Evergreen Funds, acquired the Keystone Fund Family and began the Evergreen-Keystone merger in 1996. The merger brought together the strengths of two industry leaders and by 1997 the Evergreen and Keystone funds were integrated under the surviving Evergreen brand name that would offer over 80 retail and institutional mutual funds.

The full merger was completed by January 1998. In that same year Evergreen Funds begins to operate with two sub divisions: the Retail Company and the Institutional Company.

=== Tattersall Advisory Group ===
In 1999, Evergreen acquired the Tattersall Advisory Group (TAG), an investment advisory firm specializing in fixed income management, as wholly owned, freestanding subsidiary of Evergreen Funds

=== First Union – Wachovia, Merger of Equals ===
On August 3, 2001, legacy Wachovia Corporation shareholders approved a "merger of equals" deal with Evergreen Fund's umbrella company, First Union Corporation, to create the new Wachovia Corporation, of which Evergreen became a subsidiary. The new entity shed the name of First Union and assumed the Wachovia identity and stock ticker. Analysts said this move was most likely to help First Union acquire a new identity, as Wachovia's reputation was far better with consumers than First Union.

Due to the "merger of equals" Evergreen Funds and the legacy Wachovia mutual funds were merged to form the Evergreen Funds.

=== Evergreen Investments ===
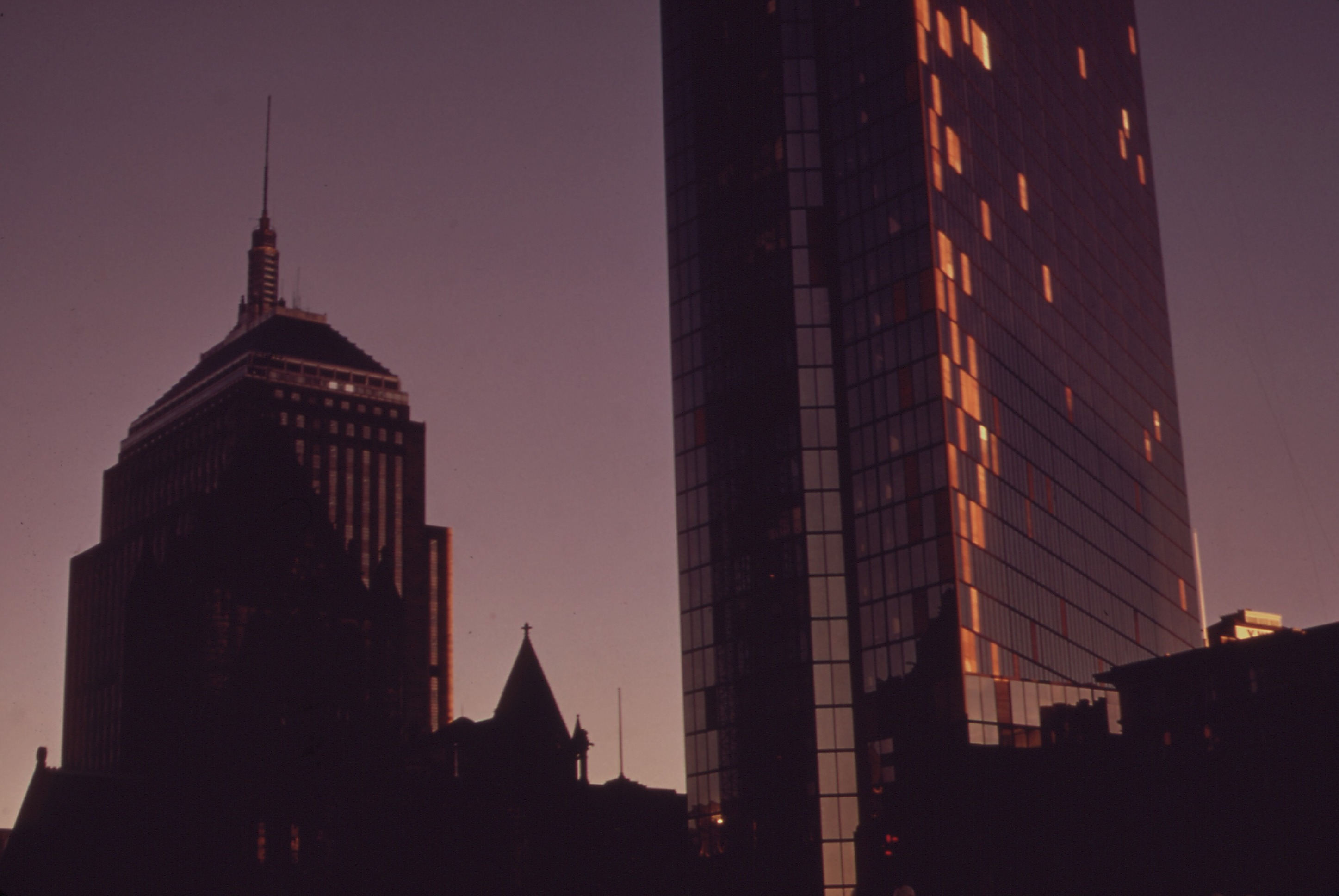
The Old John Hancock Building in Boston, Massachusetts, where Evergreen Investments was located

In 2002 Evergreen Retail and Institutional companies form and begin to operate under the umbrella asset management organization named Evergreen Investment Management Company, LLC. Evergreen mutual funds were then distributed by Evergreen Investment Services, Inc. and Evergreen Service Company, LLC is the transfer agent for the Evergreen Funds. Evergreen Fund Information

OFFIT, a separate subsidiary of the legacy Wachovia, acquired in 1999, becomes Evergreen OFFIT.

=== Relationship with GMO LLC ===
In 2003, Evergreen formed a relationship with GMO LLC to launch an asset allocation fund of funds. This presents investors with an opportunity to invest in an Evergreen product with underlying GMO institutional funds.

=== Acquisitions ===
In 2006, Evergreen acquired a majority interest in Metropolitan West Capital Management, LLC, an asset management firm noted for its intrinsic value strategies. It also launches Wachovia Global Asset Management, the brand name under which Evergreen sold and distributed investment products outside the United States. Due to Wachovia Corporation's May 2006 acquisition of Golden West Financial, a proposal was submitted to merge Golden West's Atlas mutual funds with corresponding Evergreen Funds.

The Atlas funds were successfully merged to corresponding Evergreen Funds by the end of May 2007. Evergreen acquired majority interest in European Credit Management Limited (ECM), a London-based provider of European credit absolute return solutions.

=== Market timing violations ===
On September 19, 2007, the United States Securities and Exchange Commission (SEC) announced that Evergreen Investments and affiliates would pay $32.5 million to settle market timing violations. Evergreen allowed some of its shareholders to market time trades, in violation of Evergreen's prospectus. William M. Ennis, a former officer of Evergreen paid $1 in disgorgement plus a civil penalty of $150,000.

=== Wells Fargo acquisition ===
Wells Fargo acquired Wachovia and the Evergreen brand was officially retired on July 20, 2010.
