= Metropolitan West Financial =

Diversified financial services holding company

- Company type: Private company
- Industry: Financial services
- Founded: 1992
- Defunct: 2010
- Fate: Acquired
- Successor: TCW Group / Wachovia
- Headquarters: Los Angeles, United States
- Owner: Wachovia

Metropolitan West Financial (also known as MetWest Ventures) was a diversified financial services holding company with interests in a variety of firms that provide financial advice and strategic planning, capital management, asset management, investment advice, and fixed-income portfolio management. The firm was split into sections and some was acquired in 2010 by TCW Group and the rest is owned by Wachovia. Although the company was acquired the name continues to be used in the MetWest fund.

== History ==
The acquisitive firm provides its services to businesses and high-net-worth individuals in the US. Before being acquired, it had more than $65 billion in assets under management. Clients include Boeing Employees Credit Union, American Airlines, California Public Employees' Retirement System, and Microsoft.

In 2001, Former Vice President Al Gore took a position with Metropolitan West Financial, developing business strategies in the fields of information technology and biotechnology.
