= Hong Wang =

Chinese mathematician (born 1991)

- 王虹
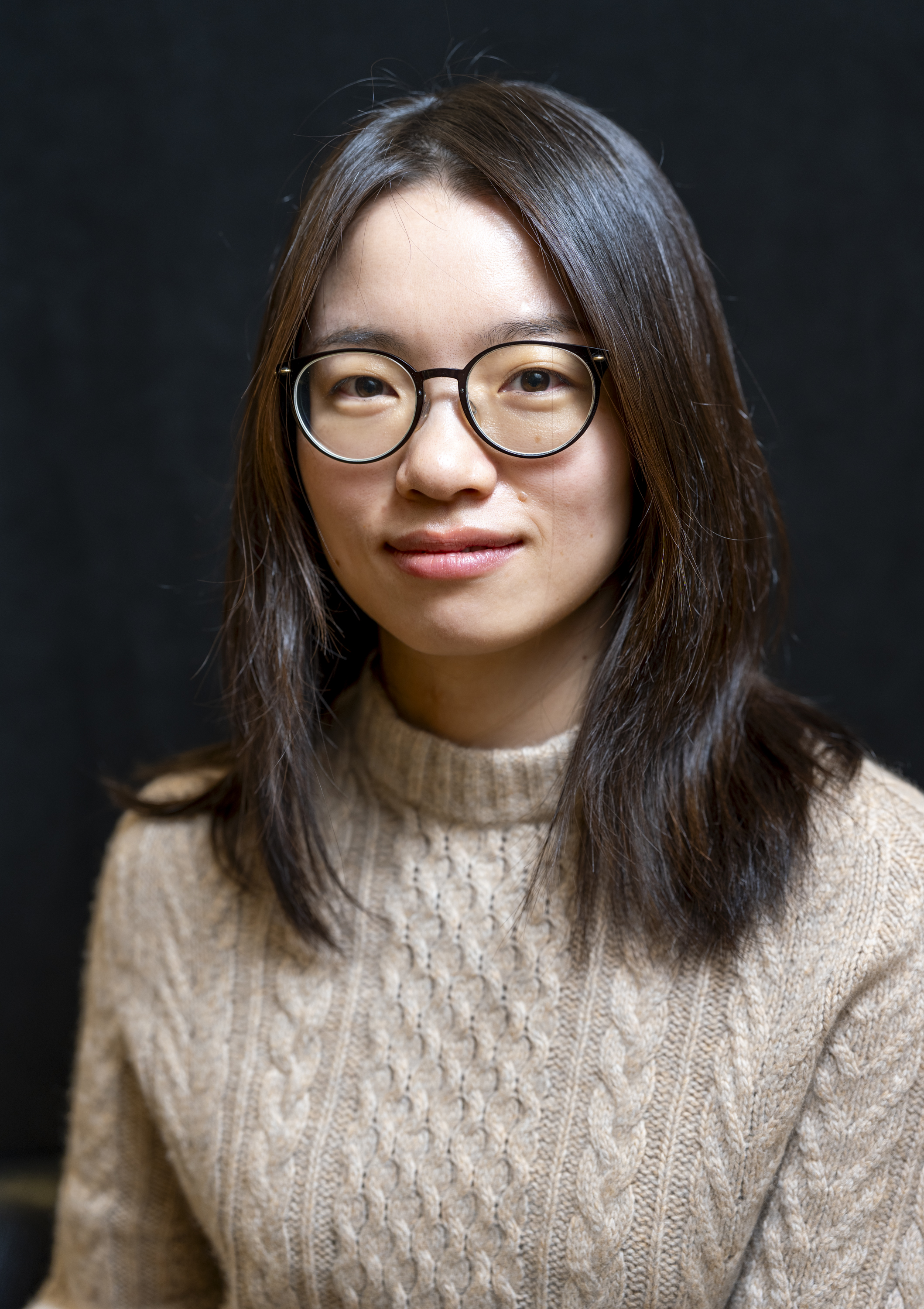
- Wang in 2026
- Born: Wang Hong; 1991 (age 34–35); Guilin, Guangxi, China
- Education: Peking University (BS); École polytechnique (Ing.); Paris-Sud University (MSc); Massachusetts Institute of Technology (PhD)
- Known for: Solving the Kakeya conjecture in three dimensions
- Awards: Maryam Mirzakhani New Frontiers Prize (2022); Salem Prize (2025); Ostrowski Prize (2025); Sadosky Prize (2026); Clay Research Award (2026); New Horizons in Mathematics Prize (2026); Fields Medal (2026)
- Scientific career
- Fields: Mathematics
- Workplaces: Institute for Advanced Study; University of California, Los Angeles; Courant Institute School of Mathematics, Computing, and Data Science; New York University; Institut des Hautes Études Scientifiques
- Thesis: A restriction estimate in $\mathbb{R}^3$ (2019)
- Doctoral advisor: Larry Guth
- Website: sites.google.com/view/hongwang/home

Hong Wang (Chinese: 王虹; pinyin: Wáng Hóng; born 1991) is a Chinese mathematician known for her research in Fourier analysis and geometric measure theory. She was awarded the Fields Medal in 2026 for her contributions to Fourier restriction, Falconer's conjecture, Furstenberg sets in the plane, and the Kakeya conjecture. She is the third woman and the first Chinese woman to win the award.

== Early life and education ==
Wang was born in Guilin, Guangxi, China, in 1991. Her parents were both schoolteachers at a local middle school, with her father being a mathematics teacher. At age 6, she developed an interest in incidence geometry. While in primary school, she skipped two grades. In 2004, Wang began attending Guilin High School. She was placed outside of the top 100 students in her first year of high school, but, by her final year, was ranked in the top ten of her class.

In 2007, at age 16, Wang took the Gaokao and won early admission to Peking University. At the time, the university reserved a single space for a mathematical sciences applicant from Guangxi, and Wang, whose score in the entrance exam was below the cutoff, was redirected to study earth science instead of mathematics. But in her sophomore year, after sitting the university's transfer exam, she switched her academic major to mathematics, focusing on algebraic analysis and mathematical analysis.

Wang graduated from Peking University with a Bachelor of Science degree in mathematics in 2011. Her classmates included Yunqing Tang and Yu Deng. She then pursued postgraduate studies in France and earned two graduate credentials in 2014: a Diplôme d'Ingénieur (lit. 'engineer's degree') from École polytechnique and a Master of Science degree from Paris-Sud University. In 2019, she earned her PhD degree in mathematics from the Massachusetts Institute of Technology (MIT). Her doctoral advisor was Larry Guth.

== Career ==
After completing her doctorate in 2019, Wang was a postdoctoral member of the Institute for Advanced Study in Princeton, New Jersey, from 2019 to 2021. She served as an assistant professor of mathematics at the University of California, Los Angeles from 2021 to 2023.

Wang moved to the Courant Institute of Mathematical Sciences at New York University (NYU) as an associate professor in 2023. In September 2025, she became a full professor at NYU, while also being appointed as a permanent professor of mathematics at the Institut des hautes études scientifiques (IHES) in France. In April 2026, NYU named Wang a Silver Professor of Mathematics, the most prestigious named professorship NYU can offer its faculty.

== Academic research ==
Wang's research is in harmonic analysis and geometric measure theory, particularly the family of Kakeya-type problems connecting Fourier analysis with incidence geometry, partial differential equations, combinatorics and number theory. As a doctoral student, she developed new approaches to the Fourier restriction problem using incidence geometry and contributed to work on the Falconer distance problem. In 2019, Wang, Larry Guth, and Ruixiang Zhang proved the two-dimensional case of the local smoothing conjecture. In 2023, Wang and Kevin Ren proved the two-dimensional Furstenberg set conjecture.

One of Wang's best-known research projects was conducted with Joshua Zahl on the three-dimensional Kakeya conjecture. In 2022, they proved the conjecture for a class known as sticky Kakeya sets, eliminating a major family of possible counterexamples. In February 2025, they posted a 127-page proof of the full conjecture in three dimensions, establishing that every Kakeya set in $\mathbb{R}^3$ has both Hausdorff and Minkowski dimension three.

The proof combined the earlier sticky-set analysis with a multiscale study of "grainy" configurations of thin tubes, iteratively improving known lower bounds until the full dimension was obtained. The result is considered foundational because Kakeya estimates are closely connected to major problems in harmonic analysis, including the Fourier restriction and local smoothing conjectures.

== Awards ==
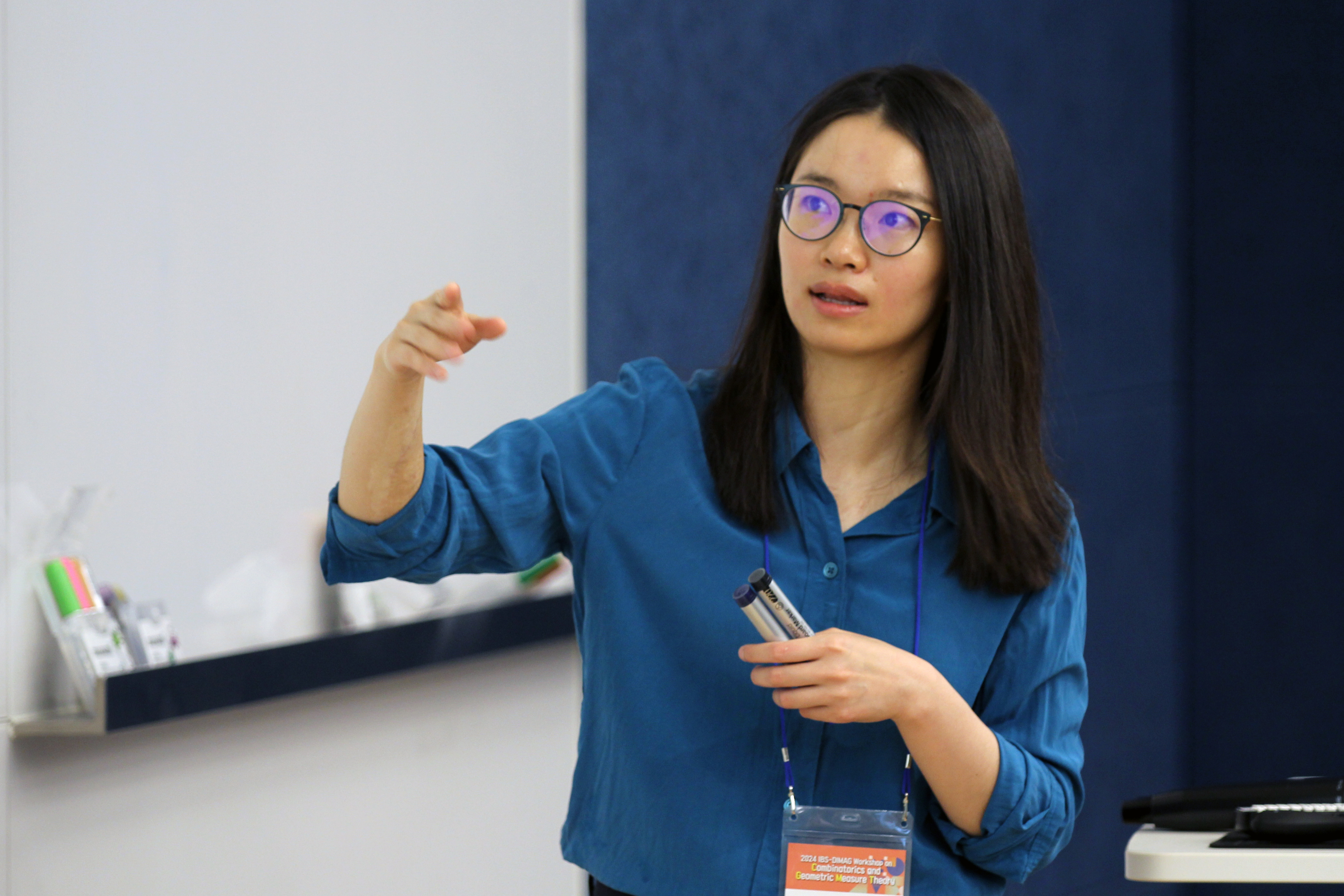
Wang in 2024

Wang was a 2022 recipient of the Maryam Mirzakhani New Frontiers Prize, given "for advances on the restriction conjecture, the local smoothing conjecture, and related problems".

Wang was a 2025 recipient of the Salem Prize, given "for her role in solutions to major open problems in harmonic analysis and geometric measure theory". She was awarded the 2025 ICCM Gold Medal of Mathematics from the International Consortium of Chinese Mathematicians, given to "outstanding mathematicians of Chinese descent under the age of 45 for their achievements in the research of pure and applied mathematics, and for their great contributions to the development of mathematics". She was also a 2025 recipient of the Ostrowski Prize, given for her "influential work in harmonic analysis, solving central problems in the field like the Kakeya set conjecture in three dimensions or the restriction conjecture in higher dimensions".

In 2026, she was awarded the Sadosky Prize from the Association for Women in Mathematics, given "for solving central problems in harmonic analysis through the introduction of ground-breaking ideas. In particular, for substantial contributions to the Fourier restriction problem, the Kakeya conjecture, and geometric measure theory". She also received the Clay Research Award, and was one of four mathematicians awarded the Fields Medal at ICM Philadelphia 2026.
