= The Erdős Distance Problem =

Geometry book

First edition

The Erdős Distance Problem is a monograph on the Erdős distinct distances problem in discrete geometry: how can one place $n$ points into $d$-dimensional Euclidean space so that the pairs of points make the smallest possible distance set? It was written by Julia Garibaldi, Alex Iosevich, and Steven Senger, and published in 2011 by the American Mathematical Society as volume 56 of the Student Mathematical Library. The Basic Library List Committee of the Mathematical Association of America has suggested its inclusion in undergraduate mathematics libraries.

== Topics ==
The Erdős Distance Problem consists of twelve chapters and three appendices.

After an introductory chapter describing the formulation of the problem by Paul Erdős and Erdős's proof that the number of distances is always at least proportional to $\sqrt[d]{n}$, the next six chapters cover the two-dimensional version of the problem. They build on each other to describe successive improvements to the known results on the problem, reaching a lower bound proportional to $n^{44/51}$ in Chapter 7. These results connect the problem to other topics including the Cauchy–Schwarz inequality, the crossing number inequality, the Szemerédi–Trotter theorem on incidences between points and lines, and methods from information theory.

Subsequent chapters discuss variations of the problem: higher dimensions, other metric spaces for the plane, the number of distinct inner products between vectors, and analogous problems in spaces whose coordinates come from a finite field instead of the real numbers.

== Audience and reception ==
Although the book is largely self-contained, it assumes a level of mathematical sophistication aimed at advanced university-level mathematics students. Exercises are included, making it possible to use it as a textbook for a specialized course. Reviewer Michael Weiss suggests that the book is less successful than its authors hoped at reaching "readers at different levels of mathematical experience": the density of some of its material, needed to cover that material thoroughly, is incompatible with accessibility to beginning mathematicians. Weiss also complains about some minor mathematical errors in the book, which however do not interfere with its overall content.

Much of the book's content, on the two-dimensional version of the problem, was made obsolete soon after its publication by new results of Larry Guth and Nets Katz, who proved that the number of distances in this case must be near-linear. Nevertheless, reviewer William Gasarch argues that this outcome should make the book more interesting to readers, not less, because it helps explain the barriers that Guth and Katz had to overcome in proving their result. Additionally, the techniques that the book describes have many uses in discrete geometry.
