= Local smoothing conjecture =

Conjecture in harmonic analysis

In harmonic analysis, the local smoothing conjecture is a conjecture about the behavior of solutions to the wave equation. The conjecture was first proposed by Christopher Sogge in 1991. It was proven in the dimension 2 case by Guth, Wang, and Zhang in 2019.

The local smoothing conjecture is the strongest in a sequence of conjectures in harmonic analysis. It implies the Bochner-Riesz conjecture, which in turn implies the restriction conjecture, which implies the Kakeya conjecture.

On October 26, 2026, OpenAI made an announcement claiming to have proved the local smoothing conjecture using a novel auxiliary partial differential equation. As of November 2026, the claim has not gone through academic review. Alex Iosevich, a researcher of harmonic analysis at the University of Rochester and a student of Sogge's, described the work as a "historic development".
