= Fields Medal =

Mathematics award

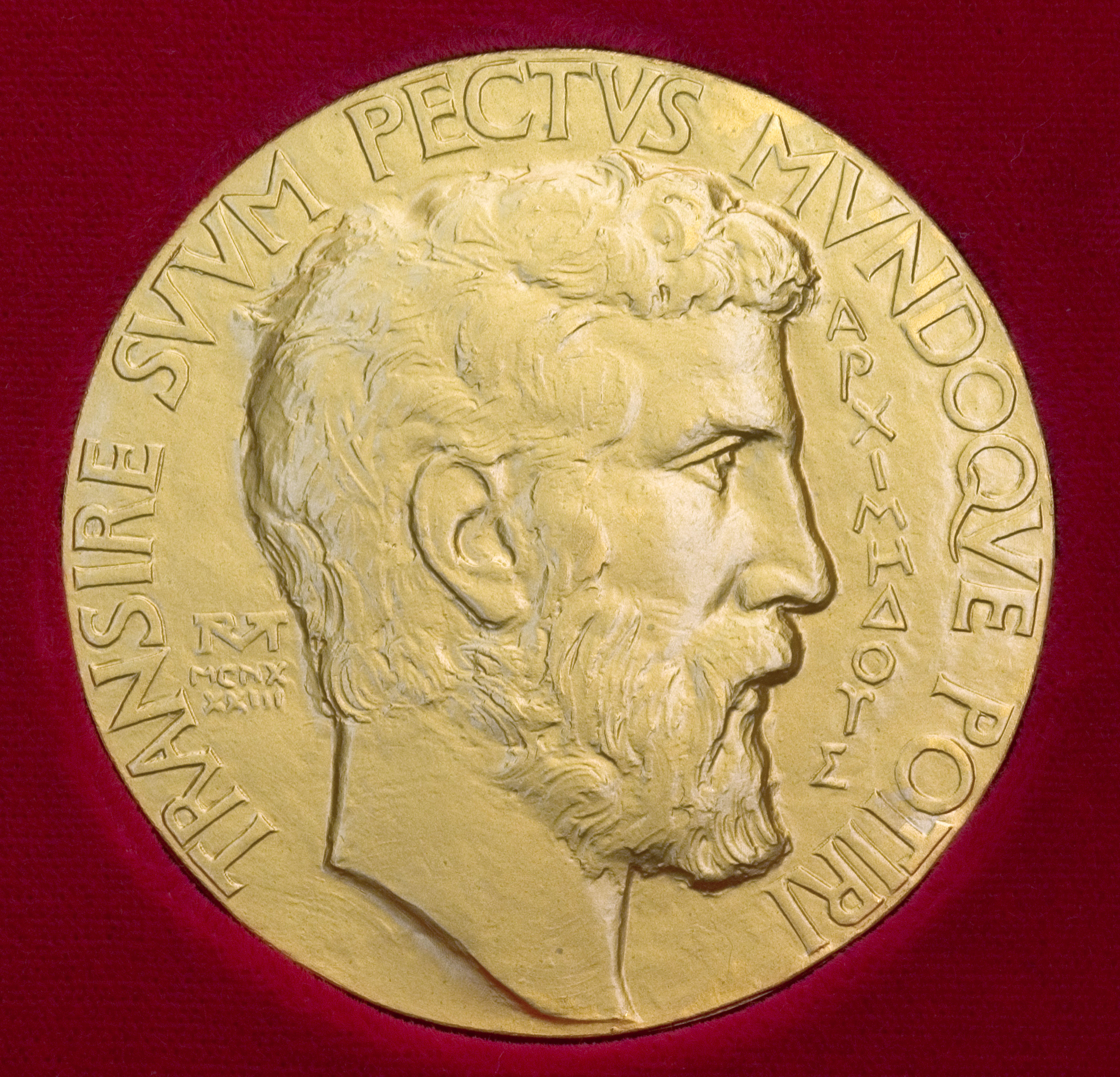
- Archimedes is featured on obverse
- Awarded for: Outstanding mathematicians under 40
- Presented by: International Mathematical Union
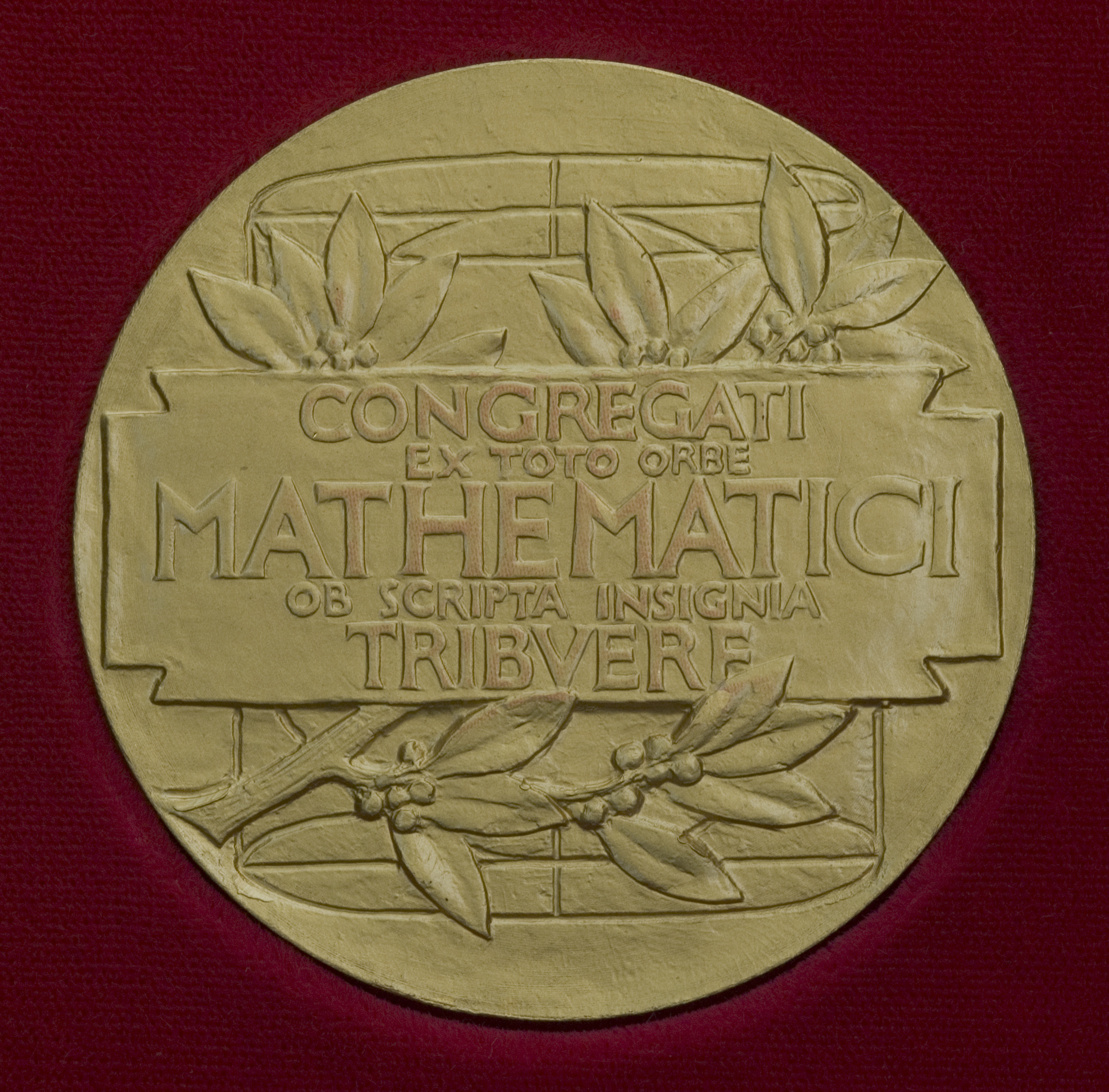
- Reverse
- Reward: CA$15,000
- First award: 1936; 90 years ago
- Website: mathunion.org/imu-awards/fields-medal

The Fields Medal is a prize awarded to two, three, or four mathematicians under 40 years of age at the International Congress of Mathematicians (ICM) of the International Mathematical Union (IMU), a convention which takes place every four years. The name of the award honors the Canadian mathematician John Charles Fields. Its purpose is to give recognition and support to younger mathematical researchers who have made major contributions to the field of mathematics.

The Fields Medal is regarded as one of the highest honors a mathematician can receive, according to the annual Academic Excellence Survey by ARWU, and has been described as the "Nobel Prize of Mathematics". In another reputation survey conducted by IREG in 2013–2014, the Fields Medal came closely after the Abel Prize, as the second most prestigious international award in mathematics.

The medal was first awarded in 1936 to Finnish mathematician Lars Ahlfors and American mathematician Jesse Douglas, and it has been awarded every four years since 1950. In 2014, the Iranian mathematician Maryam Mirzakhani became the first female Fields Medalist. With the exception of two Ph.D. holders in physics (Edward Witten and Martin Hairer), only people with a Ph.D. in mathematics have won the medal. In total, 68 people have been awarded the Fields Medal as of 2026. The most recent group of Fields Medalists received their awards on 23 July 2026, in Philadelphia.

Fields was instrumental in establishing the award, designing the medal himself and funding the monetary component, though he died before it was established and his plan was overseen by John Lighton Synge. The prize includes a monetary award which, since 2006, has been CA$15,000.

== Conditions of the award ==
The Fields Medal is widely regarded as one of the most prestigious awards in the field of mathematics and is often described as the "Nobel Prize of Mathematics". However, unlike the Nobel Prize, the Fields Medal is awarded once every four years and includes an age restriction: recipients must be under 40 years of age on 1 January of the year in which the medal is awarded.

The age limit reflects the intention of John Charles Fields that the award should not only recognize outstanding work already completed, but also encourage further achievement by the recipients and stimulate renewed effort among other mathematicians. In addition, an individual may receive the Fields Medal only once and is not eligible for future awards.

== List of Fields medalists ==
In certain years, the Fields medalists have been officially cited for particular mathematical achievements, while in other years such specificities have not been given. However, in every year that the medal has been awarded, noted mathematicians have lectured at the International Congress of Mathematicians (ICM) on each medalist's body of work. In the following table, official citations are quoted when possible (namely for the years 1958, 1998, and every year since 2006). For the other years through 1986, summaries of the ICM lectures, as written by Donald Albers, Gerald L. Alexanderson, and Constance Reid, are quoted. In the remaining years (1990, 1994, and 2002), part of the text of the ICM lecture itself has been quoted. The most recent awarding of the Fields Medal at the 2026 International Congress of the International Mathematical Union was in Philadelphia.

Year	ICM location	Medalists	Affiliation (when awarded)	Affiliation (current/last)	Reasons
1936	Oslo, Norway	Lars Ahlfors	University of Helsinki, Finland	Harvard University, US	"Awarded medal for research on covering surfaces related to Riemann surfaces of inverse functions of entire and meromorphic functions. Opened up new fields of analysis."
1936	Oslo, Norway	Jesse Douglas	Massachusetts Institute of Technology, US	City College of New York, US	"Did important work on the Plateau problem which is concerned with finding minimal surfaces connecting and determined by some fixed boundary."
1950	Cambridge, US	Laurent Schwartz	University of Nancy, France	University of Paris VII, France	"Developed the theory of distributions, a new notion of generalized function motivated by the Dirac delta-function of theoretical physics."
1950	Cambridge, US	Atle Selberg	Institute for Advanced Study, US		"Developed generalizations of the sieve methods of Viggo Brun; achieved major results on zeros of the Riemann zeta function; gave an elementary proof of the prime number theorem (with P. Erdős), with a generalization to prime numbers in an arbitrary arithmetic progression."
1954	Amsterdam, Netherlands	Kunihiko Kodaira	Princeton University, US Institute for Advanced Study, US University of Tokyo, Japan	University of Tokyo, Japan	"Achieved major results in the theory of harmonic integrals and numerous applications to Kählerian and more specifically to algebraic varieties. He demonstrated, by sheaf cohomology, that such varieties are Hodge manifolds."
1954	Amsterdam, Netherlands	Jean-Pierre Serre	University of Nancy, France	Collège de France, France	"Achieved major results on the homotopy groups of spheres, especially in his use of the method of spectral sequences. Reformulated and extended some of the main results of complex variable theory in terms of sheaves."
1958	Edinburgh, UK	Klaus Roth	Imperial College London, UK		"for solving a famous problem of number theory, namely, the determination of the exact exponent in the Thue-Siegel inequality"
1958	Edinburgh, UK	René Thom	University of Strasbourg, France	Institut des hautes études scientifiques, France	"for creating the theory of 'Cobordisme' which has, within the few years of its existence, led to the most penetrating insight into the topology of differentiable manifolds."
1962	Stockholm, Sweden	Lars Hörmander	Stockholm University, Sweden	Lund University, Sweden	"Worked in partial differential equations. Specifically, contributed to the general theory of linear differential operators. The questions go back to one of Hilbert's problems at the 1900 congress."
1962	Stockholm, Sweden	John Milnor	Princeton University, US	Stony Brook University, US	"Proved that a 7-dimensional sphere can have several differential structures; this led to the creation of the field of differential topology" (see exotic sphere).
1966	Moscow, USSR	Michael Atiyah	University of Oxford, UK	University of Edinburgh, UK	"Did joint work with Hirzebruch in K-theory; proved jointly with Singer the index theorem of elliptic operators on complex manifolds; worked in collaboration with Bott to prove a fixed point theorem related to the 'Lefschetz formula'."
1966	Moscow, USSR	Paul Cohen	Stanford University, US		"Used technique called "forcing" to prove the independence in set theory of the axiom of choice and of the generalized continuum hypothesis. The latter problem was the first of Hilbert's problems of the 1900 Congress."
1966	Moscow, USSR	Alexander Grothendieck	Institut des hautes études scientifiques, France	Centre National de la Recherche Scientifique, France	"Built on work of Weil and Zariski and effected fundamental advances in algebraic geometry. He introduced the idea of K-theory (the Grothendieck groups and rings). Revolutionized homological algebra in his celebrated 'Tôhoku paper'."
1966	Moscow, USSR	Stephen Smale	University of California, Berkeley, US	City University of Hong Kong, Hong Kong	"Worked in differential topology where he proved the generalized Poincaré conjecture in dimension $n \geq 5$: Every closed, n-dimensional manifold homotopy-equivalent to the n-dimensional sphere is homeomorphic to it. Introduced the method of handle-bodies to solve this and related problems."
1970	Nice, France	Alan Baker	University of Cambridge, UK	Trinity College, Cambridge, UK	"Generalized the Gelfond-Schneider theorem (the solution to Hilbert's seventh problem). From this work he generated transcendental numbers not previously identified."
1970	Nice, France	Heisuke Hironaka	Harvard University, US	Kyoto University, Japan	"Generalized work of Zariski who had proved for dimension ≤ 3 the theorem concerning the resolution of singularities on an algebraic variety. Hironaka proved the results in any dimension."
1970	Nice, France	Sergei Novikov	Moscow State University, USSR	Steklov Mathematical Institute, Russia Moscow State University, Russia University of Maryland-College Park, US	"Made important advances in topology, the most well-known being his proof of the topological invariance of the Pontryagin classes of the differentiable manifold. His work included a study of the cohomology and homotopy of Thom spaces."
1970	Nice, France	John G. Thompson	University of Cambridge, UK	University of Cambridge, UK University of Florida, US	"Proved jointly with W. Feit that all non-cyclic finite simple groups have even order. The extension of this work by Thompson determined the minimal simple finite groups, that is, the simple finite groups whose proper subgroups are solvable."
1974	Vancouver, Canada	Enrico Bombieri	University of Pisa, Italy	Institute for Advanced Study, US	"Major contributions in the primes, in univalent functions and the local Bieberbach conjecture, in theory of functions of several complex variables, and in theory of partial differential equations and minimal surfaces – in particular, to the solution of Bernstein's problem in higher dimensions."
1974	Vancouver, Canada	David Mumford	Harvard University, US	Brown University, US	"Contributed to problems of the existence and structure of varieties of moduli, varieties whose points parametrize isomorphism classes of some type of geometric object. Also made several important contributions to the theory of algebraic surfaces."
1978	Helsinki, Finland	Pierre Deligne	Institut des hautes études scientifiques, France	Institute for Advanced Study, US	"Gave solution of the three Weil conjectures concerning generalizations of the Riemann hypothesis to finite fields. His work did much to unify algebraic geometry and algebraic number theory."
1978	Helsinki, Finland	Charles Fefferman	Princeton University, US		"Contributed several innovations that revised the study of multidimensional complex analysis by finding correct generalizations of classical (low-dimensional) results."
1978	Helsinki, Finland	Grigory Margulis	Moscow State University, USSR	Yale University, US	"Provided innovative analysis of the structure of Lie groups. His work belongs to combinatorics, differential geometry, ergodic theory, dynamical systems, and Lie groups."
1978	Helsinki, Finland	Daniel Quillen	Massachusetts Institute of Technology, US	University of Oxford, UK	"The prime architect of the higher algebraic K-theory, a new tool that successfully employed geometric and topological methods and ideas to formulate and solve major problems in algebra, particularly ring theory and module theory."
1982	Warsaw, Poland	Alain Connes	Institut des hautes études scientifiques, France	Institut des hautes études scientifiques, France Collège de France, France Ohio State University, US	"Contributed to the theory of operator algebras, particularly the general classification and structure theorem of factors of type III, classification of automorphisms of the hyperfinite factor, classification of injective factors, and applications of the theory of C*-algebras to foliations and differential geometry in general."
1982	Warsaw, Poland	William Thurston	Princeton University, US	Cornell University, US	"Revolutionized study of topology in 2 and 3 dimensions, showing interplay between analysis, topology, and geometry. Contributed idea that a very large class of closed 3-manifolds carry a hyperbolic structure."
1982	Warsaw, Poland	Shing-Tung Yau	Institute for Advanced Study, US	Tsinghua University, China	"Made contributions in differential equations, also to the Calabi conjecture in algebraic geometry, to the positive mass conjecture of general relativity theory, and to real and complex Monge–Ampère equations."
1986	Berkeley, US	Simon Donaldson	University of Oxford, UK	Imperial College London, UK Stony Brook University, US	"Received medal primarily for his work on topology of four-manifolds, especially for showing that there is a differential structure on Euclidean four-space which is different from the usual structure."
1986	Berkeley, US	Gerd Faltings	Princeton University, US	Max Planck Institute for Mathematics, Germany	"Using methods of arithmetic algebraic geometry, he received medal primarily for his proof of the Mordell Conjecture."
1986	Berkeley, US	Michael Freedman	University of California, San Diego, US	Microsoft Station Q, US	"Developed new methods for topological analysis of four-manifolds. One of his results is a proof of the four-dimensional Poincaré Conjecture."
1990	Kyoto, Japan	Vladimir Drinfeld	B Verkin Institute for Low Temperature Physics and Engineering, USSR	University of Chicago, US	"Drinfeld's main preoccupation in the last decade [are] Langlands' program and quantum groups. In both domains, Drinfeld's work constituted a decisive breakthrough and prompted a wealth of research."
1990	Kyoto, Japan	Vaughan Jones	University of California, Berkeley, US	University of California, Berkeley, US Vanderbilt University, US	"Jones discovered an astonishing relationship between von Neumann algebras and geometric topology. As a result, he found a new polynomial invariant for knots and links in 3-space."
1990	Kyoto, Japan	Shigefumi Mori	Kyoto University, Japan		"The most profound and exciting development in algebraic geometry during the last decade or so was [...] Mori's Program in connection with the classification problems of algebraic varieties of dimension three." "Early in 1979, Mori brought to algebraic geometry a completely new excitement, that was his proof of Hartshorne's conjecture."
1990	Kyoto, Japan	Edward Witten	Institute for Advanced Study, US		"Time and again he has surprised the mathematical community by a brilliant application of physical insight leading to new and deep mathematical theorems."
1994	Zürich, Switzerland	Jean Bourgain	Institut des hautes études scientifiques, France University of Illinois Urbana-Champaign, US	Institute for Advanced Study, US	"Bourgain's work touches on several central topics of mathematical analysis: the geometry of Banach spaces, convexity in high dimensions, harmonic analysis, ergodic theory, and finally, nonlinear partial differential equations from mathematical physics."
1994	Zürich, Switzerland	Pierre-Louis Lions	University of Paris 9, France	Collège de France, France École polytechnique, France	"His contributions cover a variety of areas, from probability theory to partial differential equations (PDEs). Within the PDE area he has done several beautiful things in nonlinear equations. The choice of his problems have always been motivated by applications."
1994	Zürich, Switzerland	Jean-Christophe Yoccoz	Paris-Sud 11 University, France	Collège de France, France	"Yoccoz obtained a very enlightening proof of Bruno's theorem, and he was able to prove the converse [...] Palis and Yoccoz obtained a complete system of C^{∞} conjugation invariants for Morse-Smale diffeomorphisms."
1994	Zürich, Switzerland	Efim Zelmanov	University of Wisconsin-Madison University of Chicago, US	Steklov Mathematical Institute, Russia, University of California, San Diego, US	"For the solution of the restricted Burnside problem."
1998	Berlin, Germany	Richard Borcherds	University of California, Berkeley, US University of Cambridge, UK	University of California, Berkeley, US	"For his contributions to algebra, the theory of automorphic forms, and mathematical physics, including the introduction of vertex algebras and Borcherds' Lie algebras, the proof of the Conway–Norton moonshine conjecture and the discovery of a new class of automorphic infinite products."
1998	Berlin, Germany	Timothy Gowers	University of Cambridge, UK		"For his contributions to functional analysis and combinatorics, developing a new vision of infinite-dimensional geometry, including the solution of two of Banach's problems and the discovery of the so called Gowers' dichotomy: every infinite dimensional Banach space contains either a subspace with many symmetries (technically, with an unconditional basis) or a subspace every operator on which is Fredholm of index zero."
1998	Berlin, Germany	Maxim Kontsevich	Institut des hautes études scientifiques, France Rutgers University, US		"For his contributions to algebraic geometry, topology, and mathematical physics, including the proof of Witten's conjecture of intersection numbers in moduli spaces of stable curves, construction of the universal Vassiliev invariant of knots, and formal quantization of Poisson manifolds."
1998	Berlin, Germany	Curtis T. McMullen	Harvard University, US		"For his contributions to the theory of holomorphic dynamics and geometrization of three-manifolds, including proofs of Bers' conjecture on the density of cusp points in the boundary of the Teichmüller space, and Kra's theta-function conjecture."
2002	Beijing, China	Laurent Lafforgue	Institut des hautes études scientifiques, France		"Laurent Lafforgue has been awarded the Fields Medal for his proof of the Langlands correspondence for the full linear groups GLr (r≥1) over function fields of positive characteristic."
2002	Beijing, China	Vladimir Voevodsky	Institute for Advanced Study, US		"He defined and developed motivic cohomology and the A1-homotopy theory, provided a framework for describing many new cohomology theories for algebraic varieties; he proved the Milnor conjectures on the K-theory of fields."
2006	Madrid, Spain	Andrei Okounkov	Princeton University, US	Columbia University, US University of California, Berkeley, US	"For his contributions bridging probability, representation theory and algebraic geometry."
2006	Madrid, Spain	Grigori Perelman (declined)	None	St. Petersburg Department of Steklov Institute of Mathematics of Russian Academy of Sciences, Russia	"For his contributions to geometry and his revolutionary insights into the analytical and geometric structure of the Ricci flow."
2006	Madrid, Spain	Terence Tao	University of California, Los Angeles, US		"For his contributions to partial differential equations, combinatorics, harmonic analysis and additive number theory."
2006	Madrid, Spain	Wendelin Werner	Paris-Sud 11 University, France	ETH Zurich, Switzerland	"For his contributions to the development of stochastic Loewner evolution, the geometry of two-dimensional Brownian motion, and conformal field theory."
2010	Hyderabad, India	Elon Lindenstrauss	Hebrew University of Jerusalem, Israel Princeton University, US	Hebrew University of Jerusalem, Israel	"For his results on measure rigidity in ergodic theory, and their applications to number theory."
2010	Hyderabad, India	Ngô Bảo Châu	Paris-Sud 11 University, France Institute for Advanced Study, US	University of Chicago, US Institute for Advanced Study, US	"For his proof of the Fundamental Lemma in the theory of automorphic forms through the introduction of new algebro-geometric methods."
2010	Hyderabad, India	Stanislav Smirnov	University of Geneva, Switzerland	University of Geneva, Switzerland St. Petersburg State University, Russia	"For the proof of conformal invariance of percolation and the planar Ising model in statistical physics."
2010	Hyderabad, India	Cédric Villani	École Normale Supérieure de Lyon, France Institut Henri Poincaré, France	Lyon University, France Institut Henri Poincaré, France	"For his proofs of nonlinear Landau damping and convergence to equilibrium for the Boltzmann equation."
2014	Seoul, South Korea	Artur Avila	University of Paris VII, France CNRS, France Instituto Nacional de Matemática Pura e Aplicada, Brazil	University of Zurich, Switzerland Instituto Nacional de Matemática Pura e Aplicada, Brazil	"For his profound contributions to dynamical systems theory, which have changed the face of the field, using the powerful idea of renormalization as a unifying principle."
2014	Seoul, South Korea	Manjul Bhargava	Princeton University, US		"For developing powerful new methods in the geometry of numbers, which he applied to count rings of small rank and to bound the average rank of elliptic curves."
2014	Seoul, South Korea	Martin Hairer	University of Warwick, UK	École Polytechnique Fédérale de Lausanne, Switzerland Imperial College London, UK	"For his outstanding contributions to the theory of stochastic partial differential equations, and in particular for the creation of a theory of regularity structures for such equations."
2014	Seoul, South Korea	Maryam Mirzakhani	Stanford University, US		"For her outstanding contributions to the dynamics and geometry of Riemann surfaces and their moduli spaces."
2018	Rio de Janeiro, Brazil	Caucher Birkar	University of Cambridge, UK	Tsinghua University, China	"For the proof of the boundedness of Fano varieties and for contributions to the minimal model program."
2018	Rio de Janeiro, Brazil	Alessio Figalli	Swiss Federal Institute of Technology Zurich, Switzerland		"For contributions to the theory of optimal transport and its applications in partial differential equations, metric geometry and probability."
2018	Rio de Janeiro, Brazil	Peter Scholze	University of Bonn, Germany		"For having transformed arithmetic algebraic geometry over p-adic fields."
2018	Rio de Janeiro, Brazil	Akshay Venkatesh	Stanford University, US	Institute for Advanced Study, US	"For his synthesis of analytic number theory, homogeneous dynamics, topology, and representation theory, which has resolved long-standing problems in areas such as the equidistribution of arithmetic objects."
2022	Helsinki, Finland (Note: ICM 2022 was originally planned to be held in Saint Petersburg, Russia, but was moved online following the 2022 Russian invasion of Ukraine. The award ceremony for the Fields Medals and prize winner lectures took place in Helsinki, Finland and were live-streamed.)	Hugo Duminil-Copin	Institut des hautes études scientifiques, France University of Geneva, Switzerland		"For solving longstanding problems in the probabilistic theory of phase transitions in statistical physics, especially in dimensions three and four."
2022	Helsinki, Finland	June Huh	Princeton University, US		"For bringing the ideas of Hodge theory to combinatorics, the proof of the Dowling–Wilson conjecture for geometric lattices, the proof of the Heron–Rota–Welsh conjecture for matroids, the development of the theory of Lorentzian polynomials, and the proof of the strong Mason conjecture."
2022	Helsinki, Finland	James Maynard	University of Oxford, UK		"For contributions to analytic number theory, which have led to major advances in the understanding of the structure of prime numbers and in Diophantine approximation."
2022	Helsinki, Finland	Maryna Viazovska	École Polytechnique Fédérale de Lausanne, Switzerland		"For the proof that the $E_8$ lattice provides the densest packing of identical spheres in 8 dimensions, and further contributions to related extremal problems and interpolation problems in Fourier analysis."
2026	Philadelphia, US	Yu Deng	University of Chicago, US		"For his work in partial differential equations, including the rigorous derivation of the Boltzmann equation from hard-sphere dynamics for rarefied gases, the derivation of wave kinetic equations from nonlinear dispersive systems, and probabilistic approaches to nonlinear Schrödinger dynamics."
2026	Philadelphia, US	John Pardon	Stony Brook University, US		"For his achievements in symplectic geometry including new approaches to virtual fundamental cycles, Fukaya categories of certain manifolds and counting holomorphic curves, and for his contributions to other areas of geometry and topology, including group actions on 3-manifolds and knot theory."
2026	Philadelphia, US	Jacob Tsimerman	University of Toronto, Canada		"For his contribution in the recasting of o-minimality as a fundamental method of arithmetic and complex algebraic geometry, and his role in the proof of many central conjectures including Griffiths' conjecture on the algebraicity of images of the period maps, and the Andre-Oort conjecture for Siegel modular varieties."
2026	Philadelphia, US	Hong Wang	New York University, US Institut des hautes études scientifiques, France		"For her work in harmonic analysis and geometric measure theory, including applications of multiscale and decoupling techniques to the local smoothing conjecture for the planar wave equation, and major advances in Fourier restriction, Falconer distance sets, Furstenberg sets in the plane, and the Kakeya problem in three dimensions."

== Landmarks ==
The medal was first awarded in 1936 to the Finnish mathematician Lars Ahlfors and the American mathematician Jesse Douglas.

In 1954, Jean-Pierre Serre became the youngest winner of the Fields Medal, at 27. He retains this distinction.

In 1966, Alexander Grothendieck boycotted the ICM, held in Moscow, to protest against Soviet military actions taking place in Eastern Europe. Léon Motchane, founder and director of the Institut des hautes études scientifiques, attended and accepted Grothendieck's Fields Medal on his behalf.

In 1970, Sergei Novikov, because of restrictions placed on him by the Soviet government, was unable to travel to the congress in Nice to receive his medal.

In 1978, Grigory Margulis, because of restrictions placed on him by the Soviet government, was unable to travel to the congress in Helsinki to receive his medal. The award was accepted on his behalf by Jacques Tits, who said in his address: "I cannot but express my deep disappointment—no doubt shared by many people here—in the absence of Margulis from this ceremony. In view of the symbolic meaning of this city of Helsinki, I had indeed grounds to hope that I would have a chance at last to meet a mathematician whom I know only through his work and for whom I have the greatest respect and admiration."

In 1982, the congress was due to be held in Warsaw but had to be rescheduled to the next year, because of martial law introduced in Poland on 13 December 1981. The awards were announced at the ninth General Assembly of the IMU earlier in the year and awarded at the 1983 Warsaw congress.

In 1990, Edward Witten became the first physicist to win the award.

In 1998, at the ICM, Andrew Wiles was presented by the chair of the Fields Medal Committee, Yuri I. Manin, with the first-ever IMU silver plaque in recognition of his proof of Fermat's Last Theorem. Don Zagier referred to the plaque as a "quantized Fields Medal". Accounts of this award frequently make reference that at the time of the award Wiles was over the age limit for the Fields medal. Although Wiles was slightly over the age limit in 1994, he was thought to be a favorite to win the medal; however, a gap (later resolved by Taylor and Wiles) in the proof was found in 1993.

In 2006, Grigori Perelman, who proved the Poincaré conjecture, refused his Fields Medal, stating "I'm not interested in money or fame; I don't want to be on display like an animal in a zoo." He did not attend the congress.

In 2014, Maryam Mirzakhani became the first Iranian as well as the first woman to win the Fields Medal, Artur Avila became the first South American, and Manjul Bhargava became the first person of Indian origin to do so.

== Medal ==
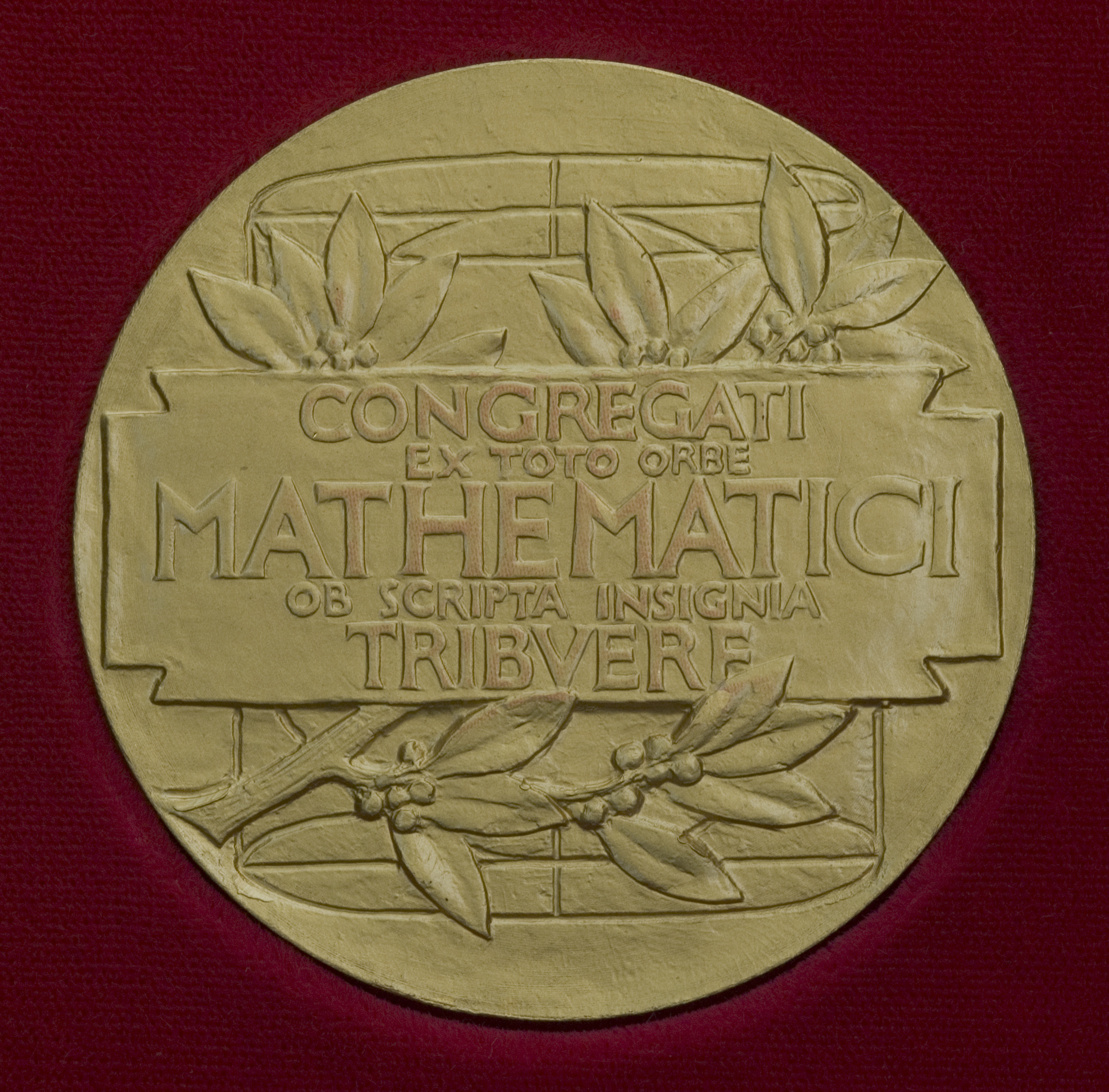
The reverse of the Fields Medal

The medal was designed by the Canadian sculptor R. Tait McKenzie. It is made of 14KT gold, has a diameter of 63.5mm, and weighs 169g.

- On the obverse is Archimedes and a quote attributed to 1st century AD poet Manilius, which reads in Latin: Transire suum pectus mundoque potiri ("To surpass one's understanding and master the world"). The year number 1933 is written in Roman numerals and contains an error (MCNXXXIII rather than MCMXXXIII). In capital Greek letters the word Ἀρχιμηδους, or "of Archimedes," is inscribed.
- On the reverse is the inscription:

Congregati
ex toto orbe
mathematici
ob scripta insignia
tribuere

Translation: "Mathematicians gathered from the entire world have awarded [understood but not written: 'this prize'] for outstanding writings."

In the background, there is the representation of Archimedes' tomb, with the carving illustrating his theorem On the Sphere and Cylinder, behind an olive branch. (This is the mathematical result of which Archimedes was reportedly most proud: Given a sphere and a circumscribed cylinder of the same height and diameter, the ratio between their volumes is equal to 2/3.)

The rim bears the name of the prizewinner.

== Female recipients ==
The Fields Medal has had three female recipients: Maryam Mirzakhani from Iran in 2014, Maryna Viazovska from Ukraine in 2022, and Hong Wang from China in 2026.

== In popular culture ==
The Fields Medal gained some recognition in popular culture due to references in the 1997 film Good Will Hunting. In the movie, Gerald Lambeau (Stellan Skarsgård) is an MIT professor who won the award prior to the events of the story. Throughout the film, references made to the award are meant to convey its prestige in the field. In the 2005–2010 TV series Numbers, the leading character, mathematics professor Charlie Eppes, is portrayed as a Fields nominee. The series also references the popular myth concerning the absence of a Nobel Prize in mathematics, with a character jokingly claiming it was excluded because of a mathematician's romantic prowess with Alfred Nobel's fiancée.

== See also ==
- Abel Prize
- Kyoto Prize
- List of prizes known as the Nobel or the highest honors of a field
- List of mathematics awards
- IMU Abacus Medal
- Rolf Schock Prizes
- Turing Award
- Wolf Prize in Mathematics
