= Kakeya =

Kakeya may refer to:

- Kakeya, Shimane town
- Sōichi Kakeya, mathematician
- Kakeya set in mathematics
