= Distance set =

Set of distances defined from a set of points

In geometry, the distance set of a collection of points is the set of distances between distinct pairs of points. Thus, it can be seen as the generalization of a difference set, the set of distances (and their negations) in collections of numbers.

Several problems and results in geometry concern distance sets, usually based on the principle that a large collection of points must have a large distance set (for varying definitions of "large"):

- Falconer's conjecture is the statement that, for a collection of points in $d$-dimensional space that has Hausdorff dimension larger than $d/2$, the corresponding distance set has nonzero Lebesgue measure. Although partial results are known, the conjecture remains unproven.
- The Erdős–Ulam problem asks whether it is possible to have a dense set in the Euclidean plane whose distance set consists only of rational numbers. Again, it remains unsolved.
- Fermat's theorem on sums of two squares characterizes the numbers in the distance set of the two-dimensional integer lattice: they are the square roots of integers whose prime factorization does not contain an odd number of copies of any prime congruent to 3 mod 4. Analogously, Legendre's three-square theorem characterizes the distance set of the three-dimensional integer lattice, and Lagrange's four-square theorem characterizes the distance set of integer lattices in four and higher dimensions as being the square roots of integers without any additional constraints. In lattices of five or more dimensions, every subset of the lattice with nonzero upper density has a distance set containing the squares of an infinite arithmetic progression.
- According to the Erdős–Anning theorem, every infinite set of points in the Euclidean plane that does not lie on one line has a non-integer in its distance set.
- Square grids of points have distance sets of sublinear size, in contrast to points in general position whose distance set is quadratic in size. However, according to the 2015 solution of the Erdős distinct distances problem by Larry Guth and Nets Katz, the distance set of any finite collection of points in the Euclidean plane is only slightly sublinear, nearly as large as the given collection. In particular, only a finite collection of points can have a finite distance set.
- A Golomb ruler is a finite set of points on a line such that no two pairs of points have the same distance. Sophie Piccard claimed that no two Golomb rulers have the same distance sets. The claim is incorrect, but there is only one counterexample, a pair of six-point Golomb rulers with a shared distance set.
- The equilateral dimension of a metric space is the largest size of a collection of points whose distance set has only a single element. Kusner's conjecture states that the equilateral dimension of a $d$-dimensional space with the Manhattan distance is exactly $2d$, but this remains unproven.
- A 2-distance set is a set of points for which the set of distinct mutual distances has cardinality exactly 2. An example of a 2-distance set is the set of vertices of the regular octahedron. There are various results about 2-distance sets, including a classification of all 2-distance sets in dimension 4. Every 2-distance set is an isosceles set, a set in which all triangles are isosceles. As a partial converse, every isosceles set that cannot be decomposed into two perpendicular subspaces is a 2-distance set.
- The Universal chord theorem states that for any real function, the distance set of the level sets of the function is closed under division by integers.

Distance sets have also been used as a shape descriptor in computer vision.

== See also ==
- Distance matrix
