= Izabella Łaba =

Polish-Canadian mathematician

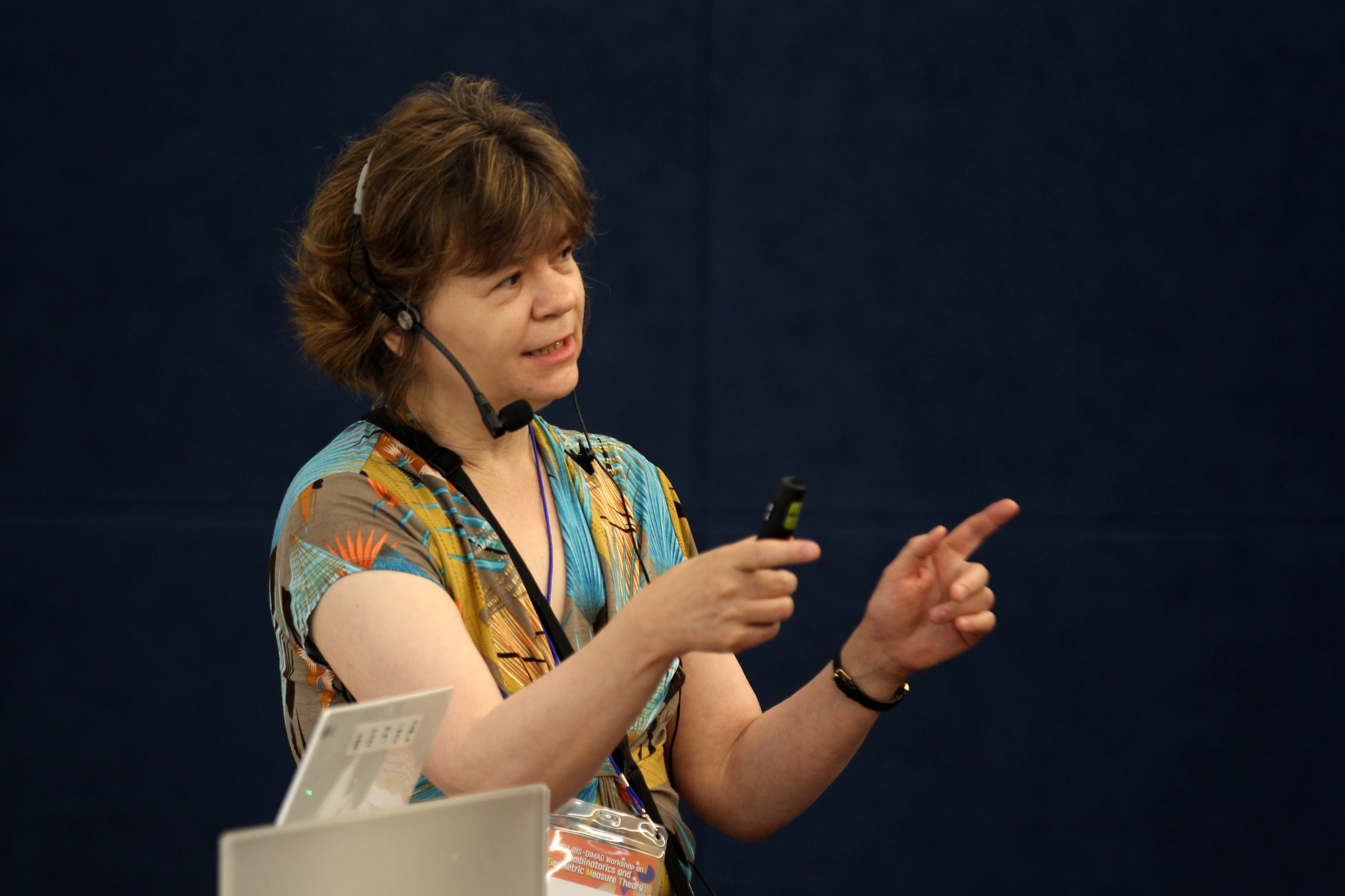
- Born: 1966 (age 59–60)
- Education: University of Toronto
- Known for: Harmonic Analysis, Geometric Measure Theory, Additive Combinatorics
- Awards: Coxeter-James Prize (2004); Krieger-Nelson Prize (2008)
- Scientific career
- Fields: Mathematics
- Workplaces: University of British Columbia
- Website: Website

Izabella Łaba (born 1966) is a Polish-Canadian mathematician, a professor of mathematics at the University of British Columbia. Her main research specialties are harmonic analysis, geometric measure theory, and additive combinatorics.

== Professional career ==
Łaba earned a master's degree in 1986 from the University of Wrocław. She received her PhD from the University of Toronto in 1994, under the supervision of Israel Michael Sigal, after which she was a postdoctoral scholar at University of California, Los Angeles and then an assistant professor at Princeton University before moving to UBC in 2000.

She is one of three founding editors of the Online Journal of Analytic Combinatorics.

== Contributions ==
Łaba's thesis research proved the asymptotic completeness of many n-body systems in the presence of a constant magnetic field. While at UCLA, with Nets Katz and Terence Tao, she made important contributions to the theory of Kakeya sets, including the best known lower bound on these sets in three-dimensional Euclidean spaces. Her more recent work concerns harmonic analysis, periodic tilings, and Falconer's conjecture on sets of distances of points.

== Awards and honours ==
Łaba was the 2004 winner of the Coxeter–James Prize, an annual prize of the Canadian Mathematical Society for outstanding young mathematicians. In 2008, the CMS honoured her again with their Krieger–Nelson Prize, given to an outstanding woman in mathematics.

In 2012 she became a fellow of the American Mathematical Society, and in 2016 she was the Etta Z. Falconer lecturer for the Association for Women in Mathematics.
