= Varjú =

Varjú is a surname. Notable people with the surname include:

- Péter Varjú (born 1982), Hungarian mathematician
- Vilmos Varjú (1937–1994), Hungarian shot putter
- László Varju (born 1961), Hungarian politician
- Benedek Varju (born 2001), Hungarian footballer
