= Hallard Croft =

English mathematician (1936–2025)

- Born: 15 April 1936; Bromley, England
- Died: 15 September 2025 (aged 89)
- Education: Peterhouse, Cambridge
- Scientific career
- Fields: Mathematics
- Workplaces: University of Cambridge
- Doctoral advisor: John Edensor Littlewood

Hallard Thomas Croft (15 April 1936 – 15 September 2025) was an English mathematician.

== Life and career ==
Born in Bromley, he was educated at City of London School and earned a PhD from the University of Cambridge in 1961, under John Edensor Littlewood's supervision. A fellow of Peterhouse, Cambridge, from 1963 to 2003, in 1967 he invented a geometric shape called Croft's Tortoise and in 1991 he co-authored Unsolved Problems in Geometry with Kenneth Falconer and Richard K. Guy.

Croft clashed with Hugh Trevor-Roper after the latter became Master of Peterhouse in 1980 when Croft was Director of Studies in mathematics and Senior Fellow; Croft's conservatism led him to deeply dislike Trevor-Roper, and the upshot was that he was re-elected as a Fellow in 1983 without his seniority. Friends suggested that Trevor-Roper disliked Croft because of his homosexuality.
