= Vinogradov's mean-value theorem =

Theorem in analytic number theory

In mathematics, Vinogradov's mean value theorem is an estimate for the number of equal sums of powers. It is an important inequality in analytic number theory, named for I. M. Vinogradov.

More specifically, let $J_{s,k}(X)$ count the number of solutions to the system of $k$ simultaneous Diophantine equations in $2s$ variables given by

$$x_1^j+x_2^j+\cdots+x_s^j=y_1^j+y_2^j+\cdots+y_s^j\quad (1\le j\le k)$$

with

$$1\le x_i,y_i\le X, (1\le i\le s)$$.

That is, it counts the number of equal sums of powers with equal numbers of terms ($s$) and equal exponents ($j$), up to $k$th powers and up to powers of $X$. An alternative analytic expression for $J_{s,k}(X)$ is

$$J_{s,k}(X)=\int_{[0,1)^k}|f_k(\mathbf\alpha;X)|^{2s}d\mathbf\alpha$$

where

$$f_k(\mathbf\alpha;X)=\sum_{1\le x\le X}\exp(2\pi i(\alpha_1x+\cdots+\alpha_kx^k)).$$

Vinogradov's mean-value theorem gives an upper bound on the value of $J_{s,k}(X)$.

A strong estimate for $J_{s,k}(X)$ is an important part of the Hardy-Littlewood method for attacking Waring's problem and also for demonstrating a zero free region for the Riemann zeta-function in the critical strip. Various bounds have been produced for $J_{s,k}(X)$, valid for different relative ranges of $s$ and $k$. The classical form of the theorem applies when $s$ is very large in terms of $k$.

An analysis of the proofs of the Vinogradov mean-value conjecture can be found in the Bourbaki Séminaire talk by Lillian Pierce.

== Lower bounds ==
By considering the $X^s$ solutions where

$$x_i=y_i, (1\le i\le s)$$

one can see that $J_{s,k}(X)\gg X^s$.

A more careful analysis (see Vaughan equation 7.4) provides the lower bound

$$J_{s,k}\gg X^s+X^{2s-\frac12k(k+1)}.$$

== Proof of the Main conjecture ==
The main conjecture of Vinogradov's mean value theorem was that the upper bound is close to this lower bound. More specifically that for any $\epsilon>0$ we have

$$J_{s,k}(X)\ll X^{s+\epsilon}+X^{2s-\frac12k(k+1)+\epsilon}.$$

This was proved by Jean Bourgain, Ciprian Demeter, and Larry Guth and by a different method by Trevor Wooley.

If

$$s\ge \frac12k(k+1)$$

this is equivalent to the bound

$$J_{s,k}(X)\ll X^{2s-\frac12k(k+1)+\epsilon}.$$

Similarly if $s\le \frac12k(k+1)$ the conjectural form is equivalent to the bound

$$J_{s,k}(X)\ll X^{s+\epsilon}.$$

Stronger forms of the theorem lead to an asymptotic expression for $J_{s,k}$, in particular for large $s$ relative to $k$ the expression

$$J_{s,k}\sim \mathcal C(s,k)X^{2s-\frac12k(k+1)},$$

where $\mathcal C(s,k)$ is a fixed positive number depending on at most $s$ and $k$, holds, see Theorem 1.2 in.

== History ==
Vinogradov's original theorem of 1935 showed that for fixed $s,k$ with

$$s\ge k^2\log (k^2+k)+\frac14k^2+\frac54 k+1$$

there exists a positive constant $D(s,k)$ such that

$$J_{s,k}(X)\le D(s,k)(\log X)^{2s}X^{2s-\frac12k(k+1)+\frac12}.$$

Although this was a ground-breaking result, it falls short of the full conjectured form. Instead it demonstrates the conjectured form when

$\epsilon>\frac12$.

Vinogradov's approach was improved upon by Karatsuba and Stechkin who showed that for $s\ge k$ there exists a positive constant $D(s,k)$ such that

$$J_{s,k}(X)\le D(s,k)X^{2s-\frac12k(k+1)+\eta_{s,k}},$$

where

$$\eta_{s,k}=\frac12 k^2\left(1-\frac1k\right)^{\left[\frac sk\right]}\le k^2e^{-s/k^2}.$$

Noting that for

$$s>k^2(2\log k-\log\epsilon)$$

we have

$$\eta_{s,k}<\epsilon$$,

this proves that the conjectural form holds for $s$ of this size.

The method can be sharpened further to prove the asymptotic estimate

$$J_{s,k}\sim \mathcal C(s,k)X^{2s-\frac12k(k+1)},$$

for large $s$ in terms of $k$.

In 2012 Wooley improved the range of $s$ for which the conjectural form holds. He proved that for

$k\ge 2$ and $s\ge k(k+1)$

and for any $\epsilon>0$ we have

$$J_{s,k}(X)\ll X^{2s-\frac12k(k+1)+\epsilon}.$$

Ford and Wooley have shown that the conjectural form is established for small $s$ in terms of $k$. Specifically they show that for

$$k\ge 4$$

and

$$1\le s\le \frac14(k+1)^2$$

for any $\epsilon>0$

we have

$$J_{s,k}(X)\ll X^{s+\epsilon}.$$
