= Freddy Delbaen =

Belgian-Swiss financial mathematician

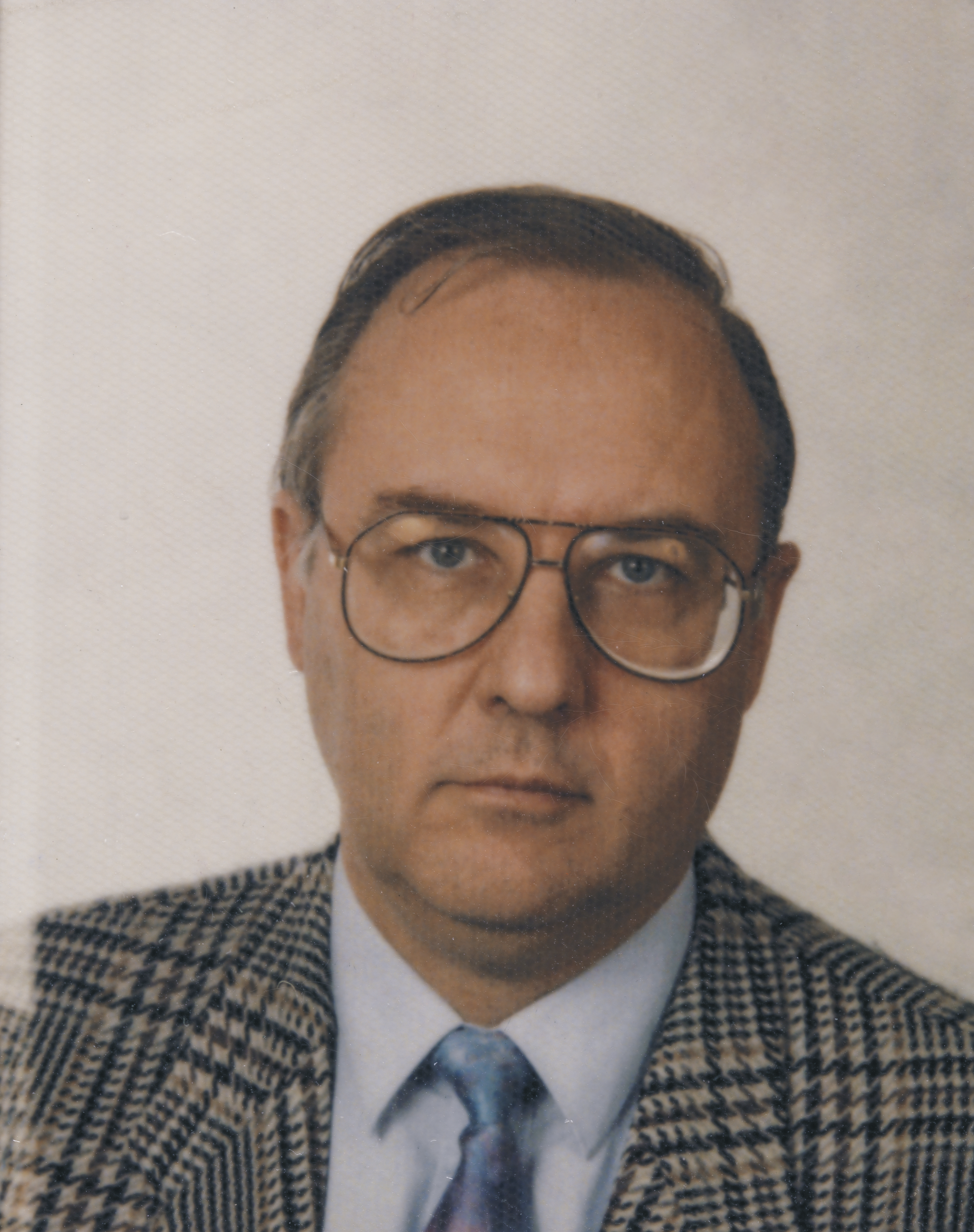
- Born: 21 November 1946 (age 79); Duffel, Belgium
- Occupation: Financial mathematician

Academic background
- Education: Vrije Universiteit Brussel
- Doctoral advisor: Lucien Waelbroeck

Academic work
- Institutions: Free University of Brussels; University of Antwerp; ETH Zurich
- Doctoral students: Jean Bourgain

Freddy Delbaen (born 21 November 1946 in Duffel, Belgium) is a Belgian-Swiss mathematician. He is professor emeritus of financial mathematics at ETH Zurich.

Delbaen made fundamental contributions to the mathematical theory of arbitrage including proving, together with Walter Schachermayer, a general version of the fundamental theorem of asset pricing. He also introduced in a jointly written paper the notion of the risk measure.

His research includes topics in financial mathematics, probability theory, functional analysis and actuarial mathematics.

== Life ==
Delbaen was born in 1946 in Duffel in the province of Antwerp. He studied mathematics at the Free University of Brussels and received his doctorate there in 1971 under the supervision of Lucien Waelbroeck.

From 1971 to 1995 he was a professor at the Free University of Brussels and at the University of Antwerp. In 1995, Delbaen became a full professor at the ETH Zurich, remaining there until his retirement in 2008. He is still a professor emeritus at ETH and, since 2011, also a guest lecturer at the University of Zurich.

Delbaen is a Fellow of the Institute of Mathematical Statistics since 2011 and the American Mathematical Society since 2013. He is also a member of Academia Europaea since 2020.

== Research ==
Together with Walter Schachermayer, he proved a general form of the fundamental theorem of asset pricing for (locally) bounded semimartingales, replacing the condition of "no arbitrage" with the term no free lunch with vanishing risk (NFLVR). The two also proved a version for unbounded price processes.

In a joint paper with P. Artzner, J. M. Eber and D. Heath, he introduced the concept of (coherent) risk measure on a finite probability space. Delbaen later generalized the concept to general probability spaces.

== Selected publications ==
- J. Bourgain; F. Delbaen (1980). "A class of special $L^{\infty}$ spaces". Acta Mathematica. 145: 155–176. doi:10.1007/BF02414188. S2CID 126103660.
- Delbaen, Freddy; Schachermayer, Walter (1994). "A General Version of the Fundamental Theorem of Asset Pricing". Mathematische Annalen. 300 (1): 463–520. doi:10.1007/BF01450498.
- Delbaen, Freddy; Schachermayer, Walter (1995). "The existence of absolutely continuous local martingale measures". The Annals of Applied Probability. Institute of Mathematical Statistics: 926–945.
- Delbaen, Freddy; Arztner, Philippe; Eber, Jean-Marc; Heath, David (1997). "Coherent Risk Measures". Mathematical Finance. 3 (3): 203–228.
- Delbaen, Freddy; Schachermayer, Walter (1999). "The fundamental theorem of asset pricing for unbounded stochastic processes". Mathematische Annalen. 20 (2). doi:10.1016/S0167-6687(97)80683-X.
- Bruss, Franz T.; Delbaen, Freddy (2001). "Optimal Rules for the Sequential Selection of Monotone Subsequences of Maximum Length". Stochastic Processes and Their Applications. 96: 313–342. doi:10.1016/S0304-4149(01)00122-3.
- Freddy Delbaen (2002). "Coherent risk measures on general probability spaces". Advances in Finance and Stochastics. Springer: 1–37.

=== Books ===
- Monetary Utility Functions (2012). Finance and Insurance, Osaka University Lecture Notes Series. ISBN 4872592786
- with Walter Schachermayer: The Mathematics of Arbitrage (2005). Springer Finance
