= Gyula Pál =

Hungarian-Danish mathematician (1881–1946)

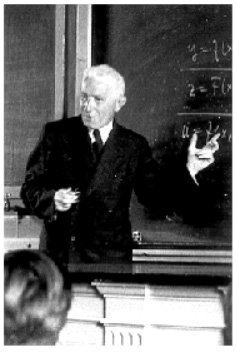
- Pál (date unknown)
- Born: 27 June 1881; Győr, Hungary
- Died: 6 September 1946 (aged 65); Copenhagen, Denmark
- Scientific career
- Fields: Mathematics

Gyula Pál (27 June 1881 – 6 September 1946) was a noted Hungarian-Danish mathematician. He is known for his work on Jordan curves both in plane and space, and on the Kakeya problem. He proved that every locally connected planar continuum with at least two points is the orthogonal projection of a closed Jordan curve of the Euclidean 3-space.

He was born as Gyula Perl but hungaricized his surname to Pál in 1909. Fleeing the post-war chaos of Hungary after World War I he moved to Denmark in 1919, possibly by the invitation of Harald Bohr, where he spent the rest of his life and westernized his name to Julius Pal.
