= Sōichi Kakeya =

Japanese mathematician (1886–1947)

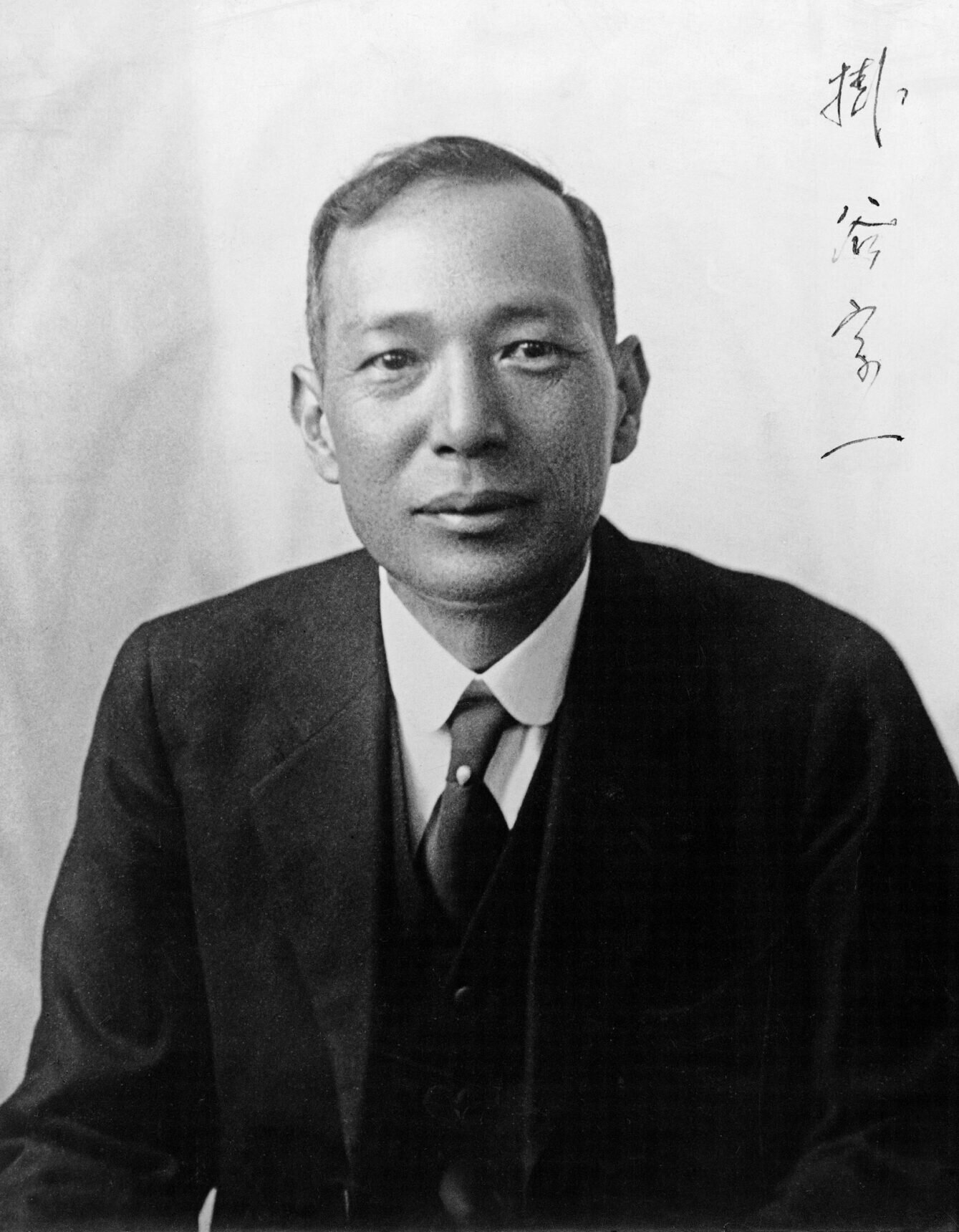
- Born: 18 January 1886; Fukayasu, Japan
- Died: 9 January 1947 (aged 60)
- Education: Imperial University of Tokyo
- Known for: Kakeya set Kakeya conjecture Eneström-Kakeya theorem
- Scientific career
- Fields: Mathematics
- Workplaces: Imperial University of Tokyo; Tokyo Bunri University; Institute of Statistical Mathematics

Sōichi Kakeya (掛谷 宗一, Kakeya Sōichi; January 18, 1886 – January 9, 1947) was a Japanese mathematician who worked mainly in mathematical analysis and who posed the Kakeya problem and solved a version of the transportation problem. He received the Imperial Prize of the Japan Academy in 1928, and was elected to the Japan Academy in 1934.

== Biography ==
Kakeya was born in 1886 in Tsubou Village, Fukayasu District, Hiroshima (now part of Fukuyama City). He entered Tokyo Imperial University in 1906 to study mathematics. As an undergraduate, he won scholarships in his second and third years and received the Dr. Morlaix Commemorative Prize in Mathematics in 1908. After graduating university in July 1909, he taught at Daiichi High School before joining Tohoku University (then Tohoku Imperial University) as an assistant professor. He obtained his Doctor of Science in 1916. Kakeya was promoted to full professor and remained at Tohoku until 1919.

He then became a professor at Tokyo Higher Normal School (1920), Tokyo Bunri University (1929), and Tokyo Imperial University (1930). Kakeya served as Dean of Tokyo Imperial University's Faculty of Science in 1945 and was the inaugural director of the Institute of Statistical Mathematics from 1945 until his death in 1947.

== Mathematical contributions ==
Kakeya's research spanned geometry, algebra, complex analysis, and real analysis, including foundational work on:

- Simultaneous integral equations (Imperial Prize-winning work, first published in 1913)
- Kakeya needle problem (posed during his Tohoku tenure)
- Root distribution of algebraic equations (Eneström–Kakeya theorem)

Kakeya presented his work on the roots of algebraic equations as an invited lecture at the 1928 International Congress of Mathematicians in Bologna.

Kakeya's works emphasized originality, as noted by colleague Tatsuo Kawada: "I grasp new problems on my own... rather than just imitating other people's work."

He posed the Kakeya conjecture (掛谷問題) during his tenure at Tohoku University, asking for the smallest area in which a unit line segment can be rotated 360 degrees. A few years later, Abram Besicovitch found a "Perron tree"-type construction that can have an arbitrarily small area if non-convex. The problem inspired the study of Kakeya sets in higher dimensions.

== Awards ==
- Imperial Prize of the Japan Academy (1928) for the work "On the System of Integral Equations and the Function-Theoretical Problems Relating to it"
- Elected to the Japan Academy (1934)
