= Restriction conjecture =

Conjecture about the behaviour of the Fourier transform on curved hypersurfaces

In harmonic analysis, the restriction conjecture, also known as the Fourier restriction conjecture, is a conjecture about the behaviour of the Fourier transform on curved hypersurfaces. It was first hypothesized by Elias Stein. The conjecture states that two necessary conditions needed to solve a problem known as the restriction problem in that scenario are also sufficient.

The restriction conjecture is closely related to the Kakeya conjecture, Bochner-Riesz conjecture and the local smoothing conjecture.

On October 26, 2026, OpenAI made an announcement claiming to have proved the local smoothing conjecture (among others), and thus the restriction conjecture by implication. As of October 26, 2026, the claim has not been peer reviewed.

== Statement ==
The restriction conjecture states that $\|\widehat{g\,d\sigma}\|_{L^q(\mathbb R^n)} \lesssim \|g\|_{L^p(S^{n-1})}$ for certain q and n, where $\|f\|_{L^p}$ represents the L^{p} norm, or $\int_{-\infty}^\infty f(x)^p \, dx$ and $f \lesssim g$ means that $f \le Cg$ for some constant $C$.

The requirements of q and n set by the conjecture are that $\frac{1}{q} < \frac{n-1}{2n}$ and $\frac{1}{q} \le \frac{n-1}{n+1}\frac{1}{p}$.

The restriction conjecture has been proved for dimension $n = 2$ as of 2021.
