= Kenneth Falconer =

English mathematician (born 1952)

Kenneth Falconer CBE FRSE
- Born: 25 January 1952 (age 74); Richmond, London
- Education: Kingston Grammar School, Corpus Christi College, Cambridge
- Known for: Fractal geometry; Falconer's conjecture
- Awards: FRSE (1998); Shephard Prize (2020)
- Scientific career
- Workplaces: University of St Andrews, Bristol University
- Thesis: Properties of Convex Sets and Functions Determined by Sectional Integrals (1979)
- Doctoral advisor: Hallard Croft

Kenneth John Falconer CBE FRSE (born 25 January 1952) is a British mathematician working in mathematical analysis and in particular on fractal geometry. He is Regius Professor of Mathematics in the School of Mathematics and Statistics at the University of St Andrews.

== Research ==
Falconer is known for his work on the mathematics of fractals and in particular sets and measures arising from iterated function systems, especially self-similar and self-affine sets. Closely related is his research on Hausdorff and other fractal dimensions. He formulated Falconer's conjecture on the dimension of distance sets and conceived the notion of a digital sundial. In combinatorial geometry he established a lower bound of 5 for the chromatic number of the plane in the Lebesgue measurable case.

== Education and career ==
Falconer was educated at Kingston Grammar School, Kingston upon Thames and Corpus Christi College, Cambridge. He graduated in 1974 and completed his PhD in 1979 under the supervision of Hallard Croft.

He was a research fellow at Corpus Christi College, Cambridge from 1977 to 1980 before moving to Bristol University. He was appointed Professor of Pure Mathematics at the University of St Andrews in 1993 and was head of the School of Mathematics and Statistics from 2001 to 2004. He served on the council of the London Mathematical Society from 2000 to 2009 including as publications secretary from 2006 to 2009.

== Honours and awards ==
Falconer was elected a Fellow of the Royal Society of Edinburgh in 1998.

In 2020, he was awarded the Shephard Prize of the London Mathematical Society.

Falconer was appointed Commander of the Order of the British Empire (CBE) in the 2024 New Year Honours for services to mathematics.

== Personal life ==
Falconer was born 25 January 1952 at Bearsted Memorial Maternity Hospital outside Hampton Court Palace.

His recreational interests include long-distance walking and hill walking. He was chair of the Long Distance Walkers Association from 2000 to 2003 and editor of their journal Strider from 1987 to 1992 and 2007–12. In 2021, he was appointed a Vice President of the LDWA. He has twice climbed all the Munros as well as all the Corbetts.

== Selected publications ==
- Falconer, Kenneth (1985). The Geometry of Fractal Sets. Cambridge University Press.
- Croft, Hallard; Falconer, Kenneth; Guy, Richard (1991). Unsolved Problems in Geometry. Springer.
- Falconer, Kenneth (1997). Techniques in Fractal Geometry. John Wiley.
- Falconer, Kenneth (2013). Fractals: A Very Short Introduction. Oxford University Press.
- Falconer, Kenneth (2014). Fractal Geometry: Mathematical Foundations and Applications (3rd ed.). John Wiley & Sons.
