= Kakeya set =

Shape containing unit line segments in all directions

The deltoid (black) together with its interior is a Kakeya needle set: a needle (blue) of length 1 can perform a complete rotation within it.

In mathematics, a Kakeya set, or Besicovitch set, is a set of points in Euclidean space which contains a unit line segment in every direction. For instance, a disk of radius 1/2 in the Euclidean plane, or a ball of radius 1/2 in three-dimensional space, forms a Besicovitch set.

A Kakeya needle set (sometimes also known as a Kakeya set) is a set in the plane with a stronger property, that a unit line segment can be rotated continuously through 360 degrees within it, returning to its original position. Again, the disk of radius 1/2 is an example of a Kakeya needle set.

Much of the research in this area has studied the problem of how small such sets can be, first asked by Sōichi Kakeya in 1917. Abram Besicovitch proved in 1920 that there are Besicovitch sets in the plane of measure zero and in 1928 that there are Kakeya needle sets in the plane of arbitrarily small positive measure. There are no Kakeya needle sets of measure 0. The Kakeya conjecture states that Besicovitch sets in n-dimensional space must have Hausdorff dimension n; it remains open for n>3. These questions belong to geometric measure theory.

== Besicovitch sets of measure zero ==
In 1920, while considering a problem of integration, Besicovitch showed that there are Besicovitch sets in the plane of measure zero. Such sets can be constructed using the Perron tree method explained below, without the need for Pál joins. There are also other methods; for example, Kahane uses Cantor sets to construct a Besicovitch set of measure zero in the plane.

== Kakeya needle problem ==
The Kakeya needle problem asks whether there is a minimum area of a region $D$ in the plane, in which a needle of unit length can be turned through 360°. This question was first posed, for convex regions, by Sōichi Kakeya (1917). The minimum area for convex sets is achieved by an equilateral triangle of height 1 and area 1/√3, as Gyula Pál showed in 1920.

Kakeya seems to have suggested that the Kakeya set $D$ of minimum area, without the convexity restriction, would be a three-pointed deltoid shape. However, this is false; there are smaller non-convex Kakeya sets.

=== Kakeya needle sets of arbitrarily small measure ===
"Sprouting the Perron tree": a method for constructing a Kakeya set of small measure. Shown here are two possible ways of dividing a triangle and overlapping the pieces to get a smaller set, the first with two triangles, and the second with eight. The method can be used to construct an arbitrarily small set by cutting up the original triangle to $2^n$ pieces. See for details.

Abram Besicovitch was able to show in 1928 that there is no lower bound > 0 for the area of such a region $D$, in which a needle of unit length can be turned around. That is, for every $\varepsilon>0$, there is region of area $\varepsilon$ within which the needle can move through a continuous motion that rotates it a full 360 degrees. The AMS produced a film in 1962 in which Besicovitch explains a construction of such a set.

One method of constructing a Kakeya needle set of arbitrary small area (and also of a Besicovitch set of measure zero) is known as a "Perron tree", named after Oskar Perron who simplified Besicovitch's original construction. The precise construction and numerical bounds are given in Besicovitch's popularization.

The first observation to make is that the needle can move in a straight line as far as it wants without sweeping any area. This is because the needle is a zero width line segment. The second trick of Pál, known as Pál joins, describes how to move the needle between any two locations that are parallel while sweeping negligible area. The needle will follow the shape of an "N". It moves from the first location some distance $r$ up the left of the "N", sweeps out the angle to the middle diagonal, moves down the diagonal, sweeps out the second angle, and then moves up the parallel right side of the "N" until it reaches the required second location. The only non-zero area regions swept are the two circle segments at the corners of the "N". The swept area is proportional to the angle which is proportional to $1/r$, and thus the swept out area can be made arbitrarily small by choosing an appropriately large $r$.

The construction starts with any triangle with height 1 and some substantial angle at the top through which the needle can easily sweep. (See figure to the right.) The goal is to do many operations on this triangle to make its area smaller while keeping the directions through which the needle can sweep the same. First, consider dividing the triangle into two and translating the pieces over each other so that their bases overlap in a way that minimizes the total area. The needle is able to sweep out the same directions by sweeping out those given by the first triangle, jumping over to the second, and then sweeping out the directions given by the second. The needle can jump triangles using the "N" technique because the two lines at which the original triangle was cut are parallel. In this construction, the line segment actually leaves the original overlapping triangle area and sweeps out new additional (arbitrarily small) area.

Now, we divide our triangle into 2^{n} subtriangles. The figure shows eight. For each consecutive pair of triangles, perform the same overlapping operation we described before to get half as many new shapes, each consisting of two overlapping triangles. Next, overlap consecutive pairs of these new shapes by shifting them so that their bases overlap in a way that minimizes the total area. Repeat this n times until there is only one shape. Again, the needle is able to sweep out the same directions by sweeping those out in each of the 2^{n} subtriangles in order of their direction. The needle can jump consecutive triangles using the "N" technique because the two lines at which these triangle were cut are parallel.

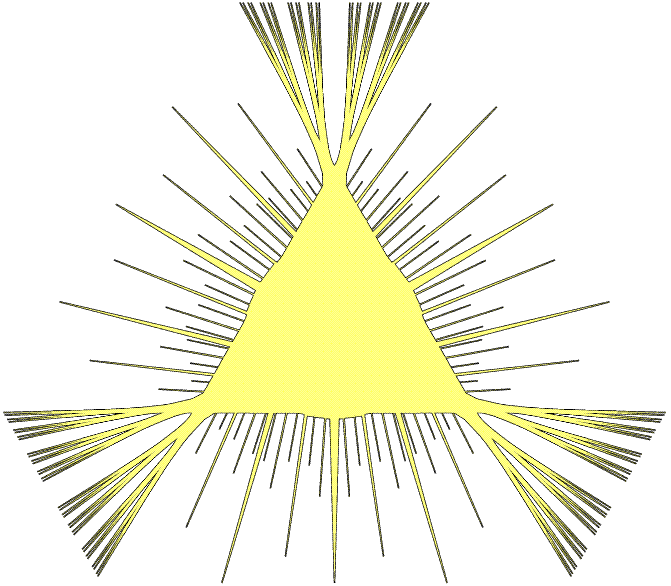
A Kakeya needle set constructed from Perron trees.

A detailed analysis of the emerging figure shows that its area shrinks to zero as n grows. A Besicovitch set can be created by combining six rotations of a Perron tree created from an equilateral triangle.

In 1941, H. J. Van Alphen showed that there are arbitrary small Kakeya needle sets inside a circle with radius 2 + ε (arbitrary ε > 0). Simply connected Kakeya needle sets with smaller area than the deltoid were found in 1965. Melvin Bloom and I. J. Schoenberg independently presented simply connected Kakeya needle sets with areas approaching to $\tfrac{\pi}{24}(5 - 2\sqrt{2})$, the Bloom-Schoenberg number (≈0.2843). Schoenberg conjectured that this number is the lower bound for the area of simply connected Kakeya needle sets. However, in 1971, F. Cunningham showed that, given ε > 0, there is a simply connected Kakeya needle set of area less than ε contained in a circle of radius 1.

Although there are Kakeya needle sets of arbitrarily small positive measure and Besicovitch sets of measure 0, there are no Kakeya needle sets of measure 0.

== Kakeya conjecture ==
=== Statement ===
The same question of how small these Besicovitch sets could be was then posed in higher dimensions, giving rise to a number of conjectures known collectively as the Kakeya conjectures, and have helped initiate the field of mathematics known as geometric measure theory. In particular, if there exist Besicovitch sets of measure zero, could they also have s-dimensional Hausdorff measure zero for some dimensions less than the dimension of the space in which they lie? This question gives rise to the following conjecture:

Kakeya set conjecture: A subset of Euclidean space $\Bbb{R}^n$ that contains a unit line segment in every direction must have Hausdorff dimension $n$.

This is known to be true for n = 1, 2, 3 but only partial results are known in higher dimensions.

The Kakeya conjecture is closely related to the restriction conjecture, Bochner-Riesz conjecture and the local smoothing conjecture.

In February 2025, a proof for the case n = 3 was posted on arXiv by Hong Wang and Joshua Zahl. The Kakeya conjecture in three dimensions is described as "one of the most sought-after open problems in geometric measure theory", and in 2026 Hong Wang was awarded the Fields Medal in part due to this work.

=== Kakeya maximal function ===
A modern way of approaching this problem is to consider a particular type of maximal function, which we construct as follows: Denote S^{n−1} ⊂ R^{n} to be the unit sphere in n-dimensional space. Define $T_{e}^{\delta}(a)$ to be the cylinder of length 1, radius δ > 0, centered at the point a ∈ R^{n}, and whose long side is parallel to the direction of the unit vector e ∈ S^{n−1}. Then for a locally integrable function f, we define the Kakeya maximal function of f to be
$$f_{*}^{\delta}(e) = \sup_{a\in\mathbf{R}^{n}}\frac{1}{m(T_{e}^{\delta}(a))}\int_{T_{e}^{\delta}(a)}|f(y)|dm(y),$$
where m denotes the n-dimensional Lebesgue measure. Notice that $f_{*}^{\delta}$ is defined for vectors e in the sphere S^{n−1}.

Then there is a conjecture for these functions that, if true, will imply the Kakeya set conjecture for higher dimensions:

Kakeya maximal function conjecture: For all ε > 0, there exists a constant C_{ε} > 0 such that for any function f and all δ > 0, (see lp space for notation)

$$\left \|f_{*}^{\delta} \right \|_{L^n(\mathbf{S}^{n-1})} \leqslant C_{\epsilon} \delta^{-\epsilon}\left\|f\right\|_{L^n(\mathbf{R}^{n})}.$$

=== Results ===
Some results toward proving the Kakeya conjecture are the following:

- The Kakeya conjecture is true for n = 1 (trivially) and n = 2 (Davies).
- In any n-dimensional space, Wolff showed that the dimension of a Kakeya set must be at least (n+2)/2.
- In 2002, Katz and Tao improved Wolff's bound to $(2-\sqrt{2})(n-4)+3$, which is better for n > 4.
- In 2000, Katz, Łaba, and Tao proved that the Minkowski dimension of Kakeya sets in 3 dimensions is strictly greater than 5/2.
- In 2000, Jean Bourgain connected the Kakeya problem to arithmetic combinatorics which involves harmonic analysis and additive number theory.
- In 2017, Katz and Zahl improved the lower bound on the Hausdorff dimension of Besicovitch sets in 3 dimensions to $5/2+\epsilon$ for an absolute constant $\epsilon>0$.
- In 2025, Hong Wang and Zahl proved the Kakeya conjecture in three dimensions, building on their earlier proof of the sticky case.
- As part of its October 2026 release of mathematical papers, OpenAI published a preprint claiming to prove the Kakeya conjecture in four dimensions.
- On October 26, 2026, OpenAI claimed to have proved the local smoothing conjecture, which implies the Kakeya conjecture in all dimensions.

== Applications to analysis ==
Somewhat surprisingly, these conjectures have been shown to be connected to a number of questions in other fields, notably in harmonic analysis. For instance, in 1971, Charles Fefferman was able to use the Besicovitch set construction to show that in dimensions greater than 1, truncated Fourier integrals taken over balls centered at the origin with radii tending to infinity need not converge in L^{p} norm when p ≠ 2 (this is in contrast to the one-dimensional case where such truncated integrals do converge).

== Analogues and generalizations of the Kakeya problem ==
=== Sets containing circles and spheres ===
Analogues of the Kakeya problem include considering sets containing more general shapes than lines, such as circles.

- In 1997 and 1999, Wolff proved that sets containing a sphere of every radius must have full dimension, that is, the dimension is equal to the dimension of the space it is lying in, and proved this by proving bounds on a circular maximal function analogous to the Kakeya maximal function.
- It was conjectured that there existed sets of measure zero containing a sphere around every point. Results of Elias Stein proved all such sets must have positive measure when n ≥ 3, and Marstrand proved the same for the case $n=2$.

=== Sets containing k-dimensional disks ===
A generalization of the Kakeya conjecture is to consider sets that contain, instead of segments of lines in every direction, but, say, portions of k-dimensional subspaces. Define an (n, k)-Besicovitch set K to be a compact set in R^{n} containing a translate of every k-dimensional unit disk which has Lebesgue measure zero. That is, if B denotes the unit ball centered at zero, for every k-dimensional subspace P, there exists x ∈ R^{n} such that (P ∩ B) + x ⊆ K. Hence, a (n, 1)-Besicovitch set is the standard Besicovitch set described earlier.

The (n, k)-Besicovitch conjecture: There are no (n, k)-Besicovitch sets for k > 1.

In 1979, Marstrand proved that there were no (3, 2)-Besicovitch sets. At around the same time, however, Falconer proved that there were no (n, k)-Besicovitch sets for 2k > n. The best bound to date is by Bourgain, who proved in that no such sets exist when 2^{k−1} + k > n.

=== Kakeya sets in vector spaces over finite fields ===
In 1999, Wolff posed the finite field analogue to the Kakeya problem, in hopes that the techniques for solving this conjecture could be carried over to the Euclidean case.

Finite Field Kakeya Conjecture: Let F be a finite field or order q, let K ⊆ F^{n} be a Kakeya set, i.e. for each vector y ∈ F^{n} there exists x ∈ F^{n} such that K contains a line {x + ty | t ∈ F}. Then the set K has size at least c_{n}q^{n}.

Zeev Dvir proved this conjecture in 2008, showing that the statement holds for c_{n} = 1/n!. In his proof, he observed that any polynomial in n variables of degree less than |F| vanishing on a Kakeya set must be identically zero. On the other hand, the polynomials in n variables of degree less than |F| form a vector space of dimension
$${|\mathbf{F}|+n-1\choose n}\ge \frac{|\mathbf{F}|^n}{n!}.$$

Therefore, there is at least one non-trivial polynomial of degree less than |F| that vanishes on any given set with less than this number of points. Combining these two observations shows that Kakeya sets must have at least |F|^{n}/n! points.

It is not clear whether the techniques will extend to proving the original Kakeya conjecture but this proof does lend credence to the original conjecture by making essentially algebraic counterexamples unlikely. Dvir has written a survey article on progress on the finite field Kakeya problem and its relationship to randomness extractors.

== See also ==
- Nikodym set
- Cantor set
