= Falconer's conjecture =

On distance sets of high-dimensional sets

In geometric measure theory, Falconer's conjecture, named after Kenneth Falconer, is an unsolved problem concerning the sets of Euclidean distances between points in compact $d$-dimensional spaces. Intuitively, it states that a set of points that is large in its Hausdorff dimension must determine a set of distances that is large in measure. More precisely, if $S$ is a compact set of points in $d$-dimensional Euclidean space whose Hausdorff dimension is strictly greater than $d/2$, then the conjecture states that the set of distances between pairs of points in $S$ must have nonzero Lebesgue measure.

In 2026, OpenAI published a preprint claiming to prove the conjecture.

== Formulation and motivation ==
Falconer (1985) proved that Borel sets with Hausdorff dimension greater than $(d+1)/2$ have distance sets with nonzero measure. He motivated this result as a multidimensional generalization of the Steinhaus theorem, a previous result of Hugo Steinhaus proving that every set of real numbers with nonzero measure must have a difference set that contains an interval of the form $(-\varepsilon,\varepsilon)$ for some $\varepsilon>0$. It may also be seen as a continuous analogue of the Erdős distinct distances problem, which states that large finite sets of points must have large numbers of distinct distances.

Based on this result, Falconer's conjecture states that if $S$ is a compact set of points in $d$-dimensional Euclidean space whose Hausdorff dimension is strictly greater than $d/2$, then the set of distances between pairs of points in $S$ must have nonzero Lebesgue measure. That is, the threshold dimension of $(d+1)/2$ from Falconer's result can be reduced to $d/2$, while restricting the class of sets in the result to compact sets rather than Borel sets.

== Partial results ==
Erdoğan (2005) proved that compact sets of points whose Hausdorff dimension is greater than $\tfrac{d}{2} + \tfrac{1}{3}$ have distance sets with nonzero measure; for large values of $d$ this approximates the threshold on Hausdorff dimension given by the Falconer conjecture. For points in the Euclidean plane, Borel sets of Hausdorff dimension greater than 5/4 (or $\tfrac{d}{2} + \tfrac{1}{4}$ with $d=2$) have distance sets with nonzero measure and, more strongly, they have a point such that the Lebesgue measure of the distances from the set to this point is positive. For $d>3$ the best known bound is $\tfrac{d}{2} + \tfrac{1}{4}-\tfrac{1}{8d+4}$ according to a preprint by Du, Ou, Ren and Zhang

A variant of Falconer's conjecture states that, for points in the plane, a compact set whose Hausdorff dimension is greater than or equal to one must have a distance set of Hausdorff dimension one. As a partial result in this direction, the existence of a distance set of Hausdorff dimension one follows for sets of Hausdorff dimension greater than 5/4, from the results on measure. Another partial result is that a compact planar set with Hausdorff dimension at least one, the distance set must have Hausdorff dimension at least 1/2.

== Related conjectures ==
Proving a bound strictly greater than 1/2 for the dimension of the distance set in the case of compact planar sets with Hausdorff dimension at least one would be equivalent to resolving several other unsolved conjectures. These include a conjecture of Paul Erdős on the existence of Borel subrings of the real numbers with fractional Hausdorff dimension, and a variant of the Kakeya set problem on the Hausdorff dimension of sets such that, for every possible direction, there is a line segment whose intersection with the set has high Hausdorff dimension. These conjectures were solved by Bourgain.

== Other distance functions ==
For non-Euclidean distance functions in the plane defined by polygonal norms, the analogue of the Falconer conjecture is false: there exist sets of Hausdorff dimension two whose distance sets have measure zero.
