= Péter Varjú =

Hungarian mathematician (born 1982)

- Born: Szeged, Hungary
- Education: University of Szeged; Princeton University
- Awards: EMS Prize (2016); Whitehead Prize (2018)
- Scientific career
- Fields: Mathematics
- Workplaces: Cambridge University
- Thesis: Random walks and spectral gaps in linear groups (2011)
- Doctoral advisor: Jean Bourgain

Péter Varjú is a Hungarian mathematician who works in harmonic analysis and ergodic theory. He is a professor at the University of Cambridge.

== Education and career ==
Varjú was born in Szeged. He did his undergraduate studies at the University of Szeged and his doctoral studies at Princeton University, where he defended his thesis Random walks and spectral gaps in linear groups in 2011 under the supervision of Jean Bourgain.

He works at the University of Cambridge, as a professor in the Department of Pure Mathematics and Mathematical Statistics.

== Research ==
Varjú studied the construction of expander graphs with number-theoretic methods involving arithmetic groups^{[A]} and questions about the uniform distribution of random walks in arithmetic groups with Bourgain^{[B]} and in Euclidean isometries with Elon Lindenstrauss.^{[C]}^{[D]}

== Recognition ==
Varjú received the 2016 EMS Prize and the 2018 Whitehead Prize. As a graduate student at Princeton, he was also a Fulbright Fellow.

== Selected publications ==
A.	Golsefidy, A. Salehi; Varjú, Péter P. (2012), "Expansion in perfect groups", Geometric and Functional Analysis, 22 (6): 1832–1891, arXiv:1108.4900, doi:10.1007/s00039-012-0190-7, MR 3000503

B.	Bourgain, Jean; Varjú, Péter P. (2012), "Expansion in $SL_d(\Z/q\Z)$, $q$ arbitrary", Inventiones Mathematicae, 188 (1): 151–173, arXiv:1006.3365, doi:10.1007/s00222-011-0345-4, MR 2897695

C.	Lindenstrauss, Elon; Varjú, Péter P. (2016), "Random walks in the group of Euclidean isometries and self-similar measures", Duke Mathematical Journal, 165 (6): 1061–1127, arXiv:1405.4426, doi:10.1215/00127094-3167490, MR 3486415

D.	Varjú, Péter Pál (2015), "Random walks in Euclidean space", Annals of Mathematics, 2nd Series, 181 (1): 243–301, arXiv:1205.3399, doi:10.4007/annals.2015.181.1.4, MR 3272926
