= Nets Katz =

Mathematics professor

Nets Hawk Katz is the W.L. Moody Professor of Mathematics at Rice University. He was a professor of mathematics at Indiana University Bloomington until March 2013 and the IBM Professor of Mathematics at the California Institute of Technology until 2023. He is currently the W. L. Moody Professor of Mathematics at Rice University.

Katz earned a B.A. in mathematics from Rice University in 1990 at the age of 17. He received his Ph.D. in 1993 under Dennis DeTurck at the University of Pennsylvania, with a dissertation titled "Noncommutative Determinants and Applications".

He is the author of several important results in combinatorics (especially additive combinatorics), harmonic analysis and other areas. In 2003, jointly with Jean Bourgain and Terence Tao, he proved that any subset of $\Z/p\Z$ grows substantially under either addition or multiplication. More precisely, if $A$ is a set such that $\max(|A \cdot A|, |A+A|) \leq K|A|$, then $A$ has size at most $K^C$ or at least $p/K^C$ where $C$ is a constant that depends on $A$. This result was followed by the subsequent work of Bourgain, Sergei Konyagin and Glibichuk, establishing that every approximate field is almost a field.

Somewhat earlier he was involved in establishing new bounds in connection with the dimension of Kakeya sets. Jointly with Izabella Łaba and Terence Tao he proved that the upper Minkowski dimension of Kakeya sets in 3 dimensions is strictly greater than 5/2, and jointly with Terence Tao he established new bounds in large dimensions.

In 2010, Katz along with Larry Guth published the results of their collaborative effort to solve the Erdős distinct distances problem, in which they found a "near-optimal" result, proving that a set of $N$ points in the plane has at least $cN / \log N$ distinct distances.

In early 2011, in joint work with Michael Bateman, he improved the best known bounds in the cap set problem: if $A$ is a subset of $(\Z/3\Z)^n$ of cardinality at least $3^n/n^{1+c}$, where $c > 0$, then $A$ contains three elements in a line.

In 2012, he was named a Guggenheim fellow. During 2011–2012, he was the managing editor of the Indiana University Mathematics Journal. In 2014, he was an invited speaker at the International Congress of Mathematicians at Seoul and gave a talk The flecnode polynomial: a central object in incidence geometry. In 2015, he received the Clay Research Award.

== Work ==
- Katz, Nets Hawk; Tao, Terence (2002). "New bounds for Kakeya problems". Journal d'Analyse Mathématique. 87: 231–263. arXiv:math/0102135. doi:10.1007/BF02868476. MR 1945284. S2CID 119644987.
- Bourgain, Jean; Katz, Nets Hawk; Tao, Terence (2004). "A sum-product estimate in finite fields, and applications". Geometric and Functional Analysis. 14 (1): 27–57. arXiv:math/0301343. doi:10.1007/s00039-004-0451-1. MR 2053599. S2CID 14097626.
