= Ruixiang Zhang =

Chinese-American mathematician

- 张瑞祥
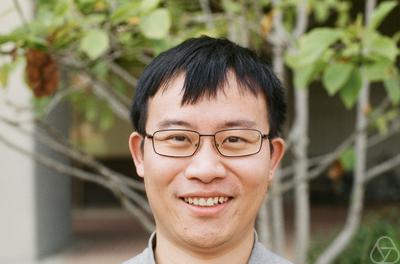
- Zhang at Berkeley in 2021
- Born: Zhang Ruixiang; China
- Education: Peking University (BS); Princeton University (PhD)
- Awards: Sloan Research Fellowship (2019); SASTRA Ramanujan Prize (2023)
- Scientific career
- Fields: Mathematics
- Workplaces: Institute for Advanced Study; University of Wisconsin, Madison; University of California, Berkeley
- Thesis: Perturbed Brascamp-Lieb inequalities and application to Parsell-Vinogradov systems (2017)
- Doctoral advisor: Peter Sarnak
- Website: sites.google.com/view/ruixiang-zhang/

Ruixiang Zhang (Chinese: 张瑞祥) is a Chinese mathematician specializing in Euclidean harmonic analysis, analytic number theory, geometry and additive combinatorics. He is an assistant professor in the Department of Mathematics at University of California, Berkeley. He and collaborator Shaoming Guo of the University of Wisconsin proved a multivariable generalization of the central conjecture in Vinogradov's mean-value theorem. Zhang was awarded the 2023 SASTRA Ramanujan Prize for his contributions to mathematics.

== Education and career ==
Zhang was born and raised in China. Representing China, he earned a gold medal at the 2008 International Mathematical Olympiad held in Madrid. He obtained a BS degree from Peking University in 2012 and a PhD from Princeton University in 2017. At Princeton, Zhang worked under the supervision of Peter Sarnak; his doctoral dissertation was Perturbed Brascamp-Lieb inequalities and application to Parsell-Vinogradov systems. After receiving his PhD, Zhang remained in Princeton for a post-doctoral year as a member of the Institute for Advanced Study and then spent three years as the Van Vleck Visiting Assistant Professor at the University of Wisconsin-Madison. In 2020, he returned to Princeton and spent one more year as a member of the Institute for Advanced Study. He has been a member of the Berkeley mathematics faculty since July 2021.

== Research ==
Zhang's contributions to mathematics include a generalization of an important conjecture in Vinogradov's Mean-Value Theorem, using novel techniques to solve Carleson's problem on pointwise convergence of solutions to the Schrödinger equation and solving the two-dimensional case of Sogge's conjecture for wave equations.

== Awards and recognition ==
Two of Zhang's research papers were selected for the Frontier Science Award in two separate categories during the International Congress for Basic Science held in Beijing in July 2023. He is a recipient of the Sloan Research Fellowship and a winner of the Silver Prize for his doctoral thesis in the 5th New World Mathematics Awards. He is an Editor of Bulletin of the London Mathematical Society, Journal of the London Mathematical Society and Pacific Journal of Mathematics.
