= Bochner–Riesz mean =

Summability method used in harmonic analysis

The Bochner–Riesz mean is a summability method often used in harmonic analysis when considering convergence of Fourier series and Fourier integrals. It was introduced by Salomon Bochner as a modification of the Riesz mean.

== Definition ==
Define

$$(\xi)_+ = \begin{cases} \xi, & \mbox{if }  \xi > 0  \\ 0,  & \mbox{otherwise}. \end{cases}$$

Let $f$ be a periodic function, thought of as being on the n-torus, $\mathbb{T}^n$, and having Fourier coefficients $\hat{f}(k)$ for $k \in \mathbb{Z}^n$. Then the Bochner–Riesz means of complex order $\delta$, $B_R^\delta f$ of (where $R > 0$ and $\mbox{Re}(\delta) > 0$) are defined as

$$B_R^\delta f(\theta) = \underset{|k| \leq R}{\sum_{k \in \mathbb{Z}^n}} \left( 1- \frac{|k|^2}{R^2} \right)_+^\delta \hat{f}(k) e^{2 \pi i k \cdot \theta}.$$

Analogously, for a function $f$ on $\mathbb{R}^n$ with Fourier transform $\hat{f}(\xi)$, the Bochner–Riesz means of complex order $\delta$, $S_R^\delta f$ (where $R > 0$ and $\mbox{Re}(\delta) > 0$) are defined as

$$S_R^\delta f(x) = \int_{|\xi| \leq R} \left(1 - \frac{|\xi|^2}{R^2} \right)_+^\delta \hat{f}(\xi) e^{2 \pi i x \cdot \xi}\,d\xi.$$

== Application to convolution operators ==
For $\delta > 0$ and $n=1$, $S_R^\delta$ and $B_R^\delta$ may be written as convolution operators, where the convolution kernel is an approximate identity. As such, in these cases, considering the almost everywhere convergence of Bochner–Riesz means for functions in $L^p$ spaces is much simpler than the problem of "regular" almost everywhere convergence of Fourier series/integrals (corresponding to $\delta = 0$).

In higher dimensions, the convolution kernels become "worse behaved": specifically, for

$$\delta \leq \tfrac{n-1}{2}$$

the kernel is no longer integrable. Here, establishing almost everywhere convergence becomes correspondingly more difficult.

== Bochner–Riesz conjecture ==
Another question is that of for which $\delta$ and which $p$ the Bochner–Riesz means of an $L^p$ function converge in norm. This issue is of fundamental importance for $n \geq 2$, since regular spherical norm convergence (again corresponding to $\delta = 0$) fails in $L^p$ when $p \neq 2$. This was shown in a paper of 1971 by Charles Fefferman.

By a transference result, the $\mathbb{R}^n$ and $\mathbb{T}^n$ problems are equivalent to one another, and as such, by an argument using the uniform boundedness principle, for any particular $p \in (1, \infty)$, $L^p$ norm convergence follows in both cases for exactly those $\delta$ where $(1-|\xi|^2)^{\delta}_+$ is the symbol of an $L^p$ bounded Fourier multiplier operator.

For $n=2$, that question has been completely resolved, but for $n \geq 3$, it has only been partially answered. The case of $n=1$ is not interesting here as convergence follows for $p \in (1, \infty)$ in the most difficult $\delta = 0$ case as a consequence of the $L^p$ boundedness of the Hilbert transform and an argument of Marcel Riesz.

Define $\delta (p)$, the "critical index", as

$$\max( n|1/p - 1/2| - 1/2, 0)$$.

Then the Bochner–Riesz conjecture states that

$$\delta > \delta (p)$$

is the necessary and sufficient condition for a $L^p$ bounded Fourier multiplier operator. It is known that the condition is necessary.
