= Larry Guth =

American mathematician

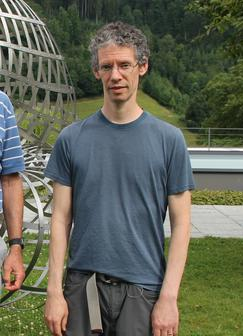
- Guth at Oberwolfach in 2025
- Born: Lawrence David Guth; 1977 (age 48–49)
- Education: Yale University (BS); Massachusetts Institute of Technology (PhD)
- Parent: Alan Guth (father)
- Awards: Salem Prize (2013); Clay Research Award (2015); New Horizons in Mathematics Prize (2016); Bôcher Memorial Prize (2020); Maryam Mirzakhani Prize (2020)
- Scientific career
- Fields: Mathematics
- Workplaces: Stanford; University of Toronto; New York University; MIT
- Thesis: Area-contracting maps between rectangles (2005)
- Doctoral advisor: Tomasz Mrowka
- Doctoral students: Hong Wang
- Website: math.mit.edu/~lguth/

Lawrence David Guth (/ɡuːθ/; born 1977) is an American mathematician currently serving as a professor of mathematics at the Massachusetts Institute of Technology.

== Education and career ==
Guth graduated from Yale University in 2000 with a BS in mathematics.

In 2005, he received his PhD in mathematics from the Massachusetts Institute of Technology (MIT), where he studied geometry of objects with random shapes under the supervision of Tomasz Mrowka.

After MIT, Guth went to Stanford as a postdoc and later to the University of Toronto as an assistant professor on a tenure track.

In 2011, New York University's Courant Institute of Mathematical Sciences hired Guth as a professor, listing his areas of interest as "metric geometry, harmonic analysis, and geometric combinatorics."

In 2012, Guth moved to MIT, where he is Claude Shannon Professor of Mathematics.

== Research ==
In his research, Guth has strengthened Gromov's systolic inequality for essential manifolds and, along with Nets Katz, found a solution to the Erdős distinct distances problem. His interests include the Kakeya conjecture and the systolic inequality.

== Doctoral students ==
Guth has supervised graduate students at the University of Toronto and the Massachusetts Institute of Technology. His other doctoral students have included Dominic Dotterrer, Hannah Alpert, Ben Yang, Thao Do, Aleksandr Berdnikov, Alexey Balitskiy, Sahana Vasudevan, Yuqiu Fu, Shengwen Gan, Lingxian Zhang, and Sarah Tammen. His doctoral student Hong Wang received her PhD from MIT in 2019 under his supervision and was awarded the Fields Medal in 2026 for her work in harmonic analysis and geometric measure theory.

== Recognition ==
Guth won an Alfred P. Sloan Fellowship in 2010. He was an invited speaker at the International Congress of Mathematicians in India in 2010, where he spoke about systolic geometry.

In 2013, the American Mathematical Society awarded Guth its annual Salem Prize, citing his "major contributions to geometry and combinatorics."

In 2014 he received a Simons Investigator Award. In 2015, he received the Clay Research Award.

He was included in the 2019 class of fellows of the American Mathematical Society "for contributions to harmonic analysis, combinatorics and geometry, and for exposition of high level mathematics".

On February 20, 2020, the National Academy of Sciences announced that Guth is the first winner of their new $20,000 Maryam Mirzakhani Prize in Mathematics for mid-career mathematicians. The citation states that his award is "for developing surprising, original, and deep connections between geometry, analysis, topology, and combinatorics, which have led to the solution of, or major advances on, many outstanding problems in these fields." He was one of three recipients of the 2020 Bôcher Memorial Prize. In 2021, he was elected member of the US National Academy of Sciences.

== Personal ==
He is the son of Alan Guth, a theoretical physicist known for the theory of inflation in cosmology.

== Work ==
- Metaphors in systolic geometry: the video
- Guth, Larry (2011), "Volumes of balls in large Riemannian manifolds", Annals of Mathematics, 2nd ser., 173 (1): 51–76, arXiv:math.DG/0610212, doi:10.4007/annals.2011.173.1.2, MR 2753599, S2CID 1392012.
- Guth, Larry; Katz, Nets Hawk (2010), "Algebraic methods in discrete analogs of the Kakeya problem", Advances in Mathematics, 225 (5): 2828–2839, arXiv:0812.1043, doi:10.1016/j.aim.2010.05.015, MR 2680185, S2CID 15590454.
- Guth, Larry (2010), "Systolic inequalities and minimal hypersurfaces", Geometric and Functional Analysis, 19 (6): 1688–1692, arXiv:0903.5299, doi:10.1007/s00039-010-0052-0, MR 2594618, S2CID 17827200.
- Guth, Larry (2010), "The endpoint case of the Bennett–Carbery–Tao multilinear Kakeya conjecture", Acta Mathematica, 205 (2): 263–286, arXiv:0811.2251, doi:10.1007/s11511-010-0055-6, MR 2746348, S2CID 16258342.
- Guth, Larry (2009), "Minimax problems related to cup powers and Steenrod squares", Geometric and Functional Analysis, 18 (6): 1917–1987, arXiv:math/0702066, doi:10.1007/s00039-009-0710-2, MR 2491695, S2CID 10402235.
- Guth, Larry (2008), "Symplectic embeddings of polydisks", Inventiones Mathematicae, 172 (3): 477–489, arXiv:0709.1957, Bibcode:2008InMat.172..477G, doi:10.1007/s00222-007-0103-9, MR 2393077, S2CID 18065526.
- Guth, Larry (2007), "The width-volume inequality", Geometric and Functional Analysis, 17 (4): 1139–1179, arXiv:math/0609569, doi:10.1007/s00039-007-0628-5, MR 2373013, S2CID 16014518.
- Guth, Larry; Katz, Nets Hawk (2015), "On the Erdős distinct distance problem on the plane", Annals of Mathematics, 181 (1): 155–190, arXiv:1011.4105, doi:10.4007/annals.2015.181.1.2, MR 3272924, S2CID 43051852
- Guth, Larry (2016). Polynomial Methods in Combinatorics. American Mathematical Society. ISBN 978-1-4704-2890-7.
