= Fundamental theorem of asset pricing =

Necessary and sufficient conditions for a market to be arbitrage free and complete

The fundamental theorems of asset pricing (also: of arbitrage, of finance), in both financial economics and mathematical finance, provide necessary and sufficient conditions for a market to be arbitrage-free, and for a market to be complete. An arbitrage opportunity is a way of making money with no initial investment without any possibility of loss. Though arbitrage opportunities do exist briefly in real life, it has been said that any sensible market model must avoid this type of profit. The first theorem is important in that it ensures a fundamental property of market models. Completeness is a common property of market models (for instance the Black–Scholes model). A complete market is one in which every contingent claim can be replicated. Though this property is common in models, it is not always considered desirable or realistic.

== Discrete markets ==
In a discrete (i.e. finite state) market, the following hold:

1. The First Fundamental Theorem of Asset Pricing: A discrete market on a discrete probability space $(\Omega, \mathcal{F}, P)$ is arbitrage-free if, and only if, there exists at least one risk neutral probability measure that is equivalent to the original probability measure, P.
2. The Second Fundamental Theorem of Asset Pricing: An arbitrage-free market (S,B) consisting of a collection of stocks S and a risk-free bond B is complete if and only if there exists a unique risk-neutral measure that is equivalent to P and has numeraire B.

== In more general markets ==
When stock price returns follow a single Brownian motion, there is a unique risk neutral measure. When the stock price process is assumed to follow a more general sigma-martingale or semimartingale, then the concept of arbitrage is too narrow, and a stronger concept such as no free lunch with vanishing risk (NFLVR) must be used to describe these opportunities in an infinite dimensional setting.

In continuous time, a version of the fundamental theorems of asset pricing reads:

Let $S=(S_t)_{t\geq 0}$ be a d-dimensional semimartingale market (a collection of stocks), $B$ the risk-free bond and $(\Omega, \mathcal{F}, P)$ the underlying probability space. Furthermore, we call a measure $Q$ an equivalent local martingale measure if $Q \approx P$ and if the processes $\left( \frac{S^i_t }{B_t} \right) _t$ are local martingales under the measure $Q$.

1. The First Fundamental Theorem of Asset Pricing: Assume $S$ is locally bounded. Then the market $S$ satisfies NFLVR if and only if there exists an equivalent local martingale measure.
2. The Second Fundamental Theorem of Asset Pricing: Assume that there exists an equivalent local martingale measure $Q$. Then $S$ is a complete market if and only if $Q$ is the unique local martingale measure.

== See also ==
- Arbitrage pricing theory
- Asset pricing
- Financial economics § Arbitrage-free pricing and equilibrium
- Rational pricing
