= When Genius Failed =

Book by Roger Lowenstein

When Genius Failed The Rise and Fall of Long-Term Capital Management
- Front cover
- Author: Roger Lowenstein
- Language: English
- Subject: Finance
- Genre: Nonfiction
- Publisher: Random House
- Publication date: October 9, 2000
- Publication place: United States
- Media type: Paperback
- Pages: 288
- ISBN: 0-375-50317-X
- OCLC: 318223423
- Dewey Decimal: 332.6 21
- LC Class: HG4930 .L69 2000

When Genius Failed: The Rise and Fall of Long-Term Capital Management is a book by Roger Lowenstein published by Random House on October 9, 2000.

The book tells an unauthorized account of Long-Term Capital Management (LTCM), a hedge fund staffed with prominent academics and investors, which had early success for several years before an abrupt collapse and rushed bailout organized by government officials. Founded in 1993, LTCM was a tightly held American hedge fund which commanded more than $100 billion in assets at its height, then collapsed abruptly in August and September 1998. Prompted by concerns about LTCM's thousands of derivative contracts, in order to avoid a panic by banks and investors worldwide, the Federal Reserve Bank of New York stepped in to organize a bailout with the various major banks at risk.

The book's account is largely based on interviews conducted with former employees of LTCM, banks involved in the rescue, and officials at the Federal Reserve. The book received numerous accolades, including being chosen by BusinessWeek as among the best business books of 2000.

== Overview ==
The book tells the true story of the bailout of Long-Term Capital Management (LTCM), an American hedge fund founded in 1993. LTCM, headquartered in Greenwich, Connecticut, had only 100 clients, despite its large AUM size and total assets of $102 billion. Founder John W. Meriwether had previously used computer modeling to aid in trading at Salomon Brothers in the 1980s, and he brought much of his team to LTCM when it was founded. Financial theorists Myron S. Scholes and Robert C. Merton also joined the new firm, and would win Nobel Prizes while at the firm. Using its computer models, the firm's fund in 1995 and 1996 brought in a massive 40% in returns to investors. With easy access to debt funding due to lenders' perception the fund was low risk, the firm expanded exponentially, with its positions amounting to 30 or more times its capital at one point.

In 1998, volatility in the market resulted in LTCM beginning to lose $100 million per day. Starting on August 17, 1998, the fund had capital of $3.6 billion. As it started losing money, on August 21, it lost $553 million in one day, and within another five weeks, the fund was largely depleted in value. Prompted by deep concerns about LTCM's thousands of derivative contracts, in order to avoid a panic by banks and investors worldwide, the Federal Reserve Bank of New York stepped in to organize a bailout with the various major banks at risk.

The feds "invited" William J. McDonough, as well as the chiefs of Bankers Trust, Bear Stearns, Chase Manhattan, Goldman Sachs, J.P. Morgan, Lehman Brothers, Merrill Lynch, Morgan Stanley, Dean Witter, and Salomon Smith Barney, to the Fed's board-room in New York on September 2, 1998. They were also joined by the chairman of the New York Stock Exchange and the representatives of several banks in Europe. The investment banks were invited to enter a consortium to fund the bailout of LTCM. The Federal Reserve raised $4 billion from investment banks and commercial banks to stabilize LTCM in September 1998. The group "bickered and backstabbed," according to Lowenstein, but in December 1999, the bailout was complete and the firm was again functioning under a new name.

== Major characters ==
Major characters include a number of executives in the American banking industry.

- John Meriwether — LTCM founder, head of the LTCM arbitrageurs.
- Larry Hilibrand - LTCM partner
- Eric Rosenfeld - LTCM partner
- Robert C. Merton - LTCM partner
- Myron Scholes - LTCM partner
- Victor Haghani - founding partner of LTCM
- Jon Corzine — former CEO of Goldman Sachs

== Writing process and publishing ==
The book's account is largely based on interviews conducted with former employees of LTCM, the six primary banks involved in the rescue, and the Federal Reserve, as well as informal interactions by phone and e-mail with Eric Rosenfeld, one of LTCM's founding partners.

It was released September 15, 2000. As of 2014, there had been four editions in English, five editions in Japanese, one edition in Russian and one edition in Chinese.

== Reception ==
The book received numerous accolades, including being chosen by BusinessWeek as among the best business books of 2000.

Publishers Weekly gave the historical coverage a positive review, but also wrote that the author "obscures his narrative with masses of data and overwritten prose."

Kirkus Reviews dubbed it an "entertaining and informative history" of LTCM, writing that Lowenstein "excels at explaining esoteric financial topics" and that "with access to the partners’ confidential memoranda, he is also able to document LTCM's swift fall with exceptional clarity and insight." Floyd Norris, then chief financial correspondent of the New York Times, reviewed the book positively. Writes The Wall Street Journal, the book is a story of "hubris and financial peril." Kirkus said that "with a lucid style and a sense of humor and amusement, Lowenstein guides us through the thickets of high finance in the computer age."
