= Mean reversion =

Mean reversion may refer to:

- Regression toward the mean
- Ornstein–Uhlenbeck process
- Mean reversion (finance)
