= On the run (finance) =

Most recently issued of a periodically issued security

In finance, an on-the-run security or contract is the most recently issued, and hence most liquid, of a periodically issued security. On-the-run securities are generally more liquid and trade at a premium to other securities. Other, older issues are referred to as off-the-run securities, and trade at a discount to on-the-run securities.

== Examples ==
United States Treasury securities have periodic auctions; the treasury of a given tenor, say 30 years, which has most recently been auctioned is the on-the-run security, while all older treasuries of that tenor are off-the-run.

For credit default swaps, the 5-year contract sold at the most recent IMM date is the on-the-run security; it thus has remaining maturity of between 4 years, 9 months and 5 years.

A number of indices only hold on-the-run contracts, to ease trading.

== Trades ==
When a new security is issued, becoming the new on-the-run security, buying the new contract and selling the old one is called rolling the contract.

A convergence trade involves the difference in price between the on-the-run and the most recent off-the-run instrument: for long tenors, these are virtually the same instrument, and in any event, an on-the-run instrument becomes off-the-run upon the issue of a newer instrument. Thus, if the basis (difference in price) between an on-the-run and most recent off-the-run instrument becomes large, one may buy the off-the-run and sell the on-the-run in anticipation of the basis shrinking. This trade, for 30-year treasuries, is notable for having been practiced by Long-Term Capital Management.
