= 1998 financial collapse =

1998 financial collapse may refer to:

- 1998 Russian financial crisis
- The 1998 collapse of Long-Term Capital Management
