= Sigma-martingale =

Semimartingale in probability theory

In probability theory, a sigma-martingale is a semimartingale with an integral representation. Sigma-martingales were introduced by C.S. Chou and M. Emery in 1977 and 1978. In financial mathematics, sigma-martingales appear in the fundamental theorem of asset pricing as an equivalent condition to no free lunch with vanishing risk (a no-arbitrage condition).

== Mathematical definition ==
An $\mathbb{R}^d$-valued stochastic process $X:\Omega\times[0,T]\longrightarrow\mathbb{R}^{d}$ is a sigma-martingale if it is a semimartingale and there exists an $\mathbb{R}^d$-valued martingale M and an M-integrable predictable process $\phi$ with values in $\mathbb{R}_+$ such that

$X = \int_{0}^{\cdot}\phi dM,$

where integration is understood in the sense of Ito calculus.
