= JWM Partners =

Former American hedge fund

JWM Partners LLC was a hedge fund started by John Meriwether after the collapse of Long-Term Capital Management (LTCM) in 1998. LTCM was one of the most spectacular failures of Wall Street, leading to a bailout of around $4 billion that was provided by a consortium of Wall Street banks. Meriwether started the company with initial capital of $250 million with loyal quants and traders like Victor Haghani, Larry Hilibrand, Dick Leahy, Arjun Krishnamachar and Eric Rosenfeld. As of April 2008, the company had around $1.6 billion in management. Eric Rosenfeld left to start his own fund.

== Performance ==
The funds posted gains for several years, but in the first quarter of 2008 posted losses, of 14% in the Global Macro Fund, and 31% in the flagship Relative Value Opportunity bond fund. Together with redemptions, this cut the capital base significantly.

=== Mission ===
The fund claimed to use the same model as LTCM with more rigorous and better risk management. It also claimed a leverage ratio of 15 to 1.

=== Closure ===
On July 7, 2009, it was announced that the fund would be closed after suffering a loss of 44% in the main fund between September 2007 and February 2009.

== Notes ==
- Strasburg, Jenny (2008-03-27). "A Decade Later, John Meriwether Must Scramble Again: LTCM Founder Has Tough Time Stemming Losses at New Funds; A Withdrawal Deadline Nears". The Wall Street Journal.
- "JWM Partners LLC - Relative Value Opportunity fund - relative value". The Hedge Fund Implode-o-Meter. 2008-03-27. Archived from the original on 2016-05-28.
- Dunbar, Nicholas (2000). Inventing Money. New York: John Wiley & Sons. ISBN 0-471-89999-2.
