= Victor Haghani =

American businessman (born 1961/1962)

- Born: 1962 (age 63–64)
- Education: London School of Economics (B.Sc.)
- Occupation: Businessman
- Organization: Elm Wealth
- Known for: Co-founder of Long-Term Capital Management and JWM Partners

Victor Haghani (born 1962) is an Iranian-American founder of Elm Wealth, a research-driven wealth advisor and manager.

Haghani was one of the founding partners of Long-Term Capital Management (LTCM), a hedge fund which collapsed in 1998 and was eventually recapitalized and restructured by a consortium of leading banks. After the liquidation of LTCM, he became a founding partner of JWM Partners which managed a successor fund to LTCM.

== Family and education ==
The son of an Iranian international trader of a Sephardic Jewish family, Victor Haghani graduated from the London School of Economics (LSE) in 1984, where he received a B.Sc. degree in Economics. He has also taught at the LSE, where he is a Senior Research Associate in the FMG.

== Career ==
Haghani started his career in 1984 in the bond research department of Salomon Brothers and then became a managing director in the bond arbitrage group run by John Meriwether. In 1993, he co-founded Long-Term Capital Management with seven other partners. In 1993, he set up the LTCM office in London. Haghani stayed on at LTCM through 1999 to assist in the liquidation of LTCM.

After LTCM, he became a founding partner of JWM Partners, which managed a successor fund to LTCM. Since then, he has been involved in a variety of activities, including consulting and board assignments.

He has conducted research into asset allocation and low cost wealth management strategies, and he founded Elm Partners in 2011 to put those ideas into practice. Elm uses index-tracking funds to invest across the largest asset classes and tries to give its clients broad exposure to global economic growth at the lowest possible cost.

Among other topics, James White and Victor Haghani discuss the field of ergodicity economics in their book The Missing Billionaires.

== Books ==
- The Missing Billionaires (2023) ISBN 1119747910

== See also ==
- List of Iranian Americans
