= Greg Hawkins =

American hedge fund trader

Gregory Dale Hawkins was a trader and principal in the hedge fund Long-Term Capital Management that after four spectacularly successful years lost most of its clients' money in 1998 when the Russian government defaulted on its debt payments on August 17, 1998, triggering a devaluation of the Russian ruble. Long-Term Capital had $4.6 billion in portfolio losses in a few months and only avoided outright bankruptcy because the U.S. central bank prompted a consortium of large global investment banks and counter-parties of LTCM to provide an equity bailout. LTCM shutdown in early 2000.

Hawkins lives in New Rochelle in Westchester County, New York.

== Early life ==
Hawkins earned an S.B. in economics from MIT in 1976 and a Ph.D. in management from the MIT Sloan School of Management in 1982.

== Career ==
On 27 February 2008, Hawkins was put in control of Risk Oversight of Real Estate and Mortgage Exposure for Citibank.

== See also ==
- 1998 Russian financial crisis
- Long-Term Capital Management
