= A Demon of Our Own Design =

Book by Richard Bookstaber

A Demon of Our Own Design: Markets, Hedge Funds, and the Perils of Financial Innovation
- Front cover
- Author: Richard Bookstaber
- Cover artist: The Fall of Icarus by Jacob Peter Gowy
- Language: English
- Subject: Risk management, investments
- Genre: Non-fiction
- Publisher: John Wiley & Sons
- Publication date: April 2007
- Publication place: United States
- Media type: Print, e-book
- Pages: 288
- ISBN: 978-0-471-22727-4
- OCLC: 73502941
- Dewey Decimal: 332.64/524 22
- LC Class: HG4530 .B66 2007

Table of Contents
- CHAPTER 1: Introduction: The Paradox of Market Risk.
- CHAPTER 2: The Demons of ’87.
- CHAPTER 3: A New Sheriff in Town.
- CHAPTER 4: How Salomon Rolled the Dice and Lost.
- CHAPTER 5: They Bought Salomon, Then They Killed It.
- CHAPTER 6: Long-Term Capital Management Rides the Leverage Cycle to Hell.
- CHAPTER 7: Colossus.
- CHAPTER 8: Complexity, Tight Coupling, and Normal Accidents.
- CHAPTER 9: The Brave New World of Hedge Funds.
- CHAPTER 10: Cockroaches and Hedge Funds.
- CHAPTER 11: Hedge Fund Existential.
- Conclusion: Built to Crash?

A Demon of Our Own Design: Markets, Hedge Funds, and the Perils of Financial Innovation (2007) is a book by veteran Wall Street risk manager Richard Bookstaber. The book is noted for its foreshadowing of the 2008 financial crisis. Bookstaber had a "a front-row seat" for such crises as the stock market crash of 1987 and the demise of Long-Term Capital Management, and his book is built around themes drawn from those experiences.

The theme of the book is that the world financial system is vulnerable to singularities—disasters arising out of apparently trivial details, as implied by chaos theory and its Butterfly effect. He discusses the critical and often underappreciated role of liquidity in the markets and presents a theory of 'normal accidents' arising from the combination of tight coupling and complexity. Bookstaber reviews accidents such as Three Mile Island, ValueJet, and Columbia as examples of 'normal accidents' that have corollaries in the financial markets.

The efficient market hypothesis comes under attack in this book using biological and evolutionary analogies. He suggests that overspecialization to an environment leads one vulnerable to change. Therefore, the best adaptive approach is often to have a 'coarse' approach that may ignore fine grained stimuli. Risk management, however sophisticated it is or can become, will not end this vulnerability. To the contrary, "the more intricate risk-management structures may actually make the system worse." The book, in fact, "provides a warning about injudiciously applying advanced quantitative techniques to investment instruments".

The dust jacket carries a detail of "The Fall of Icarus," by Jacob Peter Gowy.
