= James Rickards =

American author and speaker

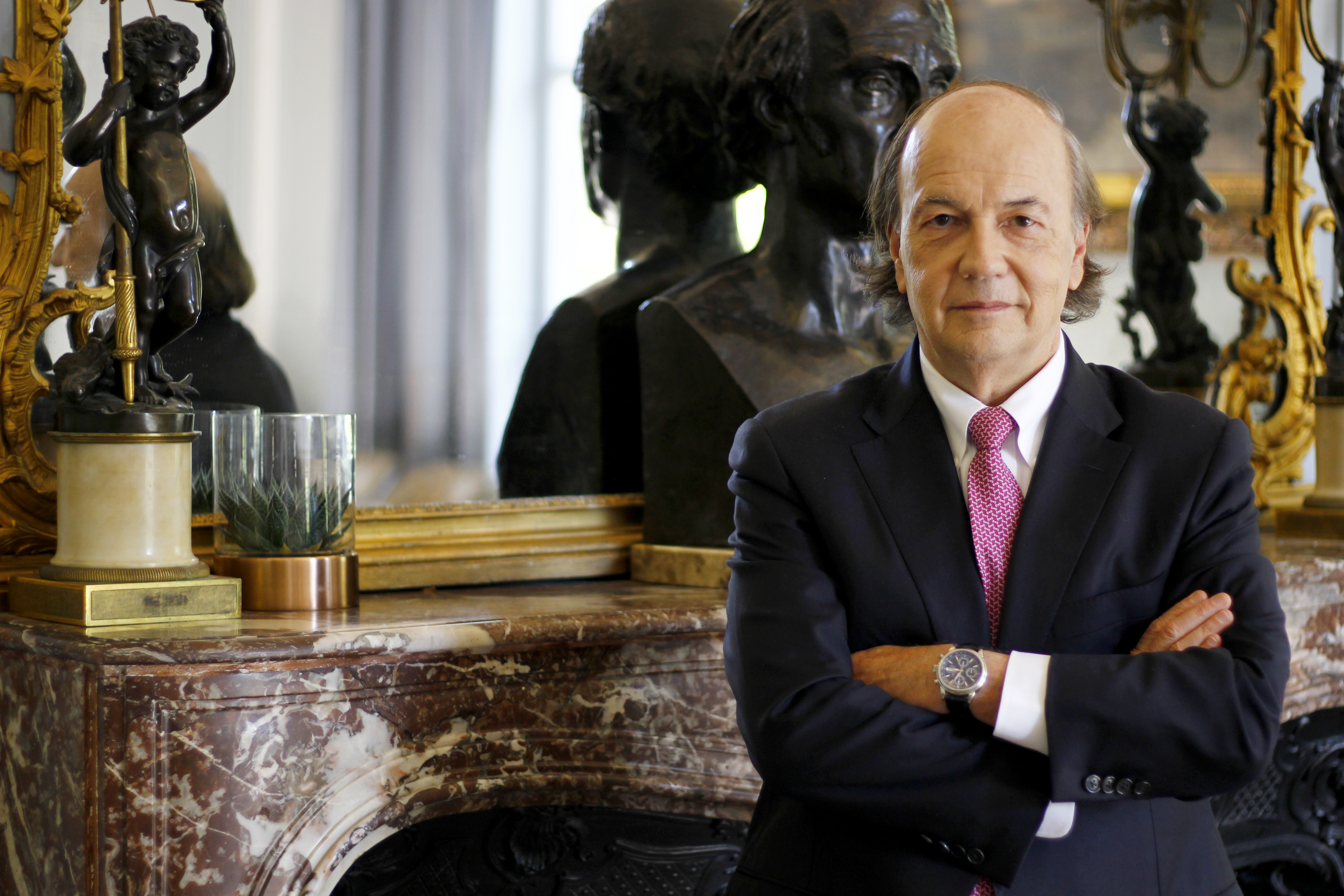
James G. Rickards

James G. Rickards (29 September 1951) is an American lawyer, investment banker, media commentator, and author on matters of finance and precious metals. He is the author of Currency Wars: The Making of the Next Global Crisis (2011) and seven

other books. He currently lives in Connecticut.

== Biography ==
Rickards graduated from Lower Cape May Regional High School in Cape May, New Jersey, in 1969. He graduated from Johns Hopkins University in 1973 with a Bachelor of Arts degree with honors, and in 1974, from the Paul H. Nitze School of Advanced International Studies in Washington, D.C., with an M.A. in international economics. He received his Juris Doctor from the University of Pennsylvania Law School and a Master of Laws in taxation from New York University School of Law.

He has held senior positions at Citibank, Long-Term Capital Management, and Caxton Associates. As general counsel for the hedge fund Long-Term Capital Management (LTCM), he successfully negotiated the $3.6 billion rescue of the firm via the U.S. Federal Reserve in 1998. Rickards worked on Wall Street for 35 years. Later, Rickards became the senior managing director at Tangent Capital Partners LLC, a merchant bank based in New York City, and also the senior managing director for market intelligence at Omnis, Inc., a technical, professional and scientific consulting firm in McLean, Va. On March 24, 2009, Rickards presented his view at a symposium at Johns Hopkins University, that the U.S. dollar was facing imminent hyperinflation and was vulnerable to attack from foreign governments through the accumulation of gold and the establishment of a new global currency.

On September 10, 2009, Rickards testified before the U.S. House Science Subcommittee on Oversight about the risks of financial modeling, value at risk, and the 2008 financial crisis.

He has also claimed he advised the U.S. Department of Defense, the U.S. intelligence community, and major hedge funds on global financial issues, and has served as a facilitator of the first ever financial war games conducted by The Pentagon. He also guest-lectures at The Kellogg School at Northwestern University and the School of Advanced International Studies at Johns Hopkins University. He states he was on the Advisory Board of the Center on Sanctions and Illicit Finance, a former organization within the conservative think tank and lobbying organization, the Foundation for Defense of Democracies (FDD) in Washington, D.C.

== Publications ==
Rickards's first book, Currency Wars: The Making of the Next Global Crisis, was published in 2011. In it, he argued that currency wars are not just an economic or monetary concern but a national security concern. He maintained that the United States faced serious threats to its national security, from clandestine gold purchases by China to the hidden agendas of sovereign wealth funds, and that greater than any single threat was the very real danger of the collapse of the dollar itself. Rickards charged that the Federal Reserve was involved in what he called "the greatest gamble in the history of finance." The Fed's easing of financial conditions through lowering long-term interest rates was, he wrote, "essentially a program of printing money to spur growth."

Rickards subsequently authored another six books:

- The Death of Money: The Coming Collapse of the International Monetary System (2014)
- The Big Drop: How To Grow Your Wealth During the Coming Collapse (2015)
- The New Case for Gold (2016)
- The Road to Ruin: The Global Elites' Secret Plan for the Next Financial Crisis (2016)
- Aftermath: Seven Secrets of Wealth Preservation in the Coming Chaos (2019)
- The New Great Depression: Winners and Losers in a Post-Pandemic World (2021)
- Sold Out: How Broken Supply Chains, Surging Inflation, and Political Instability Will Sink the Global Economy (2022)

Rickard's second book The Death of Money was released on April 8, 2014 and was a New York Times Best Seller. His third book The New Case for Gold was released on April 5, 2016. His fourth book The Road to Ruin: The Global Elites' Secret Plan for the Next Financial Crisis was released on November 15, 2016.

In The Road to Ruin, Rickards promulgates a conspiracy theory that "global elites" are using the "stalking horse" of climate change to advance a "new world order" that includes a global currency.

This is a view Rickards has expressed on various platforms:

Climate change is being used as a stalking horse by global elites to push an agenda of global taxation and global governance.

— Jim Rickards, Problems with the Global Elite — When Money is Weaponised

He is an Op-Ed contributor to The Financial Times, Evening Standard, The New York Times, and Washington Post. He is the Editor of Strategic Intelligence, a financial newsletter, and Director of The James Rickards Project, an inquiry into the complex dynamics of geopolitics and global capital.

Selected articles

- James G. Rickards, "A Mountain, Overlooked" The Washington Post (October 2, 2008). Retrieved May 16, 2011
- Charles Duelfer and Jim Rickards, "Financial Time Bombs" The New York Times (December 20, 2008). Retrieved May 16, 2011
- James Rickards, "How markets attacked the Greek piñata" The Financial Times (February 11, 2010). Retrieved May 16, 2011 (registration required)
