= Political arbitrage =

Political arbitrage is a trading strategy which involves using knowledge or estimates of future political activity to forecast and discount security values. For example, the major factor in the values of some foreign government bonds is the risk of default, which is a political decision taken by the country's government. The values of companies in war-sensitive sectors such as oil and arms are affected by political decisions to make war.

Legal trading must be based on publicly available information. However, there is a grey area involving lobbyists and market rumours. Like insider trading there is scope for conflicts of interest when political decision makers themselves are in positions to profit from private investments whose values are linked to their own public political actions.

The legality of political arbitrage exists in a grey area between legitimate market analysis and insider trading. For example, corporations frequently engage in regulatory arbitrage by hiring politically connected lobbyists to secure subsidies or exemptions. Research from University College London (UCL) indicates that firms facing intense competition often increase their political connections to safeguard commercial interests, a behavior known as rent-seeking.

== See also ==
- Insider trading
