= The Missing Billionaires =

2023 book by White and Haghani

- Author: Victor Haghani and James White
- Language: English
- Genre: Finance
- Publisher: Wiley
- Publication date: 2023
- Publication place: United States
- Media type: Print
- ISBN: 978-1119747918

The Missing Billionaires: A Guide to Better Financial Decisions is a 2023 book by James White and Victor Haghani. Haghani was a founding partner of Long-Term Capital Management.

Vladimir V. Piterbarg wrote "the authors convincingly argue that the Expected Utility framework is the right one for decision making for the bulk of financial decisions." A review in The Economist wrote "The authors' great success is in offering a consistent and explicit framework within which to do all this. At its core is the concept of 'expected utility'". However, a review in The Economic Times of India wrote that the book is simply an argument for diversification: "That's all there is to it."

== Synopsis ==
The introduction questions why there are so few US billionaires descended from historical wealthy people. If historical wealthy families had invested the money in the US stock market and spent at reasonable rates, even accounting for family growth, there would be many "old money" billionaires today, but there are not. The authors suggest this is because of "taking too much or too little risk, spending more than their wealth could support, and not adjusting their spending as their wealth fluctuated". Even in a good investment environment (the US stock market over the 20th century), these wealthy people performed poorly. The authors suggest sizing of investments is crucial. Renaissance Technologies were only successful with their bets 50.75% of the time, but were able to generate enormous returns by sizing their bets appropriately.

The authors describe an experiment they made. Subjects were given the opportunity to bet on a biased coin, which came up Heads 60% of the time. Starting with a $25 bankroll, they were given 30 minutes to try to achieve a pay-out capped at $250. Despite these favourable conditions, one third of the participants finished with less money than they started with, and 28% went bust. The correct strategy is a Kelly bet or a fraction thereof. The Kelly criterion suggests betting 20% of bankroll each time, adjusting the amount of each bet as the player's bankroll goes up and down. Assuming a player can make 300 bets in 30 minutes, betting 20% or 10% of bankroll both have a 94% probability of reaching the cap. A risk averse person will bet some fraction of the full Kelly bet. In this example, betting 10% of bankroll gets most of the expected return for only half the risk.

The authors argue that people should not try to maximise expected wealth. Rather, one should maximise expected utility. The authors recommend the use of surveys to quantify an individual's risk aversion.

The authors advocate dynamic portfolio management using CAPE to estimate the yield on equities, and allocating a portion of a portfolio to inflation protected bonds such as US TIPS (Treasury Inflation-Protected Securities). On historical data, this strategy outperformed a 100% allocation to equities, with lower risk.

The authors point out that, due to economic growth, a person whose spending power increased only with inflation would feel a reduction in welfare. They suggest using inflation + 1.5% as a benchmark to calculate excess returns.

Returns must increase with the square of risk. A quadrupling of return is required to compensate for a doubling of risk. Money managers must produce outsize returns to justify their greater fees and risk.

A retired person who spends a fixed dollar amount of their wealth each year is quite likely to go bust, whereas a person who spends a fixed percentage of their wealth each year cannot go bust. Such a person must be willing to reduce their spending 90% if the stock market declines 90%. "If you cannot abide changing your total spending, including gifts, as your wealth changes through time, then it is inconsistent for you to take investment risk in your portfolio."

For retired individuals who want to ensure a level of income until their death, the authors recommend buying an annuity, assuming it is reasonably priced, because "bearing one's own longevity risk does not offer compensation in the form of a risk premium". They can then give their remaining wealth to their children or to charity, avoiding inheritance tax. For an endowment, or a family managing generational wealth, the authors suggest an endowment which spends 2.4% of its wealth each year is unlikely to decline in value over time, and will maximise its expected utility.

Investing a large portion of your wealth in one company is unlikely to be sensible. Similarly, an entrepreneur raising money for their company may be wise to raise more money and give up a larger portion of equity, reducing their expected return but potentially increasing their expected utility.
