= Mathieu de la Porte =

French mathematician

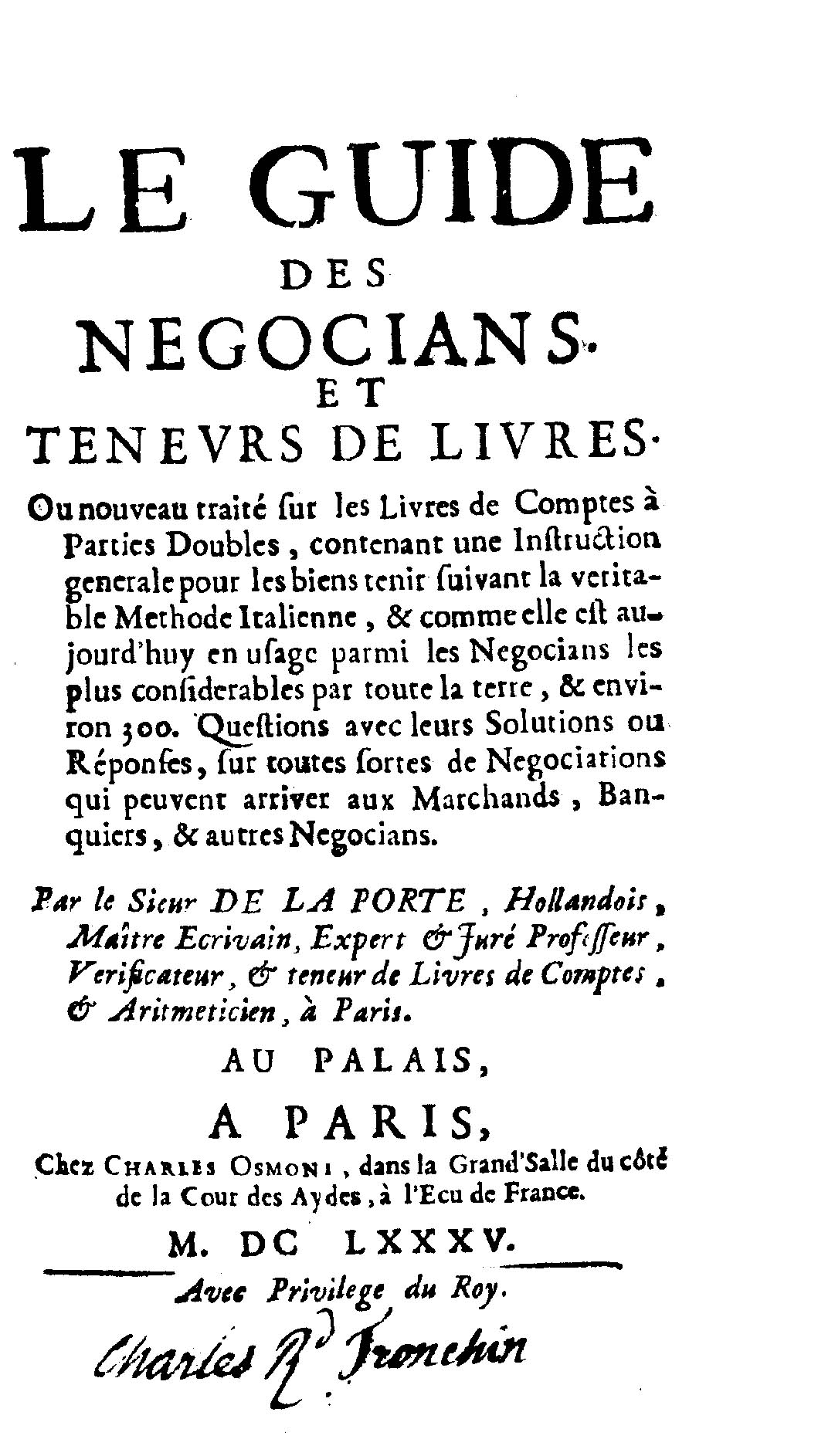
Guide des negocians et teneurs de livres, 1685

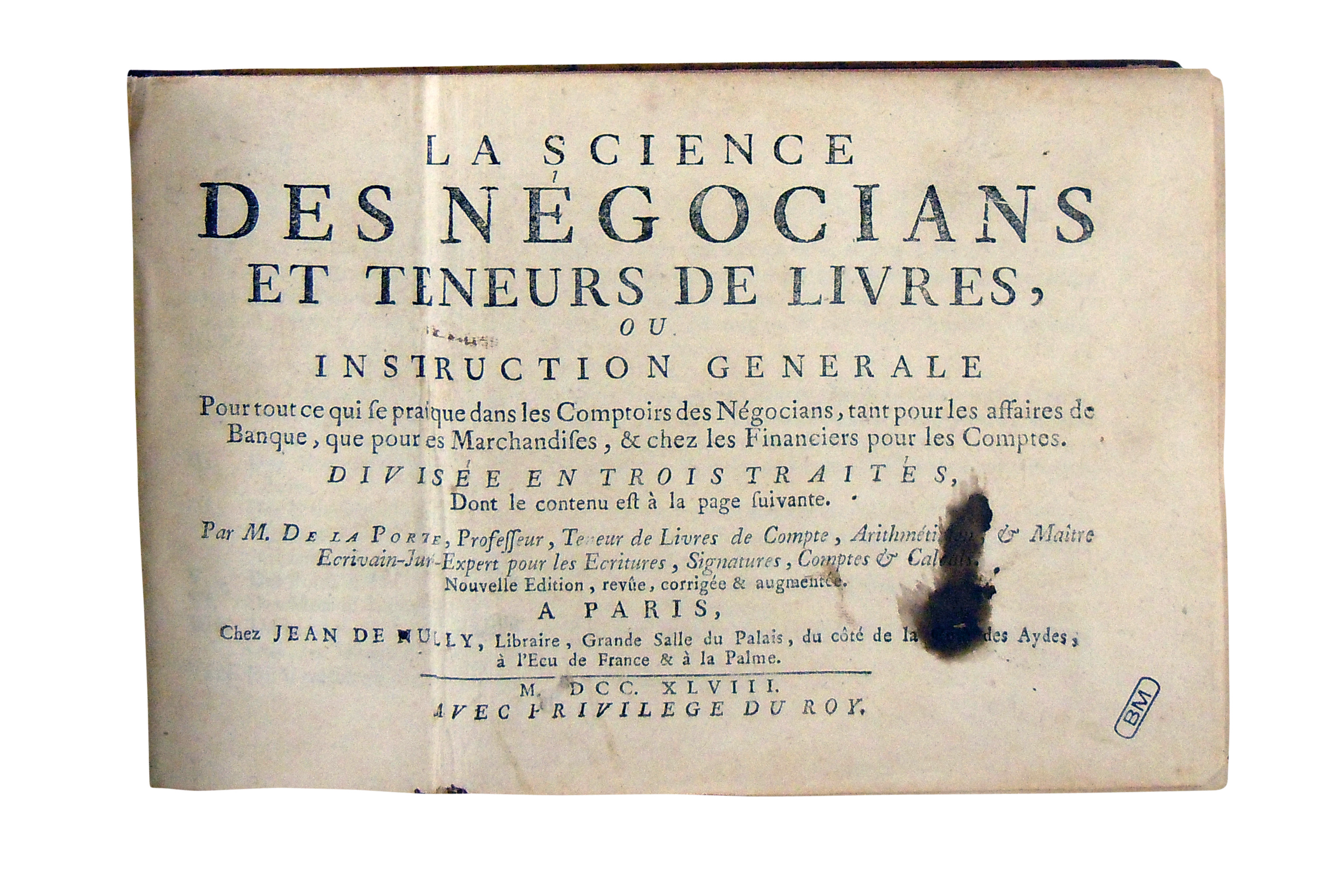
La science des négocians, 1749 (Milano, Fondazione Mansutti).

Mathieu de la Porte (Nijmegen, 17th century - 1722) was a French mathematician.

== Life ==
De la Porte was the son of a French merchant who had moved to the Netherlands. He moved back to France when he was 18 and recanted the Protestant faith. He joined the guild of the "maître écrivain" and taught accounting and arithmetic.

His work "Guide des negocians" is known as one of the most popular books about Double-entry bookkeeping system and had 23 editions between 1685 and 1787.

== Works ==
- La Porte, Mathieu de (1685). Guide des negocians et teneurs de livres, ou Nouveau traité sur les livres de comptes à parties doubles (in French). A Paris: dans la Grand'Salle du coté de la Cour des Aydes chez Charles Osmont.
