= John Meriwether =

American hedge fund executive (born 1947)

John W. Meriwether
- Born: August 10, 1947 (age 79); Chicago, Illinois, United States
- Occupations: Businessman; Financier; Racehorse owner

John William Meriwether (born August 10, 1947) is an American hedge fund executive.

== Education ==
Meriwether earned an undergraduate degree from Northwestern University and an M.B.A. degree from the University of Chicago Booth School of Business.

== Salomon Brothers ==
After graduation, Meriwether moved to New York City, where he worked as a bond trader at Salomon Brothers. At Salomon, Meriwether rose to become the head of the domestic fixed income arbitrage group in the early 1980s and vice-chairman of the company in 1988. In 1991, Salomon was caught in a Treasury securities trading scandal perpetrated by a Meriwether subordinate, Paul Mozer. Meriwether was assessed $50,000 in civil penalties.

== LTCM ==
Meriwether founded the hedge fund Long-Term Capital Management in 1994. The fund collapsed in 1998. The books When Genius Failed: The Rise and Fall of Long-Term Capital Management and Inventing Money: The Story of Long-Term Capital Management and the Legends Behind It detail the events leading up to and following Long-Term Capital Management's demise.

== JWM Partners ==
A year after LTCM's collapse, in 1999, Meriwether founded JWM Partners LLC. The hedge fund opened with $250 million under management and by 2007 had approximately $3 billion. From September 2007 to February 2009, during the Great Recession, his main fund lost 44%. On July 8, 2009, Meriwether closed the fund.

== JM Advisors ==
Meriwether opened his third hedge fund, named JM Advisors Management, in 2010. The fund is expected to use similar strategies as both LTCM and JWM, namely highly leveraged "relative value arbitrage". By March 2011, however, the JM Advisors Macro Fund had raised only $28.85 million.

== Thoroughbred racing ==
Meriwether has been an owner of thoroughbred horses for a number of years and is a member of the board of directors of the New York Racing Association (NYRA). He notably campaigned Buckhan, the winner of the 1993 Washington, D.C. International Stakes.

== See also ==
- List of trading losses
- Liar's Poker
- When Genius Failed
- Black swan problem
