= Roger Lowenstein =

American financial journalist

- Born: Roger Lowenstein; 1954 (age 71–72)
- Education: Cornell University
- Occupations: Non-fiction writer, Journalist
- Writing career
- Notable work: When Genius Failed (2000)

Roger Lowenstein (born 1954) is an American financial journalist and writer. He graduated from Cornell University and reported for The Wall Street Journal for more than a decade, including two years writing its Heard on the Street column, 1989 to 1991. Born in 1954, he is the son of Helen and Louis Lowenstein of Larchmont, New York. Lowenstein is married to Judith Slovin.

He is also a director of Sequoia Fund. In 2016, he joined the board of trustees of Lesley University. His father, the late Louis Lowenstein, was an attorney and Columbia University law professor who wrote books and articles critical of the American financial industry.

His book, Ways and Means: Lincoln and His Cabinet and the Financing of the Civil War, was released on March 8, 2022, and won the 2022 Harold Holzer Lincoln Forum Book Prize.

== Journalism ==
Lowenstein has published seven books, three of them New York Times bestsellers. He has worked at The Wall Street Journal, Smart Money, The New York Times, Fortune, and the Atlantic Monthly. He has also written a number of major articles and cover stories for The New York Times Magazine.

== Books ==
- Buffett: The Making of an American Capitalist, New York: Random House, 1995, ISBN 978-0-679-41584-8
- When Genius Failed: The Rise and Fall of Long-Term Capital Management, New York: Random House, 2000, ISBN 978-0-375-50317-7
- Origins of the Crash: The Great Bubble and Its Undoing, New York: Penguin Press, 2004, ISBN 978-1-59420-003-8
- While America Aged: How Pension Debts Ruined General Motors, Stopped the NYC Subways, Bankrupted San Diego, and Loom as the Next Financial Crisis, Penguin Press HC, May 1, 2008, ISBN 978-1-59420-167-7
- The End of Wall Street, Penguin Press HC, April 6, 2010, ISBN 978-1-59420-549-1
- America's Bank: The Epic Struggle to Create the Federal Reserve, New York: Penguin Press HC, October 20, 2015, ISBN 978-1-59420-239-1
- Ways and Means: Lincoln and His Cabinet and the Financing of the Civil War, New York: Penguin Press HC, March 8, 2022, ISBN 978-0-73522-355-4
