= Admissible trading strategy =

Plan designed to achieve profitable return

In finance, an admissible trading strategy or admissible strategy is any trading strategy with wealth almost surely bounded from below. In particular, an admissible trading strategy precludes unhedged short sales of any unbounded assets. A typical example of a trading strategy which is not admissible is the doubling strategy.

== Mathematical definition ==
=== Discrete time ===
In a market with $d$ assets, a trading strategy $x \in \mathbb{R}^d$ is admissible if $x^T \bar{S} = x^T \frac{S}{1+r}$ is almost surely bounded from below. In the definition let $S$ be the vector of prices, $r$ be the risk-free rate (and therefore $\bar{S}$ is the discounted price).

In a model with more than one time then the wealth process associated with an admissible trading strategy must be uniformly bounded from below.

=== Continuous time ===
Let $S=(S_t)_{t\geq 0}$ be a d-dimensional semimartingale market and $H=(H_t)_{t\geq 0}$ a predictable stochastic process/trading strategy. Then $H$ is called admissible integrand for the semimartingale $S$ or just admissible, if

1. the stochastic integral $H\cdot S$ is well defined.
2. there exists a constant $M\geq 0$ such that $(H\cdot S)_t \geq -M \, a.s., \quad\forall t\geq 0$.
