= Richard Bookstaber =

American author

Richard Michael Bookstaber
- Born: 1950 (age 75–76); Newark, New Jersey, U.S.
- Education: Massachusetts Institute of Technology; Brigham Young University
- Awards: Graham and Dodd Scroll; Roger F. Murray Prize
- Scientific career
- Fields: Finance

Richard Bookstaber (born 1950) is an American financial risk manager and author of A Demon Of Our Own Design, a book highlighting the fragility of the financial system that occurs from tight coupling and complexity. The book is noted for its foreshadowing of the 2008 financial crisis. He is also the author of The End of Theory, which critiques the applicability of economics in dealing with financial crises, and proposes an alternative paradigm using agent-based models.

== Academic career ==
Bookstaber received a B.A. in Economics from Brigham Young University and a Ph.D. from the Massachusetts Institute of Technology.

He held academic positions at Boston University, Brigham Young University, and the Hebrew University of Jerusalem, the last as a Fulbright Scholar. His research focused on option pricing theory, and he wrote an early book in the field.

He has also authored scores of articles on finance topics ranging from option theory to risk management.

== Industry career ==
Bookstaber joined Morgan Stanley in 1985, where he held positions in research and proprietary trading, and was appointed to be the firm's first market risk manager. In 1994 he moved to Salomon Brothers where he was the Managing Director in charge of firmwide risk. Following the purchase of Salomon Brothers by Citigroup he took on risk manager roles in a number of hedge funds, including Moore Capital Management and Bridgewater Associates; and also founded the FrontPoint Partners Quantitative Equities Fund. He also worked at Ziff Brothers Investments doing both risk management and running a quantitative equity portfolio.

Bookstaber co-founded Fabric, a portfolio-design and risk-analysis platform acquired by MSCI in January 2024. He served as managing director and head of risk research at MSCI from January 2024 to March 2025.

== Public sector career ==
Following the publication of A Demon Of Our Own Design, Bookstaber testified a number of times to Congress on issues related to the 2008 financial crisis on topics including derivatives, hedge funds, systemic risk, and risk management.

Beginning in 2009 he took on various number of roles in the U.S. financial regulatory system. Bookstaber worked at the U.S. Securities and Exchange Commission during formulation of the Volcker Rule.

From 2010-2015 he worked at the United States Department of the Treasury as a Senior Policy Advisor to the Financial Stability Oversight Council, and Research Principal at the Office of Financial Research. His research focused on applying agent-based models to assess systemic financial vulnerabilities. His New York Times opinion essays have examined structural changes in the economy and physical sources of financial risk.

Bookstaber served as a chief risk officer of the University of California’s investment office from 2015 to 2020 and returned to the role in 2025.

== Achievement ==
Bookstaber holds a black belt in Brazilian jiu-jitsu and trains at the Renzo Gracie Academy in New York City.

== Book ==
Bookstaber is also the author of A Risk Manifesto: Decisions in the Face of Material Events (Palgrave Macmillan, 2026).
