= Replicating strategy =

In finance, a replicating strategy of a particular financial instrument is a set of liquid, usually exchange-traded assets with the same net profit.
