= Mean reversion (finance) =

Financial term

Mean reversion is a financial term for the assumption that an asset's price will tend to converge to the average price over time.

Using mean reversion as a timing strategy involves both the identification of the trading range for a security and the computation of the average price using quantitative methods. Mean reversion is a phenomenon that can be exhibited in a host of financial time-series data, from price data, earnings data, and book value.

When the current market price is less than the average past price, the security is considered attractive for purchase, with the expectation that the price will rise. When the current market price is above the average past price, the market price is expected to fall. In other words, deviations from the average price are expected to revert to the average. This expectation serves as the cornerstone of multiple trading strategies.

Stock reporting services commonly offer moving averages for periods such as 50 and 100 days. While reporting services provide the averages, identifying the high and low prices for the study period is still necessary.

Mean reversion has the appearance of a more scientific method of choosing stock buy and sell points than charting, because precise numerical values are derived from historical data to identify the buy/sell values, rather than trying to interpret price movements using charts (charting, also known as technical analysis) although the relative strength index (RSI) and average true range (ATR) are nascent attempts to capture such systematic pattern.

Many asset classes, even exchange rates, are observed to be mean reverting; however, this process may last for years and thus is not of value to a short-term investor.

Mean reversion should demonstrate a form of symmetry since a stock may be above its historical average approximately as often as below.

A historical mean reversion model does not need to fully incorporate the actual behavior of a security's price. For example, new information may become available that permanently affects the long-term valuation of an underlying stock. In the case of bankruptcy, it may cease to trade completely and never recover to its former historical average.

In finance, the term "mean reversion" has a slightly different meaning from "return or regression to the mean" in statistics. Jeremy Siegel uses the term "return to the mean" to describe a general principle, a financial time series in which "returns can be very unstable in the short run but very stable in the long run." Quantitatively, it is the standard deviation of average annual returns that declines faster than the inverse of the holding period, implying that the process is not a random walk, but that periods of lower returns are then followed by compensating periods of higher returns, for example in seasonal businesses.

== See also ==
- Regression toward the mean
- Autocorrelation
- Convergence trade
- Cointegration
- Pairs trade
- Ornstein–Uhlenbeck process
- Trend following
- Gambler's fallacy
