= Arbitrage =

Capitalisation of risk-free opportunities in financial markets

Arbitrage (/ˈɑːrbɪtrɑːʒ/, UK also /-trɪdʒ/) is the practice of taking advantage of a difference in prices in two or more markets – striking a combination of matching deals to capitalize on the difference, the profit being the difference between the market prices at which the unit is traded. Arbitrage has the effect of causing prices of the same or very similar assets in different markets to converge.

When used by academics in economics, an arbitrage is a transaction that involves no negative cash flow at any probabilistic or temporal state and a positive cash flow in at least one state; in simple terms, it is the possibility of a risk-free profit after transaction costs. For example, an arbitrage opportunity is present when there is the possibility to instantaneously buy something for a low price and sell it for a higher price.

In principle and in academic use, an arbitrage is risk-free; in common use, as in statistical arbitrage, it may refer to expected profit, though losses may occur, and in practice, there are always risks in arbitrage, some minor (such as fluctuation of prices decreasing profit margins), some major (such as devaluation of a currency or derivative). In academic use, an arbitrage involves taking advantage of differences in price of a single asset or identical cash-flows; in common use, it is also used to refer to differences between similar assets (relative value or convergence trades), as in merger arbitrage.

The term is mainly applied in the financial field. People who engage in arbitrage are called arbitrageurs (/ˌɑːrbɪtrɑːˈʒɜːr/).

== Etymology ==
"Arbitrage" is a French word and denotes a decision by an arbitrator or arbitration tribunal (in modern French, "arbitre" usually means referee or umpire). It was first defined as a financial term in 1704 by French mathematician Mathieu de la Porte in his treatise "La Science des négociants et teneurs de livres" as a consideration of different exchange rates to recognise the most profitable places of issuance and settlement for a bill of exchange ("L'arbitrage est une combinaison que l'on fait de plusieurs changes, pour connoitre [connaître, in modern spelling] quelle place est plus avantageuse pour tirer et remettre".)

== Arbitrage equilibrium ==
If the market prices do not allow for profitable arbitrage, the prices are said to constitute an arbitrage equilibrium, or an arbitrage-free market. An arbitrage equilibrium is a precondition for a general economic equilibrium. The 'no-arbitrage assumption' is used in quantitative finance to calculate a unique risk neutral price for derivatives.

== Arbitrage-free pricing approach for bonds ==
Arbitrage-free pricing for bonds is the method of valuing a coupon-bearing financial instrument by discounting its future cash flows by multiple discount rates. By doing so, a more accurate price can be obtained than if the price is calculated with a present-value pricing approach. Arbitrage-free pricing is used for bond valuation and to detect arbitrage opportunities for investors.

For the purpose of valuing the price of a bond, its cash flows can each be thought of as packets of incremental cash flows with a large packet upon maturity, being the principal. Since the cash flows are dispersed throughout future periods, they must be discounted back to the present. In the present-value approach, the cash flows are discounted with one discount rate to find the price of the bond. In arbitrage-free pricing, multiple discount rates are used.

The present-value approach assumes that the bond yield will stay the same until maturity. This is a simplified model because interest rates may fluctuate in the future, which in turn affects the yield on the bond. For this reason, the discount rate may differ for each cash flow. Each cash flow can be considered a zero-coupon instrument that pays one payment upon maturity. The discount rates used should be the rates of multiple zero-coupon bonds with maturity dates the same as each cash flow and similar risk as the instrument being valued. By using multiple discount rates, the arbitrage-free price is the sum of the discounted cash flows. Arbitrage-free price refers to the price at which no price arbitrage is possible.

The idea of using multiple discount rates obtained from zero-coupon bonds and discounting a similar bond's cash flow to find its price is derived from the yield curve, which is a curve of the yields of the same bond with different maturities. This curve can be used to view trends in market expectations of how interest rates will move in the future. In arbitrage-free pricing of a bond, a yield curve of similar zero-coupon bonds with different maturities is created. If the curve were to be created with Treasury securities of different maturities, they would be stripped of their coupon payments through bootstrapping. This is to transform the bonds into zero-coupon bonds. The yield of these zero-coupon bonds would then be plotted on a diagram with time on the x-axis and yield on the y-axis.

Since the yield curve displays market expectations on how yields and interest rates may move, the arbitrage-free pricing approach is more realistic than using only one discount rate. Investors can use this approach to value bonds and find price mismatches, resulting in an arbitrage opportunity. If a bond valued with the arbitrage-free pricing approach turns out to be priced higher in the market, an investor could have such an opportunity:

1. Investor shorts the bond at price at time t_{1}.
2. Investor longs the zero-coupon bonds making up the related yield curve and strips and sells any coupon payments at t_{1}.
3. As t approaches t_{1}, the price spread between the prices will decrease.
4. At maturity, the prices will converge and be equal. Investor exits both the long and short positions, realising a profit.

If the outcome from the valuation were the reverse case, the opposite positions would be taken in the bonds. This arbitrage opportunity comes from the assumption that the prices of bonds with the same properties will converge upon maturity. This can be explained through market efficiency, which states that arbitrage opportunities will eventually be discovered and corrected. The prices of the bonds in t_{1} move closer together to finally become the same at t_{T}.

== Conditions for arbitrage ==
Arbitrage may take place when:

- the same asset does not trade at the same price on all markets ("the law of one price").
- two assets with identical cash flows do not trade at the same price.
- an asset with a known price in the future does not today trade at its future price discounted at the risk-free interest rate (or the asset has significant costs of storage; so this condition holds true for something like grain but not for securities).

Arbitrage is not simply the act of buying a product in one market and selling it in another for a higher price at some later time. The transactions must occur simultaneously to avoid exposure to market risk, or the risk that prices may change in one market before both transactions are complete. In practical terms, this is generally possible only with securities and financial products that can be traded electronically, and even then, when each leg of the trade is executed, the prices in the market may have moved. Missing one of the legs of the trade (and subsequently having to trade it soon after at a worse price) is an 'execution risk' referred to as 'leg risk'.

In the simplest example, any good sold in one market should sell for the same price in another. Traders may, for example, find that the price of wheat is lower in agricultural regions than in cities, purchase the good, and transport it to another region to sell at a higher price. This type of price arbitrage is the most common, but this simple example ignores the cost of transport, storage, risk, and other factors. "True" arbitrage requires that there is no market risk involved. Where securities are traded on more than one exchange, arbitrage occurs by simultaneously buying in one and selling on the other.

See rational pricing, particularly § arbitrage mechanics, for further discussion.

Mathematically it is defined as follows:

$$P(V_t \geq 0) = 1 \text{ and } P(V_t \neq 0) > 0, \,0<t\le T$$

where $V_0 = 0$, $V_t$ denotes the portfolio value at time t and T is the time the portfolio ceases to be available on the market. This means that the value of the portfolio is never negative, and guaranteed to be positive at least once over its lifetime.

Negative, or anti-, arbitrage is similarly defined as

$$P(V_t \leq 0) = 1 \text{ and } P(V_t \neq 0) > 0, \,0<t\le T$$

and occurs naturally in arbitrage relations as the seller view as opposed to the buyer view.

== Price convergence ==
Arbitrage has the effect of causing prices, and thus purchasing power, in different markets to converge. As a result of arbitrage, the currency exchange rates and the prices of securities and other financial assets in different markets tend to converge. The speed at which they do so is a measure of market efficiency. Arbitrage tends to reduce price discrimination by encouraging people to buy an item where the price is low and resell it where the price is high (as long as the buyers are not prohibited from reselling and the transaction costs of buying, holding, and reselling are small, relative to the difference in prices in the different markets).

Arbitrage moves different currencies toward purchasing power parity. Assume that a car purchased in the United States is cheaper than the same car in Canada. Canadians would go cross-border shopping, buying their cars across the border to exploit the arbitrage condition. At the same time, Americans would buy US cars, transport them across the border, then sell them in Canada. Canadians would have to buy American dollars to buy the cars and Americans would have to sell the Canadian dollars they received in exchange. Both actions would increase demand for US dollars and supply of Canadian dollars. As a result, there would be an appreciation of the US currency. This would make US cars more expensive and Canadian cars less so until their prices were similar. On a larger scale, international arbitrage opportunities in commodities, goods, securities, and currencies tend to change exchange rates until the purchasing power is equal.

In reality, most assets exhibit some difference between countries. These, transaction costs, taxes, and other costs provide an impediment to this kind of arbitrage. Similarly, arbitrage affects the difference in interest rates paid on government bonds issued by the various countries, given the expected depreciation in the currencies relative to each other (see interest rate parity).

== Risks ==
Arbitrage transactions in modern securities markets involve fairly low day-to-day risks, but can face extremely high risk in rare situations, particularly financial crises, and can lead to bankruptcy. Formally, arbitrage transactions have negative skew – prices can get a small amount closer, while they can get very far apart. The day-to-day risks are generally small because the transactions involve small differences in price, so an execution failure will generally cause a small loss (unless the trade is very big or the price moves rapidly). The rare case risks are extremely high because these small price differences are converted to large profits via leverage (borrowed money), and in the rare event of a large price move, this may yield a large loss.

The principal risk, which is typically encountered on a routine basis, is classified as execution risk. This transpires when an aspect of the financial transaction does not materialize as anticipated. Infrequent, albeit critical, risks encompass counterparty and liquidity risks. The former, counterparty risk, is characterized by the failure of the other participant in a substantial transaction, or a series of transactions, to fulfill their financial obligations. Liquidity risk, conversely, emerges when an entity is necessitated to allocate additional monetary resources as margin, but encounters a deficit in the required capital.

In the academic literature, the idea that seemingly very low-risk arbitrage trades might not be fully exploited because of these risk factors and other considerations is often referred to as limits to arbitrage.

=== Example ===
In perhaps the best known example, the American firm Long-Term Capital Management (LTCM) fell victim to limits to arbitrage in August 1998. The company was highly leveraged, and had staked its investments on the convergence of the prices of certain bonds in the long run. However, in the short run, due to the 1997 Asian financial crisis and the Russian government's debt default, panicked investors traded against LTCM's position, and the prices that had been expected to converge were, instead, driven further apart. This caused LTCM to face margin calls. Because the firm lacked the available funds to cover these calls, it was compelled to close out its positions and to take great losses. Due to the potential for a large shock should LTCM fail, the Federal Reserve Bank facilitated a bailout.

=== Execution risk ===
Generally, it is impossible to close two or three transactions at the same instant; therefore, there is the possibility that when one part of the deal is closed, a quick shift in prices makes it impossible to close the other at a profitable price. However, this is not necessarily the case. Many exchanges and inter-dealer brokers allow multi legged trades (e.g. basis block trades on LIFFE).

Competition in the marketplace can also create risks during arbitrage transactions. As an example, if one was trying to profit from a price discrepancy between IBM on the NYSE and IBM on the London Stock Exchange, they may purchase a large number of shares on the NYSE and find that they cannot simultaneously sell on the LSE. This leaves the arbitrageur in an unhedged risk position.

In the 1980s, risk arbitrage was common. In this form of speculation, one trades a security that is clearly undervalued or overvalued, when it is seen that the wrong valuation is about to be corrected. The standard example is the stock of a company, undervalued in the stock market, which is about to be the object of a takeover bid; the price of the takeover will more truly reflect the value of the company, giving a large profit to those who bought at the current price, if the merger goes through as predicted. Traditionally, arbitrage transactions in the securities markets involve high speed, high volume, and low risk. At some moment a price difference exists, and the problem is to execute two or three balancing transactions while the difference persists (that is, before the other arbitrageurs act). When the transaction involves a delay of weeks or months, as above, it may entail considerable risk if borrowed money is used to magnify the reward through leverage. One way of reducing this risk is through the illegal use of inside information, and risk arbitrage in leveraged buyouts was associated with some of the famous financial scandals of the 1980s, such as those involving Michael Milken and Ivan Boesky.

=== Mismatch ===
Another risk occurs if the items being bought and sold are not identical and the arbitrage is conducted under the assumption that the prices of the items are correlated or predictable; this is more narrowly referred to as a convergence trade. In the extreme case this is merger arbitrage, described below. In comparison to the classical quick arbitrage transaction, such an operation can produce disastrous losses.

=== Counterparty risk ===
As arbitrages generally involve future movements of cash, they are subject to counterparty risk: the risk that a counterparty fails to fulfill their side of a transaction. This is a serious problem if one has either a single trade or many related trades with a single counterparty, whose failure thus poses a threat, or in the event of a financial crisis when many counterparties fail. This hazard is serious because of the large quantities one must trade in order to make a profit on small price differences.

For example, if one purchases many risky bonds, then hedges them with CDSes, profiting from the difference between the bond spread and the CDS premium, in a financial crisis, the bonds may default and the CDS writer/seller may fail, due to the stress of the crisis, causing the arbitrageur to face steep losses.

=== Liquidity risk ===
Arbitrage trades are necessarily synthetic, leveraged trades, as they involve a short position. If the assets used are not identical (so a price divergence makes the trade temporarily lose money), or the margin treatment is not identical, and the trader is accordingly required to post margin (faces a margin call), the trader may run out of capital (if they run out of cash and cannot borrow more) and be forced to sell these assets at a loss even though the trades may be expected to ultimately make money. In effect, arbitrage traders synthesise a put option on their ability to finance themselves.

Prices may diverge during a financial crisis, often termed a "flight to quality"; these are precisely the times when it is hardest for leveraged investors to raise capital (due to overall capital constraints), and thus they will lack capital precisely when they need it most.

=== Gray market ===
Grey market arbitrage is the sale of goods purchased through informal channels to earn the difference in price. Excessive gray market arbitrage will lead to arbitrage behaviors in formal channels, which will reduce returns due to factors such as price confusion, and may even cause prices to plummet in severe cases.

== Types ==
=== Spatial arbitrage ===
Also known as geographical arbitrage, this is the simplest form of arbitrage. In spatial arbitrage, an arbitrageur looks for price differences between geographically separate markets. For example, there may be a bond dealer in Virginia offering a bond at 100-12/23 and a dealer in Washington bidding 100-15/23 for the same bond. For whatever reason, the two dealers have not spotted the difference in the prices, but the arbitrageur does. The arbitrageur immediately buys the bond from the Virginia dealer and sells it to the Washington dealer.

=== Crypto arbitrage ===
Also known as interexchange arbitrage, this is the form of arbitrage that takes advantage of the difference between two or more crypto exchanges. For example, on HTX token like LSK could be priced at $1.39 while on Gate it could be sold for $1.5. Although there are some risks involved in that type of arbitrage, such as network and exchange fees, blockchain overload, and inability to deposit or withdraw funds, this activity remains one of the most profitable ventures in crypto.

=== Atomic arbitrage (Crypto) ===
Atomic arbitrage takes advantage of price discrepancies between assets being sold on decentralized exchanges. Consider two exchanges, (E.g. uniswap and pancakeswap) providing markets for the same asset on the Ethereum blockchain. One pool might be selling the asset for $9.66, and the other is selling it for $9.67. With other types of arbitrage, the risk involved might not be worth the $0.01 profit. But with a smart contract, arbitrageurs can make their activity atomic: if any transactions fail, all of the transactions in the bundle are reverted for no cost. These riskless market dynamics provide for an extremely competitive playing field, with some bots taking on million dollar swaps for only a few dollars in profit. As of 2022, over $270 million dollars in profit had been extracted by atomic arbitrage bots on Ethereum alone.

=== Latency arbitrage ===
For very short amounts of time, the prices of two assets that are either fungible or related by a strict pricing relationship may temporarily go out of sync as the market makers are slow to update the prices. This momentary mispricing creates the opportunity for an arbitrageur to capture the difference between the two prices. For example, the price of calls and puts on an underlying should be related by put-call parity. If these prices are misquoted relative to the put-call parity relationship, it provides an arbitrageur the opportunity to profit from the mispricing.

Latency arbitrage is often mentioned especially in electronic processing in the financial field, where the use of fast server hardware allows an arbitrageur to realize opportunities that may exist for as little as nanoseconds. A study by the Financial Conduct Authority of the United Kingdom found that this practice generates as much as $5 billion per year in profit.

=== Merger arbitrage ===
Also called risk arbitrage, merger arbitrage generally consists of buying/holding the stock of a company that is the target of a takeover while shorting the stock of the acquiring company.

Usually, the market price of the target company is less than the price offered by the acquiring company. The spread between these two prices depends mainly on the probability and the timing of the takeover being completed as well as the prevailing level of interest rates.

The bet in a merger arbitrage is that such a spread will eventually be zero, if and when the takeover is completed. The risk is that the deal "breaks" and the spread massively widens.

=== Municipal bond arbitrage ===
Municipal bond arbitrage, also called municipal bond relative value arbitrage, municipal arbitrage, or just muni arb, is a hedge fund strategy involving one of two approaches. The term "arbitrage" is also used in the context of the Income Tax Regulations governing the investment of proceeds of municipal bonds; these regulations, aimed at the issuers or beneficiaries of tax-exempt municipal bonds, are different and, instead, attempt to remove the issuer's ability to arbitrage between the low tax-exempt rate and a taxable investment rate.

Generally, managers seek relative value opportunities by being both long and short municipal bonds with a duration-neutral book. The relative value trades may be between different issuers, different bonds issued by the same entity, or capital structure trades referencing the same asset (in the case of revenue bonds). Managers aim to capture the inefficiencies arising from the heavy participation of non-economic investors (i.e., high income "buy and hold" investors seeking tax-exempt income) as well as the "crossover buying" arising from corporations' or individuals' changing income tax situations (i.e., insurers switching their munis for corporates after a large loss as they can capture a higher after-tax yield by offsetting the taxable corporate income with underwriting losses). There are additional inefficiencies arising from the highly fragmented nature of the municipal bond market which has two million outstanding issues and 50,000 issuers, in contrast to the Treasury market which has 400 issues and a single issuer.

Second, managers construct leveraged portfolios of AAA- or AA-rated tax-exempt municipal bonds with the duration risk hedged by shorting the appropriate ratio of taxable corporate bonds. These corporate equivalents are typically interest rate swaps referencing Libor or SIFMA. The arbitrage manifests itself in the form of a relatively cheap longer maturity municipal bond, which is a municipal bond that yields significantly more than 65% of a corresponding taxable corporate bond. The steeper slope of the municipal yield curve allows participants to collect more after-tax income from the municipal bond portfolio than is spent on the interest rate swap; the carry is greater than the hedge expense. Positive, tax-free carry from muni arb can reach into the double digits. The bet in this municipal bond arbitrage is that, over a longer period of time, two similar instruments—municipal bonds and interest rate swaps—will correlate with each other; they are both very high quality credits, have the same maturity and are denominated in the same currency. Credit risk and duration risk are largely eliminated in this strategy. However, basis risk arises from use of an imperfect hedge, which results in significant, but range-bound principal volatility. The end goal is to limit this principal volatility, eliminating its relevance over time as the high, consistent, tax-free cash flow accumulates. Since the inefficiency is related to government tax policy, and hence is structural in nature, it has not been arbitraged away.

However, many municipal bonds are callable, and this adds substantial risks to the strategy.

=== Convertible bond arbitrage ===
A convertible bond is a bond that an investor can return to the issuing company in exchange for a predetermined number of shares in the company.

A convertible bond can be thought of as a corporate bond with a stock call option attached to it.

The price of a convertible bond is sensitive to three major factors:

- interest rate. When rates move higher, the bond part of a convertible bond tends to move lower, but the call option part of a convertible bond moves higher (and the aggregate tends to move lower).
- stock price. When the price of the stock the bond is convertible into moves higher, the price of the bond tends to rise.
- credit spread. If the creditworthiness of the issuer deteriorates (e.g. rating downgrade) and its credit spread widens, the bond price tends to move lower, but, in many cases, the call option part of the convertible bond moves higher (since credit spread correlates with volatility).

Given the complexity of the calculations involved and the convoluted structure that a convertible bond can have, an arbitrageur often relies on sophisticated quantitative models in order to identify bonds that are trading cheap versus their theoretical value.

Convertible arbitrage consists of buying a convertible bond and hedging two of the three factors in order to gain exposure to the third factor at a very attractive price.

For instance an arbitrageur would first buy a convertible bond, then sell fixed income securities or interest rate futures (to hedge the interest rate exposure) and buy some credit protection (to hedge the risk of credit deterioration). Eventually what he or she would be left with is something similar to a call option on the underlying stock, acquired at a very low price. He or she could then make money either selling some of the more expensive options that are openly traded in the market or delta hedging his or her exposure to the underlying shares.

=== Depository receipts ===
A depositary receipt is a security that is offered as a "tracking stock" on another foreign market. For instance, a Chinese company wishing to raise more money may issue a depository receipt on the New York Stock Exchange, as the amount of capital on the local exchanges is limited. These securities, known as ADRs (American depositary receipt) or GDRs (global depository receipt) depending on where they are issued, are typically considered "foreign" and therefore trade at a lower value when first released. Many ADR's are exchangeable into the original security (known as fungibility) and actually have the same value. In this case, there is a spread between the perceived value and real value, which can be extracted. Other ADR's that are not exchangeable often have much larger spreads. Since the ADR is trading at a value lower than what it is worth, one can purchase the ADR and expect to make money as its value converges on the original. However, there is a chance that the original stock will fall in value too, so by shorting it one can hedge that risk.

=== Cross-border arbitrage ===
Cross-border arbitrage exploits different prices of the same stock in different countries:

Example: Apple is trading on NASDAQ at US$108.84. The stock is also traded on the German electronic exchange, XETRA. If 1 euro costs US$1.11, a cross-border trader could enter a buy order on the XETRA at €98.03 per Apple share and a sell order at €98.07 per share.

Some brokers in Germany do not offer access to the U.S. exchanges. Hence if a German retail investor wants to buy Apple stock, he needs to buy it on the XETRA. The cross-border trader would sell the Apple shares on XETRA to the investor and buy the shares in the same second on NASDAQ. Afterwards, the cross-border trader would need to transfer the shares bought on NASDAQ to the German XETRA exchange, where he is obliged to deliver the stock.

=== Dual-listed companies ===
A dual-listed company (DLC) structure involves two companies incorporated in different countries contractually agreeing to operate their businesses as if they were a single enterprise, while retaining their separate legal identity and existing stock exchange listings. In integrated and efficient financial markets, stock prices of the twin pair should move in lockstep. In practice, DLC share prices exhibit large deviations from theoretical parity. Arbitrage positions in DLCs can be set up by obtaining a long position in the relatively underpriced part of the DLC and a short position in the relatively overpriced part. Such arbitrage strategies start paying off as soon as the relative prices of the two DLC stocks converge toward theoretical parity. However, since there is no identifiable date at which DLC prices will converge, arbitrage positions sometimes have to be kept open for considerable periods of time. In the meantime, the price gap might widen. In these situations, arbitrageurs may receive margin calls, after which they would most likely be forced to liquidate part of the position at a highly unfavorable moment and suffer a loss. Arbitrage in DLCs may be profitable, but is also very risky.

A good illustration of the risk of DLC arbitrage is the position in Royal Dutch Shell—which had a DLC structure until 2005—by the hedge fund Long-Term Capital Management (LTCM, see also the discussion below). Lowenstein (2000) describes that LTCM established an arbitrage position in Royal Dutch Shell in the summer of 1997, when Royal Dutch traded at an 8 to 10 percent premium. In total, $2.3 billion was invested, half of which was long in Shell and the other half was short in Royal Dutch (Lowenstein, p. 99). In the autumn of 1998, large defaults on Russian debt created significant losses for the hedge fund and LTCM had to unwind several positions. Lowenstein reports that the premium of Royal Dutch had increased to about 22 percent and LTCM had to close the position and incur a loss. According to Lowenstein (p. 234), LTCM lost $286 million in equity pairs trading and more than half of this loss is accounted for by the Royal Dutch Shell trade. (See further under Limits to arbitrage.)

=== Private to public equities ===
The market prices for privately held companies are typically viewed from a return on investment perspective (such as 25%), whilst publicly held and or exchange listed companies trade on a price to earnings ratio (P/E) (such as a P/E of 10, which equates to a 10% return on investment (ROI)). Thus, if a publicly traded company specialises in the acquisition of privately held companies, from a per-share perspective there is a gain with every acquisition that falls within these guidelines. E.g., Berkshire Hathaway. Private to public equities arbitrage is a term that can arguably be applied to investment banking in general. Private markets to public markets differences may also help explain the overnight windfall gains enjoyed by principals of companies that just did an initial public offering (IPO).

=== Regulatory arbitrage ===
Regulatory arbitrage "is an avoidance strategy of regulation that is exercised as a result of a regulatory inconsistency". In other words, where a regulated institution takes advantage of the difference between its real (or economic) risk and the regulatory position. For example, if a bank, operating under the Basel I accord, has to hold 8% capital against default risk, but the real risk of default is lower, it is profitable to securitise the loan, removing the low-risk loan from its portfolio. On the other hand, if the real risk is higher than the regulatory risk then it is profitable to make that loan and hold on to it, provided it is priced appropriately. Regulatory arbitrage can result in parts of entire businesses being unregulated as a result of the arbitrage.

This process can increase the overall riskiness of institutions under a risk insensitive regulatory regime, as described by Alan Greenspan in his October 1998 speech on The Role of Capital in Optimal Banking Supervision and Regulation.

The term "Regulatory Arbitrage" was used for the first time in 2005 when it was applied by Scott V. Simpson, a partner at law firm Skadden, Arps, to refer to a new defence tactic in hostile mergers and acquisitions where differing takeover regimes in deals involving multi-jurisdictions are exploited to the advantage of a target company under threat.

In economics, regulatory arbitrage (sometimes, tax arbitrage) may refer to situations when a company can choose a nominal place of business with a regulatory, legal or tax regime with lower costs. This can occur particularly where the business transaction has no obvious physical location. In the case of many financial products, it may be unclear "where" the transaction occurs.

Regulatory arbitrage can include restructuring a bank by outsourcing services such as IT. The outsourcing company takes over the installations, buying out the bank's assets and charges a periodic service fee back to the bank. This frees up cashflow usable for new lending by the bank. The bank will have higher IT costs, but counts on the multiplier effect of money creation and the interest rate spread to make it a profitable exercise.

Example: Suppose the bank sells its IT installations for US$40 million. With a reserve ratio of 10%, the bank can create US$400 million in additional loans (there is a time lag, and the bank has to expect to recover the loaned money back into its books). The bank can often lend (and securitize the loan) to the IT services company to cover the acquisition cost of the IT installations. This can be at preferential rates, as the sole client using the IT installation is the bank. If the bank can generate 5% interest margin on the 400 million of new loans, the bank will increase interest revenues by 20 million. The IT services company is free to leverage their balance sheet as aggressively as they and their banker agree to. This is the reason behind the trend towards outsourcing in the financial sector. Without this money creation benefit, it is actually more expensive to outsource the IT operations as the outsourcing adds a layer of management and increases overhead.

According to PBS Frontline's 2012 four-part documentary, "Money, Power, and Wall Street", regulatory arbitrage, along with asymmetric bank lobbying in Washington and abroad, allowed investment banks in the pre- and post-2008 period to continue to skirt laws and engage in the risky proprietary trading of opaque derivatives, swaps, and other credit-based instruments invented to circumvent legal restrictions at the expense of clients, government, and publics.

Due to the Affordable Care Act's expansion of Medicaid coverage, one form of Regulatory Arbitrage can now be found when businesses engage in "Medicaid Migration", a maneuver by which qualifying employees who would typically be enrolled in company health plans elect to enroll in Medicaid instead. These programs that have similar characteristics as insurance products to the employee, but have radically different cost structures, resulting in significant expense reductions for employers.

=== Telecom arbitrage ===
Telecom arbitrage companies allow phone users to make international calls for free through certain access numbers. Such services are offered in the United Kingdom; the telecommunication arbitrage companies get paid an interconnect charge by the UK mobile networks and then buy international routes at a lower cost. The calls are seen as free by the UK contract mobile phone customers since they are using up their allocated monthly minutes rather than paying for additional calls.

Such services were previously offered in the United States by companies such as FuturePhone.com. These services would operate in rural telephone exchanges, primarily in small towns in the state of Iowa. In these areas, the local telephone carriers are allowed to charge a high "termination fee" to the caller's carrier in order to fund the cost of providing service to the small and sparsely populated areas that they serve. However, FuturePhone (as well as other similar services) ceased operations upon legal challenges from AT&T and other service providers.

=== Statistical arbitrage ===
Statistical arbitrage is an imbalance in expected nominal values. A casino has a statistical arbitrage in every game of chance that it offers, referred to as the house advantage, house edge, vigorish, or house vigorish.

=== Grey market ===
Grey market arbitrage involves buying items through marketing channels that don't have the permission of the trademark owner and sells them in the legitimate market.

The luxury watch market is an example of a grey market. A Swiss watch may be sold by an approved dealer for one price, but a customer may buy the same watch for a different price through unauthorized channels.

== See also ==
=== Types of financial arbitrage ===
- Arbitrage betting – Bets taking advantage of differing odds
- Covered interest arbitrage – Foreign exchange market
- Fixed income arbitrage – Arbitrage exploiting differing interest rates
- Global labor arbitrage – Shift of jobs to more inexpensive nations
- Political arbitrage
- Options arbitrage
- Risk arbitrage – Investment strategy
- Statistical arbitrage – Short-term financial trading strategy
- Triangular arbitrage – Forex arbitrage across three currencies
- Uncovered interest arbitrage – Trading strategy
- Volatility arbitrage – Type of financial arbitrage

=== Related concepts ===
- Airline booking ploys – Flying cheaply by evading airline rules
- Algorithmic trading – Method of executing orders
- Arbitrage pricing theory – Asset pricing theory
- Coherence (philosophical gambling strategy), analogous concept in Bayesian probability
- Cointelation
- Drop shipping – Supply chain management method
- Efficient-market hypothesis – Economic theory that asset prices fully reflect all available information
- Immunization (finance) – Strategy to minimize effects of changes in interest rates
- Interest rate parity – No-arbitrage equilibrium state
- Intermediation – Third party that offers intermediation services between two parties
- No free lunch with vanishing risk – Concept in mathematical finance
- TANSTAAFL – Adage of the impossibility of getting something for nothing
- Ticket resale – Act of reselling tickets for admission to events
- Value investing – Investment paradigm
