= List of John Jay Award recipients =

Columbia College alumni award

The John Jay Award is presented annually by Columbia College of Columbia University to its alumni for distinguished professional achievement. It is named for Founding Father of the United States John Jay, Columbia College Class of 1764. The first awards were handed out in 1979.

As of 2020, the awards have been presented to 220 honorees.

Notable former recipients are shown below and are grouped in cohorts by the decade when they received the award. The list of recipients include many well-known professionals in a wide variety of fields. Among the recipients are eight Pulitzer Prize winners, five Nobel Prize laureates, five Tony Award winners, five billionaires, four Academy Awards winners, three Golden Globe Awards winners, two United States Attorneys General, a President of Estonia, a Chairman of the Federal Reserve, an administrator of the National Aerospace Development Administration, a United States Secretary of Defense, a Senator of the United States, and numerous other accomplished businessmen, journalists, politicians, athletes, playwrights, and literary figures.

== 1979–1989 ==
1979

- Roone Arledge (1952), former president of ABC News and winner of 36 Emmys; creator of 20/20, Nightline, Monday Night Football, ABC World News Tonight and Primetime
- James C. Fletcher (1940), president of the University of Utah and administrator of the National Aeronautics and Space Administration
- Max Frankel (1952), Pulitzer Prize winning executive editor of The New York Times
- Mark N. Kaplan (1951), CEO of Drexel Burnham Lambert and Engelhard
- Arthur Levitt Sr. (1921), longest-serving New York State Comptroller; father of Arthur Levitt, Chairman of the United States Securities and Exchange Commission
- Franklin A. Thomas (1956), former president of The Ford Foundation

1980

- Harold Brown (1945), U.S. Secretary of Defense and president of the California Institute of Technology
- Emanuel Ax (1970), Grammy Award-winning concert pianist

1981

- Sidney Sheinberg (1955), head of MCA Inc. and Universal Pictures
- George Segal (1955), star of Who's Afraid of Virginia Woolf?, Ship of Fools and Just Shoot Me!, winner of the Golden Globe Award for New Star of the Year – Actor in 1965 and Golden Globe Award for Best Actor – Motion Picture Musical or Comedy in 1973
- Armand Hammer (1919), philanthropist, chairman of Occidental Petroleum, namesake of Hammer Museum and Armand Hammer United World College of the American West, great-grandfather of actor Armie Hammer
- Robert F. Blumofe (1930), producer of Bound for Glory, nominated for the Academy Award for Best Picture
- S. Marshall Kempner (1919), American investment banker and founder of Bank of the West, brother-in-law of Peggy Guggenheim

1982

- Morris Schapiro (1923), American investment banker, grandfather of painter Jacob Collins '86 and brother of art historian Meyer Schapiro '24
- Martin Meyerson (1942), president of the University of Pennsylvania
- John Kluge (1937), billionaire, chairman and founder of Metromedia; America's richest person from 1989–1990; namesake of the John W. Kluge Center and Kluge Prize at the Library of Congress

1983

- George Starke (1971), offensive lineman for the Washington Redskins
- Joseph Kraft (1947), American journalist and speechwriter for John F. Kennedy
- Lawrence K. Grossman (1952), president of PBS from 1976 to 1984 and NBC News from 1985 to 1988
- Robert Neil Butler (1949), president of the International Longevity Center and winner of the Pulitzer Prize for General Nonfiction
- Arthur F. Burns (1925), Chairman of the Federal Reserve and U.S. Ambassador to West Germany

1984

- Emanuel Papper (1935), anesthesiologist, dean of the Miller School of Medicine at the University of Miami, from 1969 to 1981
- Luis J. Lauredo (1972), United States Ambassador to the Organization of American States from 2000 to 2001, executive director of the 1st Summit of the Americas and national coordinator of the 3rd Summit of the Americas
- Richard Goodwin Capen, Jr. (1956), former publisher of the Miami Herald and the United States Ambassador to Spain from 1992 to 1993

1985

- Art Garfunkel (1965), singer of Simon and Garfunkel, famous for the song The Sound of Silence
- Leon Cooper (1951), winner of the Nobel Prize in Physics in 1972
- Harvey M. Krueger (1951), former CEO of Kuhn, Loeb & Co. and vice chairman of Lehman Brothers

1986

- Alfred Lerner (1955), American billionaire, chairman of MBNA Bank and ex-owner of the Cleveland Browns, namesake of Columbia University's Alfred Lerner Hall
- George Jaffin (1924), attorney and philanthropist; major patron of Yaacov Agam
- Morton Halperin (1958), Deputy Assistant Secretary of Defense, Director of Policy Planning for the U.S. State Department, and member of Richard Nixon's Enemies List
- Brian Dennehy (1960), winner of the Tony Award and the Golden Globe Award for Best Actor – Miniseries or Television Film for Death of a Salesman

1987

- Archie Roberts (1965), former football player for the Miami Dolphins and cardiac surgeon
- Alvin F. Poussaint (1956), professor of psychiatry and dean of freshmen at Harvard Medical School
- Robert Kraft (1963), American billionaire, chairman and CEO of The Kraft Group; owner of the New England Patriots
- Hugh H. Bownes (1941), judge of the United States Court of Appeals for the First Circuit

1988

- Michael Heidelberger (1909), immunologist, "father of modern immunology"
- Jason Epstein (1949), editorial director of Random House and co-founder of the New York Review of Books
- Edward N. Costikyan (1947), Democratic Party politician and reformer who oversaw the dismantling of Tammany Hall; partner at Paul, Weiss, Rifkind, Wharton & Garrison
- Alan N. Cohen (1952), former co-owner of the Boston Celtics and the Brooklyn Nets; former chairman and CEO of the Madison Square Garden Corporation
- Douglas H. McCorkindale (1961), former chairman and CEO of Gannett

1989

- Lawrence E. Walsh (1932), independent counsel in the Iran–Contra affair; 4th United States Deputy Attorney General
- Melvin Schwartz (1953), winner of the Nobel Prize in Physics in 1988
- Frank Lorenzo (1961), former chairman of Eastern Airlines, Texas Air Corporation and Texas International Airlines
- Brian De Palma (1962), director of Scarface, The Untouchables and Carrie
- Ted de Bary (1941), East Asian studies expert and provost of Columbia University
- Allen Rosenshine (1959), founder of the Omnicom Group, former chairman and CEO of BBDO

== 1990–1999 ==
1990

- Jeremiah Stamler (1940), epidemiologist, expert in the field of preventive cardiology, professor emeritus at Northwestern University
- Sid Luckman (1939), NFL Hall of Fame Chicago Bears quarterback
- Daniel Edelman (1940), founder of the world's largest public relations firm Edelman
- Mortimer Adler* (1923), philosopher and Great Books pioneer

1991

- Robert A. M. Stern (1960), traditionalist architect, dean of the Yale School of Architecture, designer of 15 Central Park West, 30 Park Place, 520 Park Avenue, 220 Central Park South, Comcast Center in Philadelphia, Mandarin Oriental, Atlanta, Tour Carpe Diem in Paris, the George W. Bush Presidential Center, and two new residential colleges of Yale University.
- Norman Foster Ramsey Jr. (1935), winner of the Nobel Prize in Physics
- William Campbell (1962), chairman of the board of Intuit, former board director of Apple Inc.; founder of Claris
- José A. Cabranes (1961), judge of the U.S. Court of Appeals; first Puerto Rican to sit in a U.S. District Court; current Trustee of Columbia University
- Gedale B. Horowitz (1953), former executive committee member of Salomon Brothers, founding chairman of the Municipal Securities Rulemaking Board

1992

- Russell F. Warren (1962), surgeon-in-chief of the Hospital for Special Surgery from 1993 to 2003 and team doctor for the New York Giants
- Terrence McNally (1960), Tony Award-winning playwright; author of Kiss of the Spider Woman and Ragtime (musical)
- Richard Axel (1967), winner of the Nobel Prize in Physiology or Medicine for studying the operations of the olfactory system

1993

- George Stephanopoulos (1982), ABC News personality; senior advisor to U.S. President Bill Clinton's administration
- Richard Ravitch (1955), former chairman of the Metropolitan Transportation Authority and the Bowery Savings Bank
- Judd Gregg (1969), United States Senator from New Hampshire; Governor of New Hampshire; United States Congressman
- Allen Ginsberg (1948), Beat generation poet; author of Howl
- Caitlin Bilodeaux (1987), Olympic fencer

1994

- Gene Rossides (1949), American lobbyist, football player drafted by the New York Giants in 1949, founder of the American Hellenic Institute
- Bernard Nussbaum (1958), White House counsel under Bill Clinton
- Tony Kushner (1978), Academy Award-nominated screenwriter; winner of the Pulitzer Prize for Drama and Tony Award for Angels in America
- Johan Jorgen Holst (1960), Norwegian Minister of Defence and Foreign Affairs; heavily involved with the Oslo Accords

1995

- Stephen Joel Trachtenberg (1959), former president of the University of Hartford and of George Washington University
- Kenneth Lipper (1962), financier and deputy mayor of New York City; Academy Award-winning producer of The Holocaust documentary The Last Days
- Milton Handler (1923), antitrust expert and Columbia Law School professor

1996

- Paul Marks (1945), geneticist, president emeritus of the Memorial Sloan Kettering Cancer Center, former editor-in-chief of the Journal of Clinical Investigation
- Eric Holder (1973), United States Attorney General under Barack Obama, Deputy Attorney General under Bill Clinton, United States Attorney for the District of Columbia, judge of the Superior Court of the District of Columbia
- Henry S. Coleman (1946), former dean of students of Columbia College, Columbia University held hostage during the Columbia University protests of 1968
- Philip L. Milstein (1971), American real estate developer, former chairman of Emigrant Savings Bank, son of Seymour Milstein

1997

- Leonard Koppett (1944), sportswriter; recipient of the J. G. Taylor Spink Award and the Curt Gowdy Media Award
- Herbert Gold (1946), Beat Generation novelist
- Lee Guittar (1953), group vice president of Hearst corporation and former publisher of the San Francisco Examiner, The Denver Post, Dallas Times Herald, and president of USA Today and Detroit Free Press

1998

- Mark H. Willes (1963), former president of the Federal Reserve Bank of Minneapolis, CEO and Publisher of Los Angeles Times and Deseret Management Corporation
- James Rubin (1982), Sky News anchorman; former Assistant Secretary of State for Public Affairs in the Clinton Administration; spokesman for the presidential campaigns of Wesley Clark and John Kerry; husband of Christiane Amanpour
- Milton Pollack (1927), judge of the United States District Court for the Southern District of New York
- Gerald Green (1942), writer of Holocaust and The Last Angry Man, co-creator of NBC's The Today Show
- William Barr (1971), 77th and 85th Attorney General of the United States

1999

- Claire Shipman (1986), ABC News correspondent

== 2000–2009 ==
2000

- Robert Rosencrans (1949), founding chairman of C-SPAN and president of UA-Columbia Cablevision
- Ric Burns (1978), documentary filmmaker, New York: A Documentary Film, The Civil War, brother of filmmaker Ken Burns

2001

- Cristina Teuscher (2000), Olympic gold medalist swimmer
- Michael Gould (1966), former CEO of Bloomingdale's
- Tom Glocer (1981), former CEO of Thomson Reuters and Reuters

2002

- Joel Klein (1967), assistant Attorney General of the United States; Chancellor of the New York City Department of Education

2003

- Joseph A. Greenaway Jr. (1978), federal judge of the United States District Court for the District of New Jersey
- John Corigliano (1959), winner of the Pulitzer Prize for Music and Academy Award for Best Original Score

2004

- Peter Kalikow, 8th chairman of the Metropolitan Transportation Authority, former owner and publisher of the New York Post
- E. Javier Loya, co-founder of OTC Global Holdings & minority owner of NFL's Houston Texans.

2005

- Mark E. Kingdon (1971), hedge fund manager, president of Kingdon Capital Management
- Virginia Cornish (1991), professor of chemistry at Columbia University and recipient of the 2009 Pfizer Award in Enzyme Chemistry

2006

- Alexis Glick (1994), anchorwoman for the Fox Business Network
- Dean Baquet (1978), Pulitzer Prize-winning executive editor of The New York Times
- Jonathan Schiller (1969), Co-founder of Boies Schiller Flexner LLP and former chair of Trustees of Columbia University

2007

- David Paterson (1977), first African American Governor of New York
- Eric Foner (1963), leading contemporary historian of Reconstruction, professor at Columbia University, and winner of the Pulitzer Prize for History, the Lincoln Prize, and Bancroft Prize

2008

- Ronald Mason Jr. (1974), president of the University of the District of Columbia and former president of Southern University
- Jonathan Lavine (1988), business executive and co-managing partner of Bain Capital
- Alexandra Wallace (1988), executive producer of NBC Nightly News
- Barry Bergdoll (1977), former chief curator of Architecture and Design at the Museum of Modern Art, professor at Columbia University, president of the Center for Architecture, and member of the jury of the Pritzker Architecture Prize

2009

- Greg Wyatt (1971), sculptor-in-residence at the Cathedral of St. John the Divine, known for designing the Peace Fountain
- Benjamin Jealous (1994), former president of the NAACP
- Maggie Gyllenhaal (1999), Golden Globe-winning actress for The Honourable Woman, and star in Secretary, Stranger than Fiction and The Dark Knight

== 2010–2019 ==
2010

- Julia Stiles (2005), star of Save the Last Dance and Mona Lisa Smile
- David Rosand (1954), Art historian at Columbia University

2011

- Elizabeth Rubin (1987), American journalist for The New York Times Magazine, sister of Bloomberg News executive editor James Rubin '82
- Michael Oren (1977), Israeli historian and former Israeli ambassador to the United States
- Ken Ofori-Atta (1984), Ghanaian economist and investment banker and current Minister for Finance and Economic Planning, member of the Ofori-Atta family
- Alex Navab (1987), head of the Americas Private Equity Business of Kohlberg Kravis Roberts

2012

- Li Lu (1996), former student leader of the Tiananmen Square protests of 1989, and American investment banker, founder of Himalaya Capital
- Daniel S. Loeb (1983), billionaire, hedge fund manager, founder of Third Point Management
- Ben Horowitz (1988), technology entrepreneur, co-founder of software company Opsware and venture capital firm Andreessen Horowitz, son of conservative writer David Horowitz '59
- Ellen Gustafson (2002), businesswoman, social entrepreneur, food activist, co-founder of FEED Projects and former spokesperson for the World Food Programme
- Dede Gardner (1990), Academy Award-winning producer of 12 Years a Slave; president of Plan B Entertainment

2013

- George Yancopoulos (1980), American billionaire, biomedical scientist and CSO of Regeneron Pharmaceuticals
- Kai-Fu Lee (1983), Taiwanese IT Venture Capitalist, founder of Google China and Microsoft Research Asia
- Katori Hall (2003), American playwright, The Mountaintop

2014

- Mozelle W. Thompson (1976), commissioner of the Federal Trade Commission from 1997 to 2004
- James Melcher (1961), Olympic fencer, president of Fencers Club and hedge fund manager
- Robert Lefkowitz (1962), winner of the Nobel Prize in Chemistry

2015

- Andrew W. Marlowe (1988), creator of Castle; writer of Air Force One, End of Days, and Hollow Man
- Ira Katznelson (1966), American political scientist and historian, professor and interim provost at Columbia University
- Kyra Tirana Barry (1987), team leader for U.S. Women's National wrestling team

2016

- Jon Abbott (1984), president and CEO of WGBH Educational Foundation
- Julius Genachowski (1985), Chairman of the Federal Communications Commission
- Jeffrey L. Kessler (1975), co-chairman of Winston & Strawn; former Global Litigation Chair at Dewey & LeBoeuf
- John Vaske (1988), executive at Goldman Sachs
- Sheena Wright (1990, 1994 law), first woman president of the United Way of New York City and now a deputy mayor of New York City

2017

- David B. Barry (1987)
- Joseph A. Cabrera (1982)
- Jenji Kohan (1991), television writer, producer, creator of Orange Is the New Black and Weeds
- Toomas Hendrik Ilves (1975), former President of Estonia
- William von Mueffling (1990), hedge fund manager, president of Cantillon Capital Management

2018

- Ron Simons (1982), producer, four-time Tony Award winner
- Julie Menin (1989), former chairperson of Manhattan Community Board 1 and former commissioner of the New York City Department of Consumer Affairs
- Eric Garcetti (1992), member of the Los Angeles City Council and current Mayor of Los Angeles

2019

- Tom Kitt (1996), American composer, co-winner of the 2010 Pulitzer Prize for Drama and the Tony Award for Best Original Score for his score of the musical Next to Normal
- Jodi Kantor (1996), writer and former editor on culture and politics for The New York Times, winner of the 2018 Pulitzer Prize for Public Service for breaking the story on Harvey Weinstein's sexual abuse cases
- Erik Feig (1992), Lionsgate co-president and former president of Summit Entertainment, producer, Step Up series, Escape Plan, Mr. & Mrs. Smith

== 2020–2029 ==
2022

- Lanny A. Breuer (1980), United States Assistant Attorney General for the Criminal Division
- Anna Fang (2004), CEO of ZhenFund
- Poppy Harlow (2005), correspondent for CNN

2023

- Ashish Jha (1992), White House Coronavirus Response Coordinator

== Controversy ==
A dinner, during which the award would be bestowed upon the recipients, is usually held to raise scholarship and support money for the John Jay National Scholars Program. The dinner was cancelled in 1989, when alumni awardee Frank Lorenzo, then Chairman of Eastern Air Lines, was widely criticized for his treatment of Eastern Air Lines' striking machinists and for his controversial managing techniques.

In 2004, the award was given to American real estate businessman Peter Kalikow, who was serving as chairman of the Metropolitan Transportation Authority and was the former owner and publisher of the New York Post. Kalikow's son graduated from the college in 2002 and he had been a major donor to the university. His selection marked the first time since 1979 that the award was given to a non-alumnus of the college. His receipt had generated controversy among professors and alumni, among them Professor Michael Rosenthal and former Alumni Association President Harvey Rubin, an independent publisher who is the father of college alumni James and Elizabeth Rubin. Since then, only alumni of the college are eligible for the award.

== See also ==
- List of Columbia College people
- Columbia College, the undergraduate liberal arts college of Columbia University
