= Gedale B. Horowitz =

American banker and securities industry regulator (1932–2020)

- Born: June 13, 1932
- Died: April 2, 2020 (aged 87)
- Education: Columbia University (BA, JD)
- Occupations: banker, municipal bond expert
- Known for: Partner at Salomon Brothers; Chairman of the Municipal Securities Rulemaking Board

Gedale B. "Dale" Horowitz (June 13, 1932 – April 2, 2020) was an American banker and securities industry regulator known for serving on the executive committee of Salomon Brothers, founding and chairing the Public Securities Association and Securities Industry Association, and being the founding member and chairman of the Municipal Securities Rulemaking Board.

== Education ==
Horowitz was educated at the Bronx High School of Science, graduated from Columbia College in 1953 and Columbia Law School in 1955.

== Career ==
Horowitz joined Salomon Brothers in 1955 after graduating from law school and was made general partner in 1967. He would then serve on the executive committee of Salomon Brothers until its sale to Travelers Group in 1997. After the merger between the Travelers Group and Citicorp in 1998, he served as a managing director of Citigroup's Institutional Clients Group until his retirement in 2019, having served the firm and its predecessor for 60 years.

In addition to his banking career, he served as a key delegate of industry trade groups and founded the Public Securities Association, a trade association of banks, dealers and brokers that underwrite, trade and sell U.S. federal, state and local government securities, in 1967 that later became the Bond Market Association and served as its chairman in 1979. He also chaired the Securities Industry Association in 1991, having served as its director from 1984 to 1986 and 1988 to 1990, as well as its treasurer in 1987. The two financial industry associations were later merged into the Securities Industry and Financial Markets Association. He was the only person in the securities industry to have served both posts.

He also served on government boards, including the U.S. Treasury Borrowing Advisory Committee, from 1979 to 1991 and from 1996 to 2000, and served as its chairman in 1986 and 1987. He is most known for being appointed by the U.S. Securities and Exchange Commission to serve as a founding member of the Municipal Securities Rulemaking Board and its chairman in 1977-78.

Horowitz played an instrumental role in the financial recovery of New York City and New York State and served as a director of the Municipal Assistance Corporation from 1988 to 1994. As senior director of Salomon Brothers, he later led the financial recovery of Orange County, California as the county's financial advisor during its 18-month bankruptcy period.

== Philanthropy ==
He served as a trustee of Barnard College for 34 years and was a trustee emeritus of the women's college.

== Personal life ==
He was predeceased by his wife, Barbara Silver Horowitz, in 2011. She was also a trustee of Barnard College and a graduate in the class of 1955. Horowitz died on April 2, 2020, at age 87 after a long illness.
