= Liar's poker =

American bar game

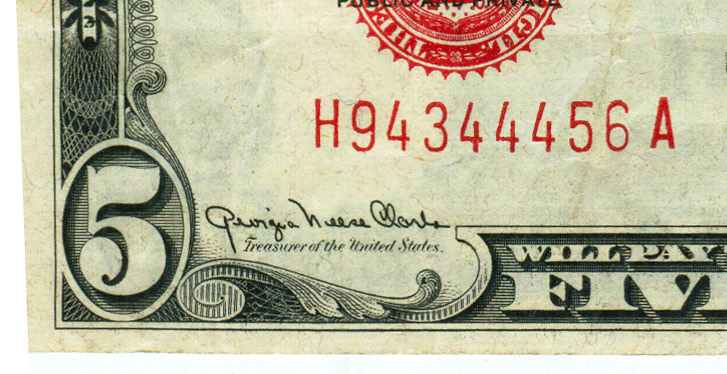
A serial number on a five dollar bill

Liar's poker is an American bar game that combines statistical reasoning with bluffing, and is played with the eight numerical digits of the serial number on U.S. dollar bills (that is, excluding the letters/symbols which appear just before and after the eight numerical digits). The digits are usually ranked with the 1 as "ace" as the highest value, followed by 0 as "10", down to 2 as the lowest. Each player holds one bill, unseen by the other players. The objective is to guess how often a particular digit appears among all the bills held by all the players. Each guess or bid must be higher in quantity, or equal in quantity but higher in value, than the previous bid. The round ends when all the other players challenge a bid.

The game is similar in structure to Liar's dice.

In his 1989 book Liar's Poker, Michael Lewis details how Salomon Brothers traders would play liar's poker. He recounts how John Meriwether was once challenged by CEO John Gutfreund to a game of liar's poker for stakes of one million dollars. Gutfreund then declined to play when confronted by a counter-offer of ten million from Meriwether.

== Gameplay ==
Each player takes a dollar bill and looks at its serial number without letting any other players see it.

The starting player makes an opening bid on how many of a particular digit appears across all serial numbers held by the group. For example, if the first player bids three 6s, they are predicting there are at least three 6s among all the players including their own note. The next player can bid a higher value at that quantity (three 7s), any value at a higher quantity (four 5s), or challenge the bid. The game continues clockwise around the table until a particular bid is challenged by every other player. If the challenge is correct, and the total number of the digit on all the bills is lower than the bid, the bidder loses a dollar to each of the other players. If the challenge is incorrect, the bidder wins a dollar from each player.
