= Association for Financial Markets in Europe =

European financial industry organization

- Abbreviation: afme
- Predecessor: London Investment Banking Association (LIBA) and EU chapter of the Securities Industry and Financial Markets Association
- Formation: 2009; 17 years ago
- Type: Nonprofit trade association
- Legal status: Association
- Purpose: Voice of Europe's wholesale financial markets participants
- Locations: London, United Kingdom; Brussels, Belgium
- Region served: Europe
- Products: Advocacy for wholesale financial markets
- Official language: English
- Chief Executive Officer: Adam Farkas
- Affiliations: GFMA Alliance
- Funding: Member fees
- Website: www.afme.eu

The Association for Financial Markets in Europe (AFME) is an industry advocacy organization that represents wholesale market participants in Europe, including the European Union and the United Kingdom.

== History ==
AFME was formed in 2009 by the merger of the London Investment Banking Association (LIBA) and the European activities of the U.S.-based Securities Industry and Financial Markets Association. At the same time, the Global Financial Markets Association was created to represent the securities and financial markets industry at the international level.

Senior financial policymakers have regularly spoken at AFME events, e.g. European Commissioner Mairead McGuinness and Bank of England deputy governor Jon Cunliffe.

AFME generated controversy in 2019 when hiring Adam Farkas, the former executive director of the European Banking Authority, as its chief executive.

== Chief Executives ==
- Tim Ryan (2009–2010)
- Simon Lewis (2010–2019)
- Adam Farkas (since 2019)

== See also ==
- European Banking Federation
- Eurofi
- Global Financial Markets Association (gfma)
