= International Monetary Conference =

Financial industry organization

The International Monetary Conference (IMC) is a non-profit organization that convenes a yearly gathering of senior financial industry executives. It has been described as "an annual conference of the CEOs of the largest banks around the world".

== Overview ==
The IMC was created in 1954. As of 2023, it comprised 58 banks from 31 countries. The conference invites experts and senior policymakers, including central bank governors and senior officials from multilateral organisations including the International Monetary Fund and World Bank. It has been established as a tax-exempt entity in Washington DC since 1973.

In 2023, the IMC was held on the sides of the 2023 United Nations Climate Change Conference (COP28) in Dubai and was chaired by John C. Dugan, chairman of Citigroup.

== See also ==
- Financial Services Forum
- Institut International d'Études Bancaires
- Eurofi
- International Monetary and Economic Conferences in the late 19th and early 20th centuries
