= Institut International d'Études Bancaires =

European financial club

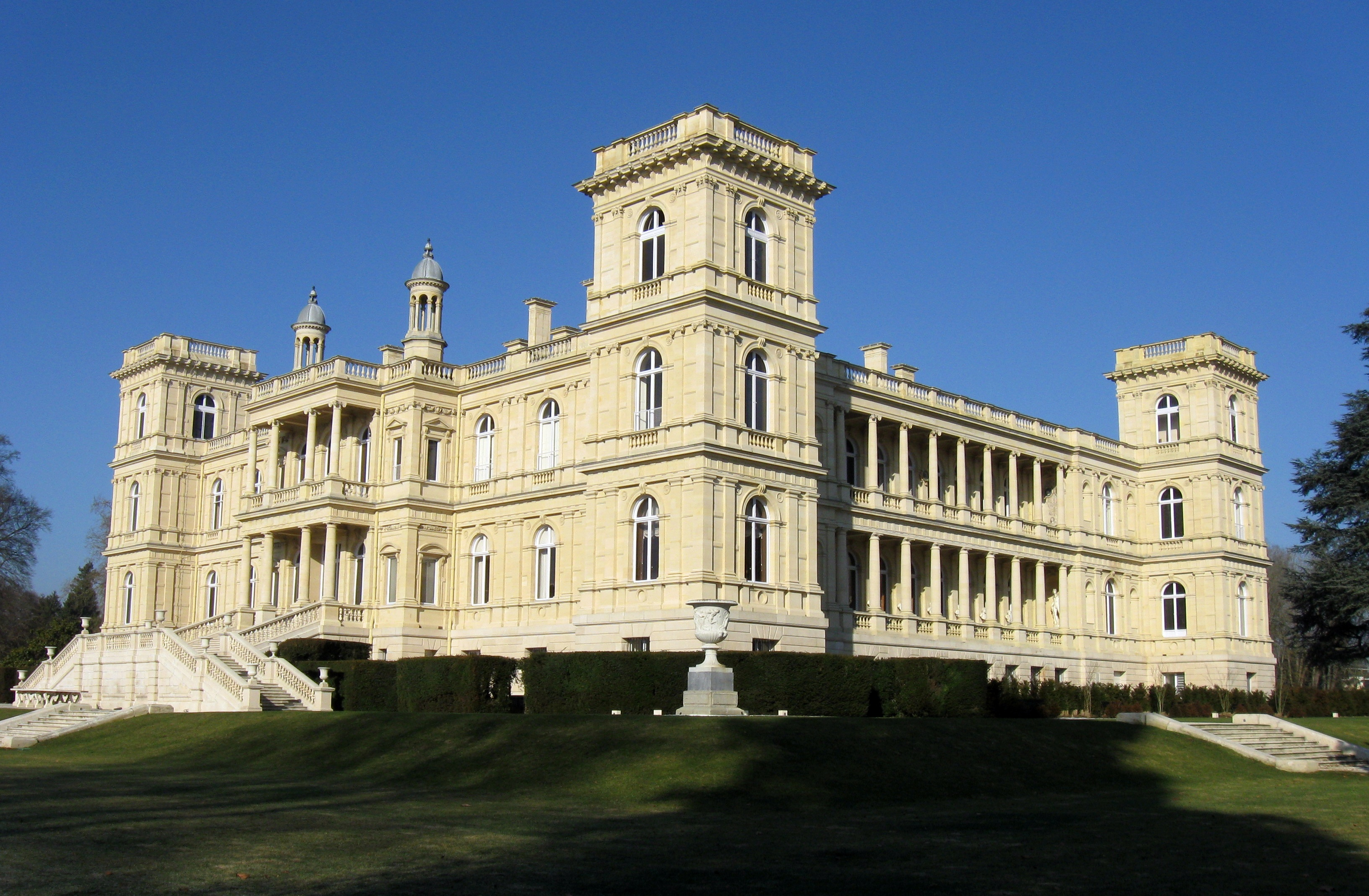
The May 1964 meeting of the IIEB was hosted by the Rothschild family at their Château de Ferrières in the far outskirts of Paris

The Institut International d’Études Bancaires (IIEB) (lit. 'International Institute for Banking Research') is a private association that brings together the leaders of major European banks.

== History ==
The IIEB was founded on 6 April 1951 as part of the broader postwar European integration movement. The founding organizations were Crédit Industriel et Commercial, Union Bank of Switzerland, Société Générale de Belgique and Amsterdamsche Bank. In early years, the IIEB publicized at least some of its events, such as its 15th session held in Brussels on 9-10 May 1958. In more recent times, the IIEB has typically preferred not to disclose the themes discussed at its meetings even when the meeting itself has been a matter of public knowledge, such as the one in Vienna in October 2011.

In 1997, an IIEB meeting resulted in the merger which formed UBS, one of the largest banks in the world. In 2010, Handelsbanken's CEO withdrew from the group just before it met in Stockholm.

== Activity ==
The IIEB does not maintain a website or disclose its membership. It hosts twice-annual three-day conferences in which bank CEOs attend business discussions and socialize. In recent years, central bank officials speaking at the IIEB have often published the text of their speech.

== See also ==
- International Monetary Conference
- Financial Services Forum
