= Variable rate debt obligation =

Short-term investment instrument

A variable rate debt obligation (VRDO) is a tax-exempt short-term investment instrument based on long-term municipal bonds. The total value of outstanding VRDOs was estimated at $500 billion in November 2008.

== See also ==
- Auction rate security
