= Salomon Brothers =

Former American investment bank

Salomon Brothers, Inc.

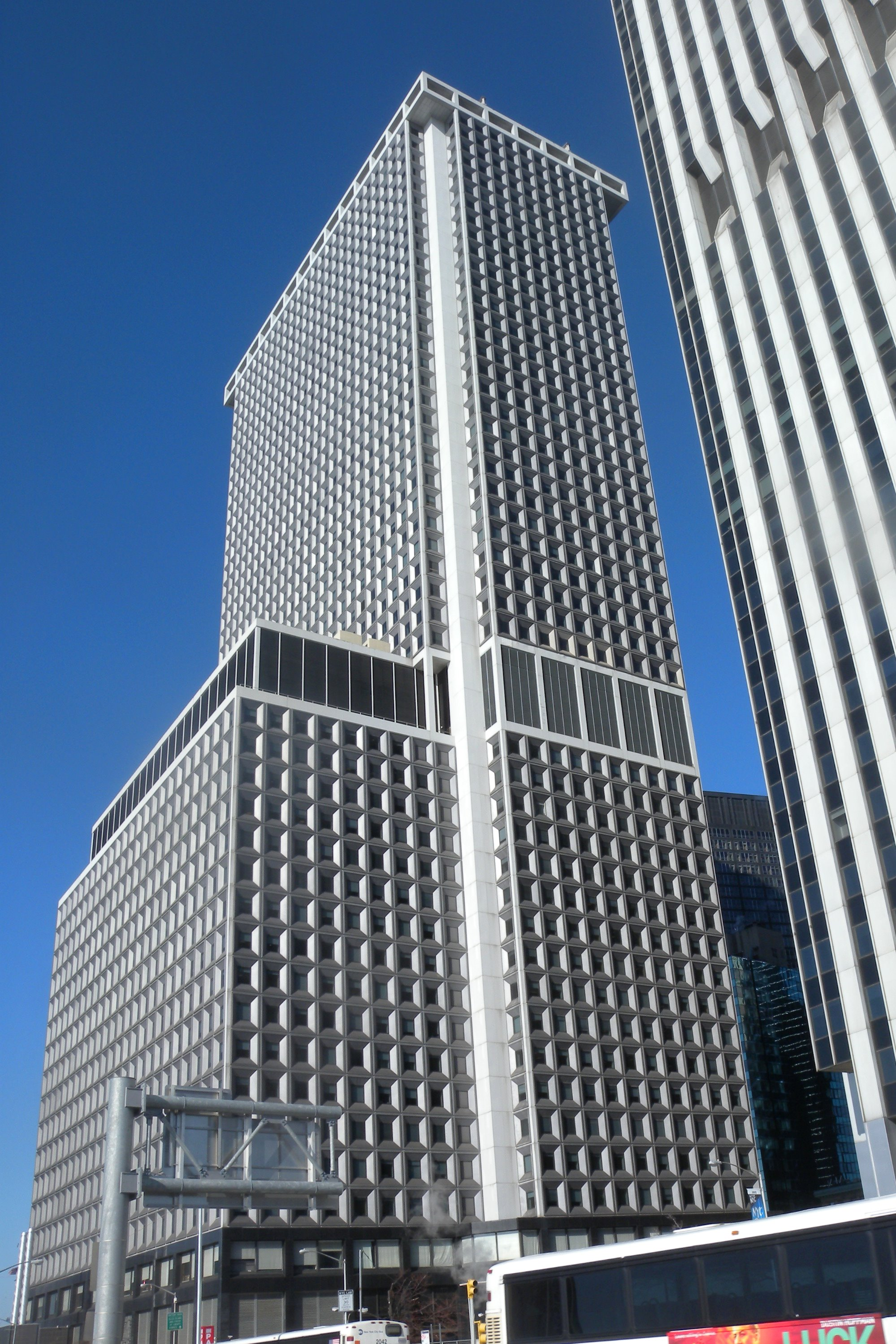
- 1 New York Plaza, which was Salomon Brothers' headquarters starting in 1970
- Type: Public
- Traded as: NYSE: SB
- Industry: Financial services
- Founded: 1910; 116 years ago
- Founders: Arthur Salomon; Herbert Salomon; Percy Salomon
- Defunct: 2003; 23 years ago (name dropped by Citigroup)
- Fate: Acquired by Travelers Group in 1997
- Successor: Salomon Smith Barney (1997–2004), Smith Barney (2003–2009)
- Headquarters: 7 World Trade Center; 250 Greenwich Street; New York, NY 10006; U.S.
- Key people: John Gutfreund (chairman, 1978–1991); Warren Buffett (chairman, 1991–1997); Deryck Maughan (CEO, 1992–1997)
- Products: Sales and trading, Investment banking
- Revenue: ▲US$9.046 billion (1996)
- Net income: ▲US$617 million (1996)
- Total assets: ▲US$194.881 billion (1996)
- Number of employees: ▲7,100 (1996)

Salomon Brothers, Inc., was an American multinational bulge bracket investment bank headquartered in New York City. It was one of the five largest investment banking enterprises in the United States and a very profitable firm on Wall Street during the 1980s and 1990s. Its CEO and chairman at that time, John Gutfreund, was nicknamed "the King of Wall Street".

Salomon Brothers served many of the largest corporations in America. It was a leading underwriter of corporate bonds and one of the top firms in futures and options (known as "derivatives") and in securitization in a range of asset classes including commercial real estate securities.

The bank was famed for its "cutthroat corporate culture that rewarded risk-taking with massive bonuses, punishing poor results with a swift boot". In Michael Lewis' 1989 book Liar's Poker, the insider descriptions of life at Salomon gave way to the popular view of banking in the 1980s and 1990s as a money-focused and work-intensive environment. It was acquired by Travelers Group in 1997, which in turn became part of Citigroup the next year.

In February 2022, it was announced that the Salomon Brothers brand will be revived by a group of former employees and execs and operate as full-service investment bank again.

== History ==
=== Founding ===
Founded in 1910 by Arthur, Herbert, and Percy Salomon, sons of Sophia Flora Heilbron and Ferdinand Salomon, along with a clerk, Ben Levy. The founding Salomon Brothers are descendants of Haym Salomon, primary financier of the American Revolutionary War, Consul to France, and childhood friend to Robert Morris, Founding Father and Superintendent of Finance of the United States. The company remained a partnership until the early 1980s. William Salomon, the son of Percy Salomon, became a managing partner and the head of the company in 1963.

In 1967, Salomon Brothers sponsored Muriel Siebert, the first woman to obtain a trading license on the floor of the New York Stock Exchange.

=== Top ranking and public financing: 1970-1979 ===
In 1975, Salomon Brothers was formally recognized by other top investment banks as a "bulge bracket" firm, meaning it was one of the leaders in investment banking. In 1979, Salomon Brothers scored a major coup when IBM insisted that Morgan Stanley accept Salomon Brothers as co-manager on a $1-billion debt issue for a new generation of IBM computers. Morgan Stanley demanded sole management, but IBM affirmed Salomon Brothers’ role as co-manager. In response, Morgan Stanley refused to act as co-manager, and Salomon Brothers and Merrill Lynch were awarded top billing as a result.

In 1975, Salomon Brothers also aided the state's efforts to save New York City from bankruptcy. When the Municipal Action Committee (MAC) was established, and bonds were created in its name, Salomon Brothers and Morgan Guaranty Trust organized syndicates for the $1 billion bond sale. Both of the organizations were able to place the bonds successfully.

In 1978, John Gutfreund became a managing partner and succeeded William Salomon as head of the company.

=== Salomon Brothers during the 1980s ===
In 1981, it was acquired by the commodity trading firm Phibro Corporation and became Salomon Inc. It was the reverse merger that enabled Gutfreund to take the company public. Gutfreund became the CEO of the company following the reverse merger.

During the 1980s, Salomon was noted for its innovation in the bond market, selling the first mortgage-backed security, a hitherto obscure species of financial instrument created by Ginnie Mae. Shortly thereafter, Salomon purchased home mortgages from thrifts throughout the United States and packaged them into mortgage-backed securities, which it sold to local and international investors. Later, it moved away from traditional investment banking (helping companies raise funds in the capital market and negotiating mergers and acquisitions) to almost exclusively proprietary trading (the buying and selling of stocks, bonds, options, etc. for the profit of the company itself). Salomon had expertise in fixed income securities and trading based on daily swings in the bond market.

The firm competed for the leveraged buyout of RJR Nabisco and the leveraged buyout of Revco stores (which ended in failure).

In 1987, a New York Times report identified Salomon Brothers as one of the top firms, along with Merrill Lynch, Morgan Stanley, and Goldman Sachs. However, Salomon Brothers went through significant turmoil during the year. In July, Lewis Ranieri, the firm's vice chairman and the head of the mortgage trading department, was forced out. By September, Salomon's stock had fallen by more than 9% for the year due to trading losses in the bond market. The firm's largest shareholder, Bermuda-based Minorco, controlled by Harry Oppenheimer, sought to sell its 14% stake. Revlon owner Ronald Perelman, funded by Michael Milken of Drexel Burnham Lambert, expressed an interest in acquiring Minorco's 21.3 million shares worth $800 million. However, Salomon management, wary that Perelman sought more than Minorco's shares, sought the help of investor Warren Buffett to purchase the shares themselves by selling $700 million worth of convertible preferred stock to Buffett's firm Berkshire Hathaway and giving it two seats on the Salomon board.

Salomon Brothers' success in the 1980s is documented in Michael Lewis' 1989 book, Liar's Poker. Lewis went through Salomon's training program and then became a bond salesman at Salomon Brothers in London. Lewis presented an insider account of life at Salomon Brothers, and his book became a seminal work on the firm's corporate culture in the 1980s.

Lewis describing the trading floor at Salomon:

Because the forty-first floor was the chosen home of the firm's most ambitious people, and because there were no rules governing the pursuit of profit and glory, the men who worked there, including the more bloodthirsty, had a hunted look about them. The place was governed by the simple understanding that the unbridled pursuit of perceived self interest was healthy. Eat or be eaten. The men of 41 worked with one eye cast over their shoulders to see whether someone was trying to do them in, for there was no telling what manner of man had levered himself to the rung below you and was now hungry for your job. The limit of acceptable conduct within Salomon Brothers was wide indeed. It said something about the ability of the free marketplace to mold people's behavior into a socially acceptable pattern. For this was capitalism at its most raw, and it was self-destructive...

=== 1990s treasury bonds crisis ===
In 1991, U.S. Treasury Deputy Assistant Secretary Mike Basham learned that Salomon trader Paul Mozer had been submitting false bids in an attempt to purchase more treasury bonds than permitted by one buyer during the period between December 1990 and May 1991. Mozer and Thomas Murphy used unauthorised accounts to purchase four-year Treasury notes in December 1990 and five-year Treasury notes in February 1991. Including separate purchases the company had made in its own name, the total purchases exceeded the 35 percent limit on issues.

Salomon was fined $190 million for this infraction, and required to set aside $100 million in a restitution fund for any injured parties. In December 1993, Mozer was sentenced to four months in a minimum-security prison and fined $30,000. CEO Gutfreund left the company in August 1991 and a U.S. Securities and Exchange Commission (SEC) settlement resulted in a fine of $100,000 and Gutfreund being barred from serving as a chief executive of a brokerage firm. Warren Buffett briefly stepped into the CEO and chairman position. Buffett later promoted Deryck Maughan to take over as chairman and CEO. The scandal was then documented in the 1993 book Nightmare on Wall Street: Salomon Brothers and the Corruption of the Marketplace by Martin Mayer.

The firm's top bond traders called themselves "Big Swinging Dicks," and were the inspiration for the novel The Bonfire of the Vanities, written by Tom Wolfe. The expression "Big Swinging Dick(s)" itself was used to refer to the Salomon bankers who dominated the game of extraordinary profit-making.

Some members of the Salomon Brothers' bond arbitrage, such as John Meriwether, Myron Scholes, and Eric Rosenfeld, later became involved with Long-Term Capital Management (LTCM), a hedge fund that collapsed in 1998. The last years of Salomon Brothers, culminating in its involvement with LTCM, are chronicled in the 2007 book A Demon of Our Own Design by Richard Bookstaber.

=== Citigroup ===
Salomon (NYSE:SB) was acquired by Travelers Group in 1997 for $9 billion; and, following the latter's merger with Citicorp in 1998, Salomon became part of Citigroup. The combined investment banking operations became known as Salomon Smith Barney. 7 World Trade Center, which had served as the headquarters for Salomon Brothers, continued to be used as the company's main office after the company was merged into Salomon Smith Barney.

Although the Salomon name carried on as Salomon Smith Barney, the investment banking operations of Citigroup, the division was renamed on 7 April 2003 to "Citigroup Global Markets Inc." As of 2020, Citigroup no longer owns the Salomon Brothers trademark, according to the records provided by the United States Patent and Trademark Office.

== Notable employees ==
- Michael Lewis, American author and financial journalist, author of The Big Short, worked as a bond salesman in London for Salomon Brothers in the late 1980s. His book Liar's Poker chronicles his time there.
- John Meriwether, American hedge fund manager, head of fixed-income trading, and was promoted to vice-chairman in 1988.
- Michael Bloomberg, former mayor of New York City (2002–2013), head of equity trading and systems development in the 1970s.
- John Lipsky, acting managing director of the International Monetary Fund from May to July 2011, former director of the European Economic and Market Analysis Group until 1992.
- Lewis Ranieri, "father" of mortgage-backed securities, headed the mortgage bonds desk at Salomon and reached the post of vice chairman.
- John Gutfreund, former chairman and CEO of Salomon Brothers, who made the firm public.
- Myron Scholes, economist who invented the Black–Scholes model, recipient of the Nobel Memorial Prize in Economic Sciences in 1997, former managing director of fixed-income derivatives.
- Gedale B. Horowitz, founder and chairman of the Public Securities Association and Securities Industry Association, founding chairman of the Municipal Securities Rulemaking Board, member of the firm's executive committee.
- Nicholas Glinsman, widely regarded as the "Architect" of modern futures trading at Salomon Brothers. Joining the firm in 1990 as Senior Vice President and later serving as Senior Managing Director and Head of Futures & Options Sales & Trading. A prominent figure in the "Salomon Diaspora," he collaborated directly with Nobel laureate Myron Scholes and research head Marty Leibowitz on strategic projects for the EBRD. His leadership extended to overseeing personnel in the exchange pits and managing global distribution for European product sales.
- Michael Corbat, CEO of Citigroup from 2012 to 2021, began his career in the mortgage department in 1983.
- Robert Rahman, Founder and CEO of Rahman Financial & Company
- Bill Browder, British-American financier and political activist. Founder and CEO of Hermitage Capital Management
- Chris Innes, American Financier, former Global Head of Equities, Derivatives, and Prime Brokerage at Bank of America
