= Auction rate security =

Debt instrument with a long-term nominal maturity with a regularly reset interest rate

An auction rate security (ARS) typically refers to a debt instrument (corporate or municipal bonds) with a long-term nominal maturity for which the interest rate is regularly reset through a Dutch auction. Since February 2008, most such auctions have failed, and the auction market has been largely frozen. In late 2008, investment banks that had marketed and distributed auction rate securities agreed to repurchase most of them at par.

== Background ==
The first auction rate security for the tax-exempt market was introduced by Goldman Sachs in 1988, a $121.4 million financing for Tucson Electric Company by the Industrial Development Authority of Pima County, Arizona. However, the security was invented by Ronald Gallatin at Lehman Brothers in 1984.

Auctions are typically held every 7, 28, or 35 days; interest on these securities is paid at the end of each auction period. Certain types of daily auctioned ARSs have coupons paid on the first of every month. There are also other, more unusual, reset periods, including 14 day, 49 days, 91 days, semi-annual and annual. Non-daily ARS settle on the next business day, daily ARS settle the same day.

As bank loans became more expensive, the auction market became increasingly attractive to issuers seeking the low cost and flexibility of variable rate debt. Buyers received a slightly higher interest and an apparent assurance of liquidity through the auction process.

By early 2008 the ARS market had grown to over $200 billion, with roughly half of the securities owned by corporate investors. Because of their complexity and the minimum denomination of $25,000, most holders of auction rate securities are institutional investors and high-net-worth individuals.

In February 2008, the auction market failed, and most auction rate securities have been frozen since then, with holders unable to dispose of their securities. Investment banks that participated in the distribution and marketing have agreed to repurchase around $50 billion in securities from investors, including municipalities, to resolve investigations by U.S. state attorneys general and the SEC.

Student loan auction rate securities (SLARS) make up a large percentage of the ARS market.

== Overview ==
The interest rate on ARS is determined through a Dutch auction process. The total number of shares available to auction at any given period is determined by the number of existing bond holders who wish to sell or hold bonds only at a minimum yield.

Existing holders and potential investors enter a competitive bidding process through broker/dealer(s). Buyers specify the number of shares, typically in denominations of $25,000, they wish to purchase with the lowest interest rate they are willing to accept.

Each bid and order size is ranked from lowest to highest minimum bid rate. The lowest bid rate at which all the shares can be sold at par establishes the interest rate, otherwise known as the "clearing rate". This rate is paid on the entire issue for the upcoming period. Investors who bid a minimum rate above the clearing rate receive no bonds, while those whose minimum bid rates were at or below the clearing rate receive the clearing rate for the next period.

Many financial services companies have been involved in packaging a collection of similar instruments, such as municipal bonds, into closed funds that were sold as both preferred and common shares. One of the largest issuers of auction rate securities was NUVEEN Investments, which since the failure of the auction market has begun to provide disclosure on their website. These funds were then labeled with names, such as "MuniPreferred", and actively marketed by brokers, such as TD Ameritrade. According to multiple reports, these were widely sold as "cash equivalents", such that the cash would be available for return within as little as 7 days. However, once the auctions were abandoned by the banks, thousands of investors were left with these illiquid funds since February 2008, without knowing when their cash will be returned.

=== Price talk ===
Before the day's auction starts, broker-dealers will typically provide "price talk" to their clients which includes a range of likely clearing rates for that auction. The price talk is based on a number of factors including the issuer's credit rating, reset period of the ARS, and the last clearance rate for this and other similar issues. It might also take into account general macroeconomic events, such as announcements by the Federal Reserve Board of a change in the federal funds rate. Clients, however, are not required to bid within the price talk range.

=== Types of orders ===
- Hold – Hold an existing position regardless of the new interest rate (these shares are not included in auction).
- Hold at rate – Bid to hold an existing position at a specified minimum rate. If the clearance rate is below the bid to hold rate, the securities are sold. (A "hold at rate" is not identical to a "buy", but it's one type of "buy". It is the same as "buy" bidding with a certain rate (a hold rate) and current amount in participating the auction. Therefore, if the clearing rate is lower than the hold rate, the holder fails to win the auction and the securities are sold. And if the clearing rate is higher than (or the same as) the hold rate, the holder wins the auction and gets the same amount of securities at the clearing rate.)
- Sell – Sell an existing position regardless of the interest rate set at the auction.
- Buy – Submit a bid to buy a new position at a specified minimum interest rate (new buyers or existing holders adding to their position at a specified interest rate).

=== All-hold auction ===
If all current holders decide to hold their securities without specifying a minimum rate, the auction is called an "all hold" auction and the new rate will be set to the "all hold rate" defined in the offering documents for the issue. The "all hold rate" typically is based on a certain percentage of a reference rate, usually the London Interbank Offered Rate (LIBOR), the Bond Market Association (TBMA) index, or an index of Treasury security. This rate is usually significantly below the market rate.

=== Failed auction ===
If there are not enough orders to purchase all the shares being sold at the auction, a failed auction occurs. In this scenario, the rate is set to the maximum rate defined for the issuer (typically a multiple of LIBOR or the TBMA index). The purpose of the higher rate is to compensate the holders who have not been able to sell their positions (though this compensation may be more or less than the loss in value due to becoming illiquid). Until 2008, broker-dealers would usually bid on their own behalf to prevent failed auctions from happening, as the commissions they earned from keeping the market functioning normally outweighed the occasional commitment of capital. This made failed auctions extremely rare, although they did occur on occasion. In 2008 the market froze when broker-dealers withdrew (apparently having decided that preserving capital was more important than the continued commission income).

=== The SEC cease-and-desist order of 2006 ===
In 2006, the SEC concluded an investigation of 15 firms, representing the Auction Rate Securities industry. The SEC summarized its findings: "between January 2003 and June 2004, each firm engaged in one or more practices that were not adequately disclosed to investors, which constituted violations of the securities laws." The SEC issued a cease-and-desist order to stop these violations.

The SEC order listed several illegal practices in the conduct of auctions, and noted: "In addition, since the firms were under no obligation to guarantee against a failed auction, investors may not have been aware of the liquidity and credit risks associated with certain securities. By engaging in these practices, the firms violated Section 17(a)(2) of the Securities Act of 1933, which prohibits material misstatements and omissions in any offer or sale of securities."

The auction failures in February 2008 led to industry-wide freezing of clients' accounts while requiring municipalities to pay excessive interest rates, reported to exceed 20% in some cases. A renewed investigation of the auction rate securities industry was led by Andrew Cuomo, the Attorney General of New York, and William Galvin, Secretary of the Commonwealth of Massachusetts. These investigations discovered continued industry-wide violations of the law by misrepresenting auction rate securities as liquid cash alternatives while failing to meet the SEC order to disclose to clients the liquidity and credit risks involved. Many, but not all, of the firms involved in these practices chose to settle out of court. The settlements usually involved repurchasing the auction rate securities they had sold to clients and paying penalties to the regulators and attorneys general.

=== Secondary market ===
Although not obligated to do so, auction-running broker-dealers may provide a secondary market for auction rate securities between auctions. If such a market develops, securities can be traded between interested clients at a discount from par value with accrued interest. However, auction-running broker-dealers are generally reluctant to facilitate secondary trading at a discount from par, due to the fact that in doing so they would necessitate markdowns to the value of other clients' holdings.

== 2008 auction failures ==
Beginning on Thursday, February 7, 2008, auctions for these securities began to fail when investors declined to bid on the securities. The four largest investment banks who make a market in these securities (Citigroup, UBS, Morgan Stanley and Merrill Lynch) declined to act as bidders of last resort, as they had in the past. This was a result of the scope and size of the market failure, combined with the firms' needs to protect their capital during the 2008 financial crisis.

On February 13, 2008, 80% of auctions failed. On February 20, 62% failed (395 out of 641 auctions). As a comparison, from 1984 until the end of 2007, there were a total of 44 failed auctions.

On March 28, 2008, UBS AG said it was marking down the value of auction rate securities in brokerage accounts from a few percentage points to more than 20%. The markdowns reflected the estimated drop in value of the securities because the market had frozen, while UBS didn't offer to buy the securities at the new lower prices.

Beginning in March 2008, class action lawsuits were filed against several of the large banks. The lawsuits were filed in federal court in Manhattan alleging that these investment banks deceptively marketed auction rate securities as cash alternatives.

On July 17, 2008, a national task force, said to be composed of officials from several states including Missouri, began investigating at the St. Louis, Missouri headquarters of Wachovia Securities, a division of Charlotte, North Carolina–based Wachovia Corporation. Some in the media were calling it a raid; officials called it a "special investigation" at the St. Louis offices. Media reports also said that the "special investigation" was prompted by the failure of Wachovia Securities to comply with requests by officials. In addition, it was reported that other securities firms were also a part of the investigation. The Missouri state action came after complaints to the state about a total of more than $40 million of investments that were frozen.

On August 1, 2008, the New York State attorney general notified Citigroup of his intent to file charges over the sale of troubled auction rate securities and claimed Citigroup destroyed documents.

On August 7, 2008, in a proposed settlement of state and federal regulators' charges, Citigroup agreed in principle to buy back about $7.3 billion of auction rate securities it had sold to charities, individual investors, and small businesses. The agreement also called for Citigroup to use its "best efforts" to make liquid all of the US$12b auction-rate securities it sold to institutional investors, including retirement plans, by the end of 2009. The settlement allowed Citigroup to avoid admitting or denying claims that it had sold auction rate securities as safe, liquid investments.

Also on August 7, a few hours after Citigroup's settlement announcement, Merrill Lynch announced that effective January 15, 2009, and through January 15, 2010, it would offer to buy at par auction rate securities it had sold to its retail clients. Merrill Lynch's action created liquidity for more than 30,000 clients who held municipal, closed-end funds and student loan auction rate securities. Under the plan, retail clients of Merrill Lynch would have a year, beginning on January 15, 2009, and ending January 15, 2010, in which to sell their auction rate securities to Merrill Lynch if they so wished.

In August 2008, the Securities and Exchange Commission's Division of Enforcement engaged in preliminary settlements with several of the larger broker-dealers including Citigroup, JPMorgan Chase, Merrill Lynch, Morgan Stanley, RBC Group and UBS. The proposed settlement called for these broker-dealers to repurchase outstanding ARS from their individual investors.

In November 2009, JPMorgan Chase settled a lawsuit brought by the SEC over failed ARSs issued with Jefferson County, Alabama (Birmingham area). The specific charge was bribery, not securities fraud, but the bank agreed to pay $75 million in penalties and drop a $647 million charge against the heavily indebted county.

In his financial blog Sense on Cents, Larry Doyle referred to the marketing and distribution by Wall Street of auction-rate securities as "the single greatest fraud ever perpetrated on investors".

== Centralized access to municipal auction rate security information ==
On January 30, 2009, the Municipal Securities Rulemaking Board began to provide free centralized access to up-to-date interest rates and auction results for municipal auction rate securities in connection with each periodic auction through its Electronic Municipal Market Access system (EMMA) at Municipal Securities Rulemaking Board::EMMA.

== Apparent benefits of auction rate securities ==
For issuers, ARS appeared to offer low financing cost, in some cases more attractive than traditional variable rate demand obligations (VRDOs). No third-party bank support was required, and there were typically fewer parties to the financing process. ARS eliminated renewal risk and the risk of increased fees. There was no exposure to bank rating downgrades, and ARS offered the same flexibility found in traditional VRDOs.

For buyers, ARS provided a slightly higher after tax yield than money market instruments due to their complexity with an increase in risk. Most securities were AAA rated as well as federal, state and local tax exempt. They also provided an opportunity to diversify one's cash equivalent holdings.

The collapse of the market in February 2008 revealed that these benefits were largely illusory. When market participants lost confidence, the auction mechanism failed. As a result, the ARS market has effectively ceased to exist.

== Valuation of auction rate securities ==
Accounting Statement FAS 157 defines fair value, which under the new guideline, is typically referred to as “mark to market” accounting. With Auction Rate Securities no longer being liquid, public companies began to write down their ARS holdings starting in the first quarter of 2008. Through May 31, 2008, 402 publicly traded companies had reported Auction Rate Securities on their books. Of those 402, 185 had taken some level of impairment. However, there had been no ascertainable trend in the amount of writedowns taken. Firms have reported discounts ranging from 0-73% of par value. IncrediMail, Ltd. proved the most extreme example of this as it booked an impairment of 98% off face value for its ARS holdings, while Berkshire Hathaway took no impairment on its more than $3.5 billion of these securities. Some of the higher-profile firms taking writedowns include Bristol-Myers Squibb, 3M and US Airways. Citigroup took a $1.5 billion loss on its inventory of auction rate securities.

Duke University Law School professor James Cox summed this discrepancy up: "I think some people act opportunistically, some people act optimistically and some people act fairly."

The valuation of auction rate securities has proved especially difficult as Bank of America and other brokerage houses refuse to assign a value to their clients’ holdings. UBS has presented clients with several different values for ARS. Also, Interactive Data Real Time Services, a provider of independent pricing services for the investment industry, discontinued the pricing of approximately 1,100 student-loan auction rate securities on May 5, 2008.

== See also ==
- Floating rate note
