= Global Financial Markets Association =

International financial industry organization

- Formation: 2009; 17 years ago
- Purpose: Trade Association
- Location: Washington, D.C., United States
- Region served: Global
- Website: www.gfma.org

The Global Financial Markets Association (GFMA) is a trade association for the securities and financial markets industry at the international level. It was created in 2009 as an umbrella group for three regional organizations:

- the Securities Industry and Financial Markets Association (SIFMA), based in New York City and Washington DC
- the Association for Financial Markets in Europe (AFME), based in Brussels, Frankfurt and London
- the Asian Securities Industry and Financial Markets Association (ASIFMA), based in Hong Kong.

The GFMA is one of the main channels of lobbying and advocacy for the financial services industry at the global level. It often takes policy positions together with peers such as the Financial Services Forum, Futures Industry Association, International Securities Lending Association, Bank Policy Institute, International Capital Market Association, Institute of International Finance, and International Swaps and Derivatives Association. Its research is frequently cited in financial services policy debates, even though as a trade body it may not always be viewed as providing a neutral point of view.

The GFMA's secretariat is provided on a rotating basis by the three regional organizations on two-year terms. In March 2022, Adam Farkas, Chief Executive of the Association for Financial Markets in Europe, became chief executive of GFMA on a two-year term.

== See also ==
- Investment banking
- Broker-dealer
- Stock market
- World Federation of Exchanges
- CCP Global
- World Forum of Central Securities Depositories
