= Tetsuya Ishikawa =

British banker (born 1979)

- Born: 1979 (age 46–47)
- Occupations: Author, former investment banker
- Known for: How I Caused the Credit Crunch (2009)

Tetsuya Ishikawa (born 1979) is a Japanese British author, financial journalist and a banker with Goldman Sachs. He was involved in selling collateralized debt obligations called Abacus-2007AC1 to the bank's clients while simultaneously betting against those complex securities. He later wrote a book published by Icon Books in 2009. It is unclear if Mr. Ishikawa read the book Liar's Poker, somewhat similar to his book, which makes mention of Michael Milken's Junk bond operations and convictions.

== Bibliography ==
- Ishikawa, Tetsuya (2009). How I Caused the Credit Crunch: An Insider's Story of the Financial Meltdown. London: Icon Books. ISBN 978-1-84831-067-4.
