= Alexandra Wallace =

American news media executive

Alexandra Wallace (born 1975 or 1976) is an American news media executive. Currently the Head of Media and Content at Verizon Media, she previously worked at CBS News and NBC News. While at NBC News, she became the first woman to be in charge of the Today Show in November 2012.

== Career ==
Wallace graduated from Columbia University, where she majored in English literature. After college, she spent a year in London. Wallace started her news career at CBS News's London bureau. With CBS, she worked on CBS Evening News and 48 Hours, before working as a senior producer for The Early Show.

After 17 years with CBS, Wallace joined NBC News in March 2005 working on Weekend Today as executive producer. In June 2006, Wallace was promoted, becoming deputy to NBC News president Steve Capus In spring 2007, she began working with Brian Williams as executive producer on NBC Nightly News with Brian Williams. She was tasked with improving the show's loss of viewership to its rival ABC News show World News with Charles Gibson. In October 2012, Wallace transitioned from serving another stint as Capus's deputy to being executive producer for Rock Center with Brian Williams. In November 2012, Wallace was put in charge of Today to try and reverse a ratings decline after the dismissal of former anchor Ann Curry. She became the first woman executive to run Today. In 2014, Wallace took over running Meet the Press during a period of poor ratings with former anchor David Gregory. By the time of her departure in July 2015, Wallace was deputy to NBC News president Deborah Turness.

In 2020, in her role as head of media and content for Verizon Media, Wallace took operational control of HuffPost after Lydia Polgreen's resignation as editor-in-chief.

Wallace has won 11 Emmy Awards, 2 Dupont Awards, a Gracie Award, a Peabody Award, as well as a John Jay Award for distinguished professional achievement from the Columbia College Alumni Association, for which she is a member of the board of directors. Wallace is a member of The Council on Foreign Relations as well as a CUP board member.

== Personal life ==
Wallace's husband is a private school administrator in Manhattan; As of May 2007, they had two children, a son and a daughter, together.
