= Deryck Maughan =

British businessman and philanthropist (born 1947)

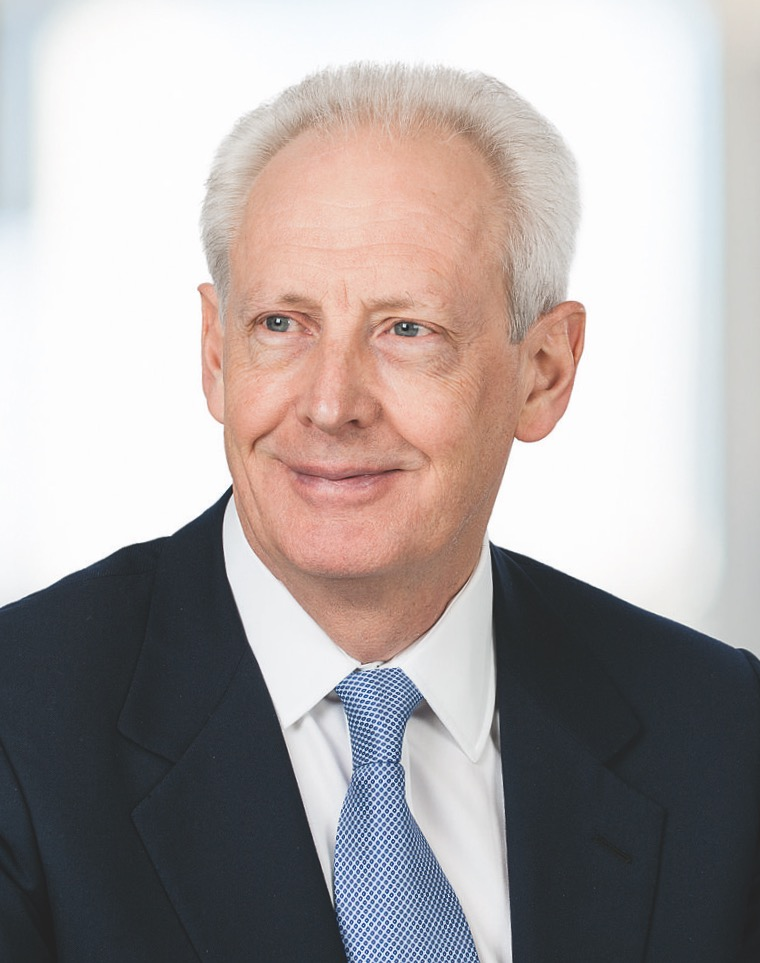
Sir Deryck Maughan

Sir Deryck Charles Maughan (born 20 December 1947) is an English businessman.

== Early life ==
Maughan was born in Consett, County Durham to a working class family. His father worked as a coal miner. He moved with his parents to Richmond, North Yorkshire, where they managed the Fleece Hotel. He attended Richmond Grammar School.

Maughan won a scholarship and studied sociology and geography at King's College London. He then earned a MS from Stanford Graduate School of Business in 1978, where he was a Harkness Fellow.

== Career ==
Maughan worked at HM Treasury from 1969. Considered the most elite of the British civil services, Maughan was one of only three men hired to join that year.

He went to work as a bond salesman at the London office of Goldman Sachs from 1979 to 1983.

Maughan left Goldman Sachs for Salomon Brothers in New York from 1983, where he worked as an international bond sales manager.

Salomon Brothers promoted Maughan to managing director of their small Asian subsidiary in 1986. It was here then Maughan made his reputation, as Solomon Brothers Asia grew into one of the top five securities firms in Japan, eventually accounting for 15 to 20 percent of Salomon Brothers profits. Maughan returned to New York from 1991.

Following a corporate scandal, acting-chairman and largest shareholder Warren Buffett promoted Maughan to chairman and CEO of Salomon Brothers from 1992 to 1997. Maughan was tasked with turning around the reputation of Salomon Brothers. He streamlined the business, with the loss of 150 jobs. Maughan also cut his salary, managing Salomon Brothers for less than he had earned as manager of the Asian operations.

Buffett has latterly been ebullient in his praise of Maughan, describing him as "my smartest hire". Buffett also said: "Deryck Maughan came in and I put him in total charge of running Salomon Brothers. And everything he did, you know, was perfect ... He was working 15-hour days. He never asked for any extra compensation of any kind."

During his tenure at Salomon Brothers, Maughan was profiled in New York Magazine as ""investment banking's Hamlet", boasting and optimistic and yet curiously passive and melancholic."

Maughan served as vice-chairman of the New York Stock Exchange from 1996 to 2000.

Maughan became Vice Chairman of Citigroup and CEO of Citigroup International from 1998 to 2004. Maughan resigned his position in 2004 after regulators discovered fraud and insufficient checks against money laundering at the Japanese subsidiary.

From 2005 Maughan was the chairman of the Asian subsidiary of Kohlberg Kravis Roberts & Co.

Maughan was appointed a director of BlackRock in 2006. He also served as a director of GlaxoSmithKline from 2004 to 2016 and Thomson Reuters from 2005.

Maughan retired in 2019.

== Personal life ==
Deryck Maughan married Lorraine V Hannemann, the sister of Mufi Hannemann, in Hawaii in 1981.

Maughan is a Trustee of the British Museum and serves on an Advisory Council at Stanford University. He has also served as a Trustee of Lincoln Center, Carnegie Hall and NYU Langone Medical Center. The Maughan Library of King's College is named after him.

== Honours ==
Maughan was knighted by Her Majesty the Queen in 2002 for his contribution to British interests in the United States.
