= Electronic Municipal Market Access =

The Electronic Municipal Market Access (EMMA) system, operated by the Municipal Securities Rulemaking Board (MSRB), serves as the official source for municipal securities disclosures and related financial data in the United States. EMMA provides free on-line access to centralized new issue municipal securities disclosure documents (known as official statements), on-going continuing disclosures for all municipal securities, escrow deposit agreements for advance refundings (i.e., refinancings) of outstanding bonds, real-time municipal bond trade price information, interest rates and auction results for municipal auction rate securities (the first free source for this kind of information on the auction rate securities market) and interest rate reset information for variable rate demand obligations, together with daily statistics on trading activity and investor education materials.

EMMA's disclosure collection operates in coordination with the MSRB's investor protection rules mandating that securities firms and banks selling municipal securities to customers provide them with complete disclosure of all important information about the investment. EMMA also is the central information utility through which municipal securities disclosures mandated by the Securities and Exchange Commission (SEC) through its Rule 15c2-12 are made freely available to the general public. The EMMA continuing disclosure service provides access to audited financial statements, default notices, taxability notices, notices of rating changes, and approximately 30 additional categories of financial and other updates relating to municipal securities. The MSRB and SEC continue to work toward expanding the types and timeliness of disclosures available through EMMA.

Public access to the integrated collection of primary market and secondary market disclosure provided through EMMA parallels the centralized disclosure currently available for securities offerings by public companies through the SEC's EDGAR system, although EMMA provides additional items of information beyond the base disclosures provided by EDGAR, such as trade prices, interest rates, market statistics and educational materials. The collection of disclosure documents available through EMMA for municipal securities is not identical to what is available through EDGAR for registered offerings of corporate or other securities since municipal securities and their state & local governmental issuers are afforded broad exemptions from most provisions of the federal securities laws (such as the Securities Act of 1933, the Securities Exchange Act of 1934 and the Investment Company Act of 1940) otherwise applicable to private-sector issuers of corporate and other types of securities.
