= William Salomon =

American businessman (1914–2014)

William Roger Salomon
- Born: April 2, 1914; New York City, New York, United States
- Died: December 7, 2014 (aged 100); New York City, New York, United States
- Occupation: Managing partner of Salomon Brothers
- Spouse: Virginia Foster
- Children: 2
- Parent: Percy Salomon

William Salomon (1914–2014) was an American businessman who served as managing partner of Salomon Brothers.

== Biography ==
Salomon was born to a Jewish family in New York City, the son of Percy Salomon who co-founded Salomon Brothers with his brothers, Arthur and Herbert. William joined the firm aged 19 in 1933, soon after the Wall Street crash. He became a managing partner in 1963 and turned the firm into one of the "fearsome foursome" with Lehman Brothers, Merrill Lynch and Blyth and Company, that took on the elite white shoe banks such as Morgan Stanley and First Boston".

He retired in 1978, passing the leadership to John Gutfreund, but regretted it when the latter led the partners into selling the firm for $554 million in 1981 to Phibro, a commodities trading house. He had prized the discipline of partnership, creating a structure in which partners were paid salaries and bonuses but had to retain 95 per cent of their capital in the business until they left.

== Personal life ==
In 1937, Salomon married Virginia Foster; they had two children, Dr. Peter F. Salomon and Susan Salomon Neiman. He died in 2014 at the age of 100.
