= Sense on Cents =

Financial blog

- Owner: Larry Doyle
- Website: www.senseoncents.com
- Launched: January 1, 2009; 17 years ago

Sense on Cents is a financial website and blog. It is authored and managed by Larry Doyle, a 23-year Wall Street veteran, and is found at www.senseoncents.com.

Sense on Cents was launched in January 2009. With close to 1 million visitors in three plus years, Doyle's writing emphasizes investor education and protection with regard to the economy, markets, and finance. In the blog, Doyle covers an extensive array of topics and writes in a style which is understandable for those with little to no financial/market experience to graduate level professors. He has addressed at length the scam embedded in auction-rate securities. Doyle referred to the marketing and distribution by Wall Street of auction-rate securities as "the single greatest fraud ever perpetrated on investors". He has also raised questions about Wall Street's self-regulatory organization, the Financial Industry Regulatory Authority (FINRA), in the blog.

Doyle's writing at Sense on Cents has led to his first book, In Bed with Wall Street: The Conspiracy Crippling Our Global Economy, to be published by Palgrave Macmillan in January 2014.

Doyle previously worked in the mortgage business, starting in 1983, for First Boston (as a mortgage-backed securities trader), Bear Stearns (where he was a senior managing director), and Union Bank of Switzerland (where he was head of mortgage trading), Bank of America, and JP Morgan Chase, where he was the National Sales Manager for Securitized Products.
