= E. Javier Loya =

Businessman and CEO of OTC Global Holdings

- Other name: Javier Loya
- Education: Columbia University
- Occupations: Serial Entrepreneur, Co-Founder of OTC Global Holdings, Chairman of GETCHOICE!, Minority Owner of the Houston Texans, Former College Football Player
- Years active: 2007–present
- Known for: CEO of OTC Global Holdings, Minority Owner of Houston Texans
- Spouse: Lucinda Vincent-Loya
- Children: 2

Enrique Javier Loya (born February 2, 1969) is a Mexican-American business entrepreneur, and former college football player. He is a minority owner of the NFL's Houston Texans. Loya was also the co-founder of independent commodity broker OTC Global Holdings, which was acquired by BGC Group in April 2025, and is the current Chairman of GETCHOICE!, a technology company serving the utilities industry.

== Education and family ==
Loya was born to Ana and Miguel Loya in El Paso, Texas. He was the second-youngest of seven children. After the war, his father worked at a Farah Manufacturing Co. plant and taught his children to prioritize education. Loya graduated from New York City's Columbia University with a Bachelor of Arts in political science in 1991.

Javier Loya is married to Lucinda Vincent-Loya, a prominent interior designer in Houston whom he met just as the energy executive was starting his own company. The couple has 2 children.

== Football career ==
Loya played for the Columbia Lions as a linebacker and a defensive end. On October 10, 1988, a five-year losing streak was broken against Princeton. Loya, as the Spectator reported the next day, contributed two sacks and eight tackles. He was a varsity letterman in all three of his varsity seasons and was named an Honorable Mention All-Ivy League Selection in 1990. He is tied with several other players for the fourth-most career fumble recoveries while playing for the Columbia Lions.

In 2002, Loya became the first Hispanic owner in the NFL after he purchased a minority stake in the Houston Texans. Loya also served as a member of the NFL’s diversity committee. As a proponent of the Rooney Rule he was involved in developing and recommending DEI policies to increase minority representation.

== Professional career ==
In 1994, Loya co-founded Choice! Energy LP Choice, an energy brokerage firm specializing in natural gas. He later acquired full control of the company in 2000. After Texas deregulated the power market in 2002, Loya launched a new company, Choice Energy Services.

In 2007, Loya co-founded OTC Global Holdings as a commodity brokerage. The company acquired Choice Natural Gas, Choice Power, and Choice Energy.

In 2015 he founded GETCHOICE!, a nationwide energy, telecom, and utility management company. GETCHOICE! offers technology-based solutions to help companies become "smarter and greener" by driving cost-efficiency and sustainability. Their services include strategic procurement, utility bill payment, risk management, budgeting, telecom & IT solutions, tax studies, and sustainability initiatives. They leverage proprietary technology to provide insights into infrastructure, consumption, usage patterns, pricing trends, and sustainability progress.

In September 2019, Loya, his wife Lucinda, and other Houston entrepreneurs launched a tequila brand called Veneno Tequila.

Loya has served on the Board of Regents for Texas Southern University as well as other charitable foundations across Houston.

== Philanthropy ==
Loya is a sponsor and member of the board of directors for the Greater Houston Senior Football Showcase, a charitable organization that organizes high school football scouting events.

In 2011, Loya founded the Greater El Paso Football Showcase Combine, which provided over $9 million in scholarships to over 100 high school senior athletes.

Loya has a personal connection to League of United Latin American Citizens; the organization helped his father regain a job after an unjust firing. His story embodies LULAC’s mission to fight for equity and justice.

In 2025, Javier Loya served as advisor for the Hosting Committee of the Official Hispanic Inaugural Ball for President Trump, held at the Omni Shoreham Hotel. The event, hosted by Bienvenido US, celebrated the significant contributions of Hispanic voters to President Trump's re-election and highlighted the growing influence of the Hispanic community in American politics, alongside the presence of Donald Trump Jr., Senator Ted Cruz and Argentina's President Javier Milei among many others.

== Legal Matters ==
In 2015, Choice Energy, filed a lawsuit against nine of their brokers for breach of contract. The nine brokers filed a countersuit claiming they were forced to resign due to unpaid commissions and hostile work environment. All but one broker settled out of court.

During the Choice Energy lawsuit, Javier was accused of being a high-stakes gambler along with other Choice Energy employees and clients, which sparked an investigation from the NFL due to Javier's ownership of the Houston Texans. According to the NFL Ownership Guidelines, it is a violation for owners or employees of any NFL team to take part in any gambling.

In late December 2019, John Klosek, one of the founding members of OTC Global Holdings, filed a lawsuit against the CEO Javier Loya, COO Joseph Kelly, and several employees. The lawsuit was over extravagant personal spending decreasing the company's value to a negative net worth. Loya and the other accusees denied the allegations. The lawsuit was dismissed in May 2021.

In August 2023, it was revealed to major media outlets that Loya was charged with multiple counts of sexual misconduct and abuse. According to the Texans and the National Football League, Loya was suspended from team activities since May 2023.

In April 2024, the court issued a resolution where the prosecution dismissed all seven counts. Loya did agree to an Alford plea charging him with 'harassment with intent to annoy', a class B misdemeanor, and paid a $100 fine. To date, Loya maintains his innocence.

== Awards ==
- In 2002, Loya received the “Entrepreneur of the Year” Award from the Houston Hispanic Chamber of Commerce.
- In 2004, Javier was given the John Jay Award for distinguished professional achievement by his former university, Columbia University.
- In 2007, Javier received the “Emerging Leader” Award from the Greater Houston Partnership.
- In 2017, Loya was honored as a distinguished graduate by the Ivy Football Association at its bi-annual dinner at the Sheraton New York Times Square Hotel.
