= Lewis Ranieri =

American businessman

- Born: January 18, 1947 (age 79); Brooklyn, New York, U.S.
- Education: St. John's University, New York (BA)
- Occupations: Bond trader Banker
- Employer(s): Ranieri Partners, Salomon Brothers
- Known for: Securitization; Mortgage-backed securities

Lewis S. Ranieri (/rəniˈɛri/; born 1947) is a former bond trader, and founding partner and current chairman of Ranieri Partners, a real estate firm.

He is considered the "father" of mortgage-backed securities, along with Anthony J. Nocella, former CEO of Franklin Bank, for his pioneering role in their emergence in the 1970s during his tenure in Salomon Brothers, where he reached the position of Vice Chairman. Although he was named by BusinessWeek in 2004 as "one of the greatest innovators of the past 75 years", he was later strongly criticized for his role in the subprime mortgage crisis of 2007–09.

== Early life ==
Lewis S. Ranieri was born in Brooklyn, New York, in 1947. Ranieri had sought to be an Italian chef before finding that his asthma prevented him from working in smoky kitchens. He began college at St. John's University but left before completing his degree. Ranieri later returned to school and completed his Bachelor of Arts in English in 1986. In 1987, St. John's University awarded him an honorary Doctor of Laws degree.

== Career ==
In 1968, 21-year-old Ranieri took a part-time job in the mail room of Salomon Brothers. He worked his way to the position of vice chairman, as discussed in Michael Lewis' bestseller Liar's Poker. In the late 1970s, Ranieri joined the new mortgage-trading desk of Salomon Brothers where he contributed to creating the innovative practice of securitization, a word he is said to have coined. BusinessWeek said that in 1977, with the creation of mortgage-backed securities (MBS), "Ranieri's job was to sell those bonds—at a time when only 15 states recognized MBS as legal investments. With a trader's nerve and a salesman's persuasiveness, he did much more, creating the market to trade MBS and winning Washington lobbying battles to remove legal and tax barriers." Ranieri also declared that "mortgages are math", hiring PhDs who developed the collateralized mortgage obligation (CMO), repackaging mortgages into more attractive bonds.

By 1981, American savings and loan (S&Ls) were battered by high inflation as well as the high interest rates charged by the Federal Reserve under chairman Paul Volcker, but Congress allowed S&Ls to hide some of their losses by moving assets off their books. Ranieri bought mortgages from one S&L and sold them to another, allowing Wall Street to become involved in the home mortgage market (and profit from the spread). He convinced Freddie Mac to assist with a deal which packaged older loans from Perpetual Savings, a troubled S&L in the Washington D.C. area. However, institutional investors only became attracted to the market when he and Larry Fink of First Boston created the CMO in 1983. In 1984, Congress passed the Secondary Mortgage Market Enhancement Act (SMMEA), overturning the previous prohibition against private banks selling mortgage-backed securities without a government guarantee. It also pre-empted state blue sky laws which had previously required investment banks to register with multiple states before selling them. Furthermore, institutional investors could purchase mortgage-backed securities, provided a nationally recognized statistical rating organization (NRSRO) gave them a high rating; in effect allowing those investors to outsource their due diligence to such agencies. Ranieri attended the ceremony in which President Ronald Reagan signed SMMEA.

Ranieri also secured a tax exemption applicable to pools of mortgages held by a REMIC. Legalized by the Tax Reform Act of 1986, the mortgage-backed securities market reached $150 billion in 1986. However, Salomon Brothers fired Ranieri in 1987, which some characterized as him becoming a victim of his own success, since his old traders staffed many Wall Street investment banks.

Ranieri formed Hyperion Partners, an investment firm, in 1988. In 2001, Ranieri and his partners at Hyperion sold Bank United of Texas, a firm they acquired in the late 1980s. Under Ranieri's leadership as chairman of the board, Bank United went from having been a failed savings and loan to being a successful $18 billion asset regional bank at the time of sale.

As mortgage-backed securities came under scrutiny for their role in the subprime mortgage crisis, the United States housing bubble and the 2008 financial crisis, critics took aim at Ranieri. In March 2007, at a time when it was unknown whether or not the over-extension of leverage inherent in subprime mortgages could lead to a financial crisis, Ranieri commented "I think [the risk] is containable. I don't think this is going to be a cataclysm." That same year, he launched Selene Finance LP, a mortgage servicer that sought to prevent residents from being foreclosed on.

Ranieri commented on the situation in a 2009 interview, arguing that it "wasn't the concept of securitization that created the problem". Rather, he blamed Wall Street for misusing securitization to create mortgage products that homeowners were unable to afford over the long term, such as those with low 'teaser' rates that became unaffordable when they reset. In the same interview, Ranieri also explained his firm's ongoing efforts to rehabilitate the US housing market by purchasing delinquent mortgages, working with the original homeowners to establish consistent payments, and then selling the newly stabilized loans.

== Relationship with Jeffrey Epstein ==
Between the late 1990's and early 2000's, Ranieri is one of many men who had dinner with Epstein in his New York City mansion.

In August 2019, Ranieri was publicly linked to Epstein's 'little black book', which is also located the Epstein Files (the 'little black book')

== Philanthropy ==
In 2005, Ranieri was appointed by Roman Catholic Bishop William Murphy of the Diocese of Rockville Centre to form Tomorrow's Hope Foundation, a nonprofit organization whose mission is to provide assistance to the Catholic elementary and secondary schools of the diocese. The foundation has provided scholarships to thousands of families seeking Catholic education for their children. Ranieri continues to serve as chairman of the foundation.

== Recognition ==
Ranieri received the Distinguished Industry Service Award from the American Securitization Forum in 2005 and has participated in the National Association of Home Builders Mortgage Roundtable since 1989. Ranieri has also been inducted into the National Housing Hall of Fame and received the Lifetime Achievement Award given by the Fixed Income Analysts Society, Inc. In 2012, St. John's University awarded Ranieri the Spirit of Service award for his work with Tomorrow's Hope Foundation and his dedication to serving others.

Ranieri is portrayed by actor Rudy Eisenzopf at the beginning of the film The Big Short (adapted from Michael Lewis' book of the same name), which dramatized the events leading up to the 2007–08 housing crisis.
