= George Jaffin =

George Monroe Jaffin (May 4, 1905 – December 23, 1999) was an American attorney, real estate investor, art patron, and philanthropist.

== Education ==
Jaffin was the son of Lithuanian immigrants and grew up in Harlem. He attended Townsend Harris High School, received his bachelor's degree from Columbia College in 1924 as well as his law degree from Columbia Law School in 1927.

== Career ==
As a real estate investor and lawyer, he founded the firm now known as Jaffin, Conrad & Finkelstein. According to The New York Times, he was best known "as a contributor to and fundraiser for Columbia University, the Hospital for Joint Diseases, the Juilliard School and the Museum of Modern Art".

He served as the chairman of the development committee of the Hospital for Joint Diseases. He played an instrumental in the capital expansion of the Hospital for Joint Diseases, allowing the hospital to increase expenditure in research and move from its original location in East Harlem to its current location at 17th Street and Second Avenue, today known as the NYU Langone Orthopedic Hospital.

As a benefactor to Columbia Law School, he contributed $1.5 million to establish the Loan Repayment Assistance Program (LRAP) in 1985, which forgives the student loans of those graduates who practice public interest law. According to Columbia Law School dean Albert J. Rosenthal, the program one of the first such programs in the nation.

He also represented several artists and developed a strong relationship with Israeli artist Yaacov Agam, and donated his work to the Museum of Modern Art, the Israel Museum, Hebrew Union College, and the Juilliard School, which prominently displays his work outside its Lincoln Center campus.

== Awards ==
In 1991, he and his wife, Janet, received the Anti-Defamation League's Distinguished Public Service Award. He was also the recipient of Columbia College's John Jay Award in 1986 along with former NBC News president Richard Wald, MBNA chairman and Cleveland Browns owner Al Lerner, former Director of Policy Planning Morton Halperin, and Golden Globe-winning actor Brian Dennehy.

== Personal life ==
Jaffin died on December 23, 1999, in White Plains, New York. He was survived by his wife, and three children.
