= Eurofi =

European trade association and lobby group for the European financial industry

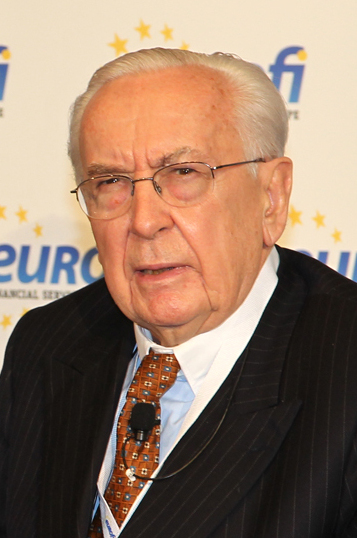
- Jacques de Larosière at a Eurofi meeting in 2011
- Formation: 2000; 26 years ago
- Type: Trade association and Think tank
- Legal status: Trade association for financial services
- Purpose: To lobby the EU policy makers on behalf of its members
- Location: Paris, France
- Region served: Europe
- Members: 100+ financial companies
- Secretary General: Didier Cahen
- Funding: Membership fees
- Website: www.eurofi.net

Eurofi is a Paris-based nonprofit trade association that organizes non-public gatherings on European economic and financial policy. Eurofi meetings have become a regular venue for exchange between EU economic and financial policymakers and senior financial sector executives.

It has been described by its founding co-chairman Jacques de Larosière as "the go-to forum for dialogue between regulators and financial institutions." In a 2019 feature article, the Financial Times called it "the think tank at the heart of the EU" while adding: "Although it describes itself as a think-tank, Eurofi defies categorisation."

== History and activity ==
Eurofi was created in 2000, following a suggestion from French finance minister Laurent Fabius. It was led from the start by French consultant Didier Cahen. It was initially co-chaired by Daniel Lebègue and Jacques de Larosière. Lebègue left in 2011, and in 2016 David Wright, former head of the European Commission's Directorate-General for the Internal Market (now DG FISMA), succeeded Larosière as Eurofi chair.

The main meetings organized by Eurofi are held twice a year, on the side of the informal ECOFIN meeting under the rotating presidency of the Council of the European Union: the "high-level seminar" in March or April, and the "financial forum" in September.

The meetings are not public. Public officials who speak at Eurofi often publish the text of their speech on their own institution's website. Eurofi itself publishes curated summaries of the discussions, as well as articles by featured speakers assembled in twice-yearly volumes branded Views Magazine.

Eurofi is mainly financed by yearly subscriptions from its member organizations, most of which are financial firms. It had 66 members in 2019 and a budget above €3 million. It lists all member firms on its website.

== Controversy ==
A full-page investigative article published by the Financial Times in September 2019 raised questions about the nature and role of Eurofi. It criticized Eurofi for lack of transparency, as its events have been closed to journalists since 2013; for letting its agenda be dominated by the special interests of the financial industry, particularly since 2010; for maintaining ambiguity about its official status, e.g. by using the logo of the six-month presidency of the Council; and for the high level of compensation of its consultant staff. It also observed that "Many EU officials contacted by the FT see going to Eurofi as part of their job."

== See also ==
- European Union lobbying
- International Monetary Conference
