= Liar's Poker =

1989 book by Michael Lewis

- Original 1989 hardcover jacket
- Author: Michael Lewis
- Language: English
- Genre: Economics
- Publisher: W. W. Norton & Company
- Publication date: October 17, 1989
- Publication place: United States
- Media type: Hardcover
- Pages: 256
- ISBN: 9780393027501
- OCLC: 19321697
- Followed by: The Money Culture

Liar's Poker is a non-fiction, semi-autobiographical book by Michael Lewis describing the author's experiences as a bond salesman on Wall Street during the late 1980s.

First published in 1989, it is considered one of the books that defined Wall Street during the 1980s, along with Bryan Burrough and John Helyar's Barbarians at the Gate: The Fall of RJR Nabisco, and the fictional The Bonfire of the Vanities by Tom Wolfe. The book captures an important period in the history of Wall Street. Two important figures in that history feature prominently in the text, the head of Salomon Brothers' mortgage department Lewis Ranieri and the firm's CEO John Gutfreund.

The book's name is taken from liar's poker, a gambling game popular with the bond traders in the book.

== Synopsis ==
The narrative of Liar's Poker jumps back and forth between two different threads.

One thread is autobiographical: it follows Lewis through his college education, his hiring by Salomon Brothers (now a subsidiary of Citigroup) in 1984, and his training at the firm. It is a first-person account of the personalities, workplace practices, and culture of bond traders. Several high-ranking Salomon Brothers employees of the era, such as arbitrageur John Meriwether, mortgage department head Lewis Ranieri, and firm CEO John Gutfreund, feature prominently.

The book's other thread gives an overview of Wall Street history before focusing on the history of Salomon Brothers in particular. This thread is less dependent on Lewis' personal experience and features quotes drawn from interviews. It is primarily concerned with how the Salomon Brothers firm almost single-handedly created a market for mortgage bonds that made the firm wealthy, only to be outdone by Michael Milken and his junk bonds.

=== Biographical section ===
Lewis was an art history student at Princeton University who wanted to break into Wall Street to make money. He describes his almost pathetic attempts to find a finance job, only to be roundly rejected by every firm to which he applied. For example, in 1982 Lehman Brothers had rejected his employment application. He then enrolled in the London School of Economics to gain a master's degree in economics.

While in England, Lewis was invited to a banquet hosted by the Queen Mother, where his cousin, Baroness Linda Monroe von Stauffenberg, one of the organizers of the banquet, purposefully seated him next to the wife of the London managing partner of Salomon Brothers. Lewis's cousin hoped that his intelligence might impress the partner's wife enough to suggest to her husband that Lewis be given a job with Salomon Brothers. The strategy worked, and Lewis was granted an interview and subsequently received a job offer.

Lewis then moved to New York City for Salomon's training program. Here he was appalled at the sophomoric, obtuse and obnoxious behavior of some of his fellow trainees as they were indoctrinated into the money culture of Salomon Brothers and the Wall Street culture as a whole.

From New York, Lewis was shipped off to the London office of Salomon Brothers as a bond salesman. Despite his lack of knowledge, he was soon handling millions of dollars in investment accounts. In 1987 he witnessed a near-hostile takeover of Salomon Brothers but survived with his job. However, growing disillusioned with his work, Lewis quit the firm at the beginning of 1988 to write this book and become a financial journalist. The book was published October 17, 1989.

=== Wall Street culture ===
The book is an unflattering portrayal of Wall Street traders and salesmen, their personalities, their beliefs and their work practices.

During the training sessions, Lewis was struck by the infantilism of most of his fellow trainees. Examples included: yelling at and insulting financial experts who talked to them; throwing spit balls at one another and at lecturers; calling phone sex lines and then broadcasting them over the company's intercom; gambling on behavioral traits (such as how long it took certain trainees to fall asleep during lectures); and the trainees' incredible lust for money and contempt for any position that did not earn much.

Lewis attributed the bond traders' and salesmen's behavior to the fact that the trading floor required neither finesse nor advanced financial knowledge, but rather, the ability and desire to exploit others' weaknesses, to intimidate others into listening to traders and salesmen, and the ability to spend hours a day screaming orders under high-pressure situations. He referred to their worldview as "The Law of the Jungle".

He also noted that, although most arrivals on Wall Street had studied economics, this knowledge was never used. In fact, any academic knowledge was frowned on by traders.

Lewis also attributed the savings and loan scandal of the 1980s and 1990s to the inability of inexperienced and provincial small-town bank managers to compete with Wall Street. He described people on Wall Street as masters at taking advantage of an undiscerning public, which the savings and loan industry provided in abundance.

=== Catch phrases ===
- Big Swinging Dick — A big-time trader or salesman. ("If he could make millions of dollars come out of those phones, he became that most revered of all species: a Big Swinging Dick". p. 56.) The opposite of this term is Geek, used to refer to a just-hired trainee.
- Equities in Dallas — A particularly undesirable job within a finance firm. ("Thus, Equities in Dallas became training program shorthand for 'Just bury that lowest form of human scum where it will never be seen again'." p. 58.)
- Blowing up a customer — Convincing a customer to purchase an investment product which ends up declining rapidly in value, forcing the client to end up withdrawing from the market.
- Feeding Frenzy — The Friday-morning meal shared by a certain clique of bond traders. At this meal, traders would order astounding quantities of take-out food, far more than they could eat (e.g., five-gallon tubs of guacamole with an order of $400 worth of Mexican food). The traders would then compete with each other to see who could display the most gluttony.
- The Human Piranha — Nickname for an employee at Salomon Brothers who constantly used the word "fuck" and its variants in his speech. A reference to Tom Wolfe's character in The Bonfire of the Vanities.
- No Tears — Used to describe a preset alternate rule Michael Lewis describes in the book, John Gutfreund challenges John Meriwether to a game of liar's poker, in which he states "no tears" which means players of the game who lose can't complain about losing afterwards.

== Reception ==
Despite the book's quite unflattering depiction of Wall Street firms and many of the people who worked there, many younger readers were fascinated by the life depicted. Many read it as a "how-to manual" and asked the author for additional secrets that he might care to share.

== See also ==
- The Predators' Ball by Connie Bruck
- Den of Thieves by James B. Stewart
- Discussion Materials by Bill Keenan
- When Genius Failed by Roger Lowenstein
- Too Big to Fail by Andrew Ross Sorkin
- The Big Short by Michael Lewis
- The Smartest Guys in the Room by Bethany McLean and Peter Elkind
