= Elizabeth Rubin =

American journalist

Elizabeth Rubin is an American journalist. She is a contributing writer for The New York Times Magazine. She has traveled through and written about Afghanistan, Russia, Chechnya, Pakistan, Saudi Arabia, Iraq, Israel, Palestine, Uganda, Sierra Leone, South Africa, and the former Yugoslavia. Her stories have appeared in The Atlantic Monthly, The New York Times Magazine, The New Republic, Harper's Magazine, Vogue and The New Yorker. She lives in New York City.

== Personal life ==
The daughter of publisher Harvey Rubin and his wife Judith, Rubin was raised in Larchmont, New York and earned a B.A. at Columbia University and an M.Phil. at Oxford University. She is the sister of former diplomat and journalist and executive editor at Bloomberg News, James Rubin who served under President Bill Clinton as Assistant Secretary of State for Public Affairs and Chief Spokesman for the State Department.

== Career ==
Rubin started her career reviewing theater at the Vineyard Gazette on Martha's Vineyard, before moving to The Forward as deputy cultural editor. In 1994 she went to Sarajevo for a six-week stint which lasted nearly two years. Her reportage in Harper's about private armies, diamond wars, and state collapse in Sierra Leone was a National Magazine Award finalist and earned an Overseas Press Club citation for excellence. After 9/11, she covered the U.S. wars in Afghanistan and Iraq for The New Republic and wrote about Russians, Chechens, Saudis, Iraqis, Iranians, and Americans abroad for The New York Times Magazine, where she is a contributing writer.

== Awards ==
Rubin is a 2004-2005 Nieman Fellow. At The New Yorker, she won the Livingston Award for International Reporting for her story about a Ugandan rebel army of kidnapped children. She was a 2008–2009 Edward R. Murrow Press Fellow.
