= Securities Industry and Financial Markets Association =

United States industry trade group

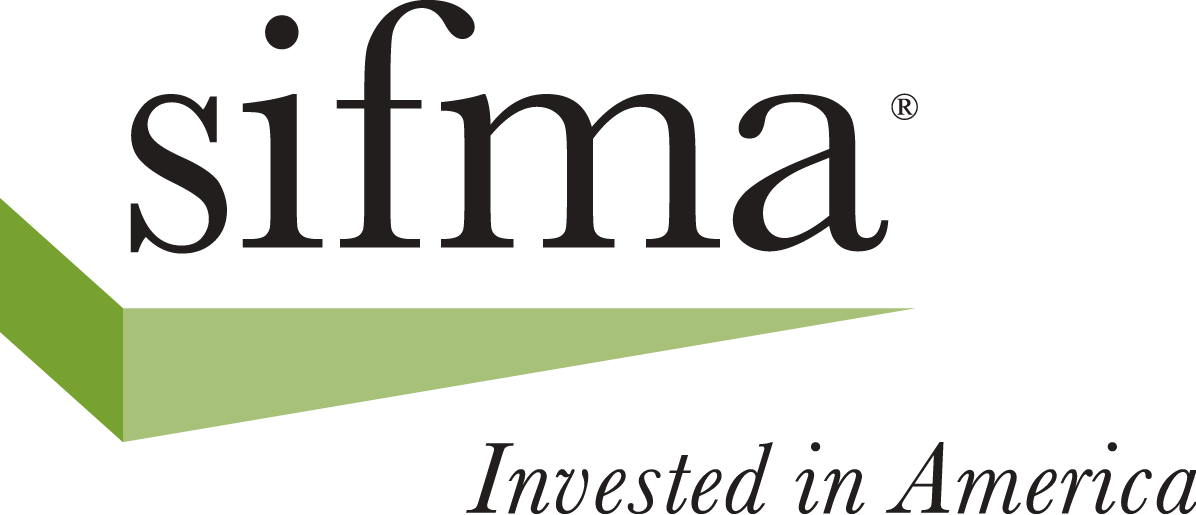
- Founded: November 1, 2006; 19 years ago
- Type: Trade group & advocacy group
- Method: Political lobbying, public relations
- President and CEO: Kenneth E. Bentsen, Jr.
- Expenses: $175,893,100 (2015)
- Website: www.sifma.org

The Securities Industry and Financial Markets Association (SIFMA) is a United States industry trade group representing securities firms, banks, and asset management companies. SIFMA was formed on November 1, 2006, from the merger of the Bond Market Association and the Securities Industry Association. It has offices in New York City and Washington, D.C.

The combined businesses of SIFMA’s bank, broker-dealer and asset management members represent 75% of the U.S. broker-dealer sector by revenue and 50% of the asset management sector by assets under management.

== Mission, members, and offices ==
=== US operation ===
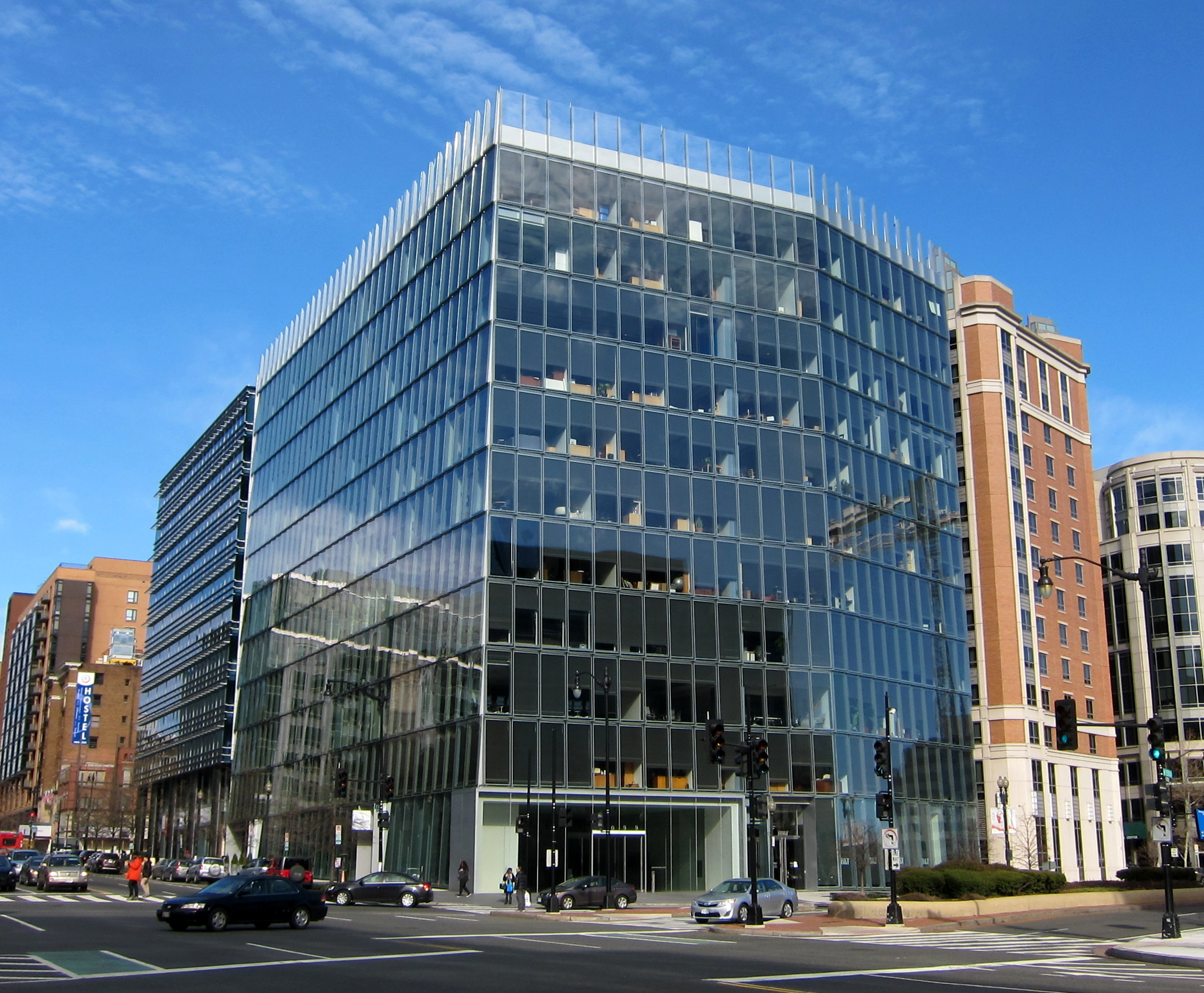
SIFMA's Washington offices are at 1099 New York Avenue NW.

The Securities Industry and Financial Markets Association (SIFMA) is a not-for-profit trade association that represents securities brokerage firms, investment banking institutions, and other investment firms. SIFMA represents firms of all sizes in all financial markets in the U.S. and around the globe.

Currently, the organization represents the industry's 1 million employees, serving clients. They handle more than $185 trillion in assets and manage more than $67 trillion in assets for individual and institutional clients. These clients include mutual funds and retirement plans, as well as banks and brokerage firms. The organization’s members consist of more than 13,000 professionals in the finance and banking industries.

==== Political Advocacy and Lobbying ====
SIFMA's political action committees (PACs) gave $789,584 in political contributions during the 2020 election cycle. The organization advocates to lawmakers on issues ranging from infrastructure spending, Department of Labor regulations, and SEC rulings.

== Senior management ==
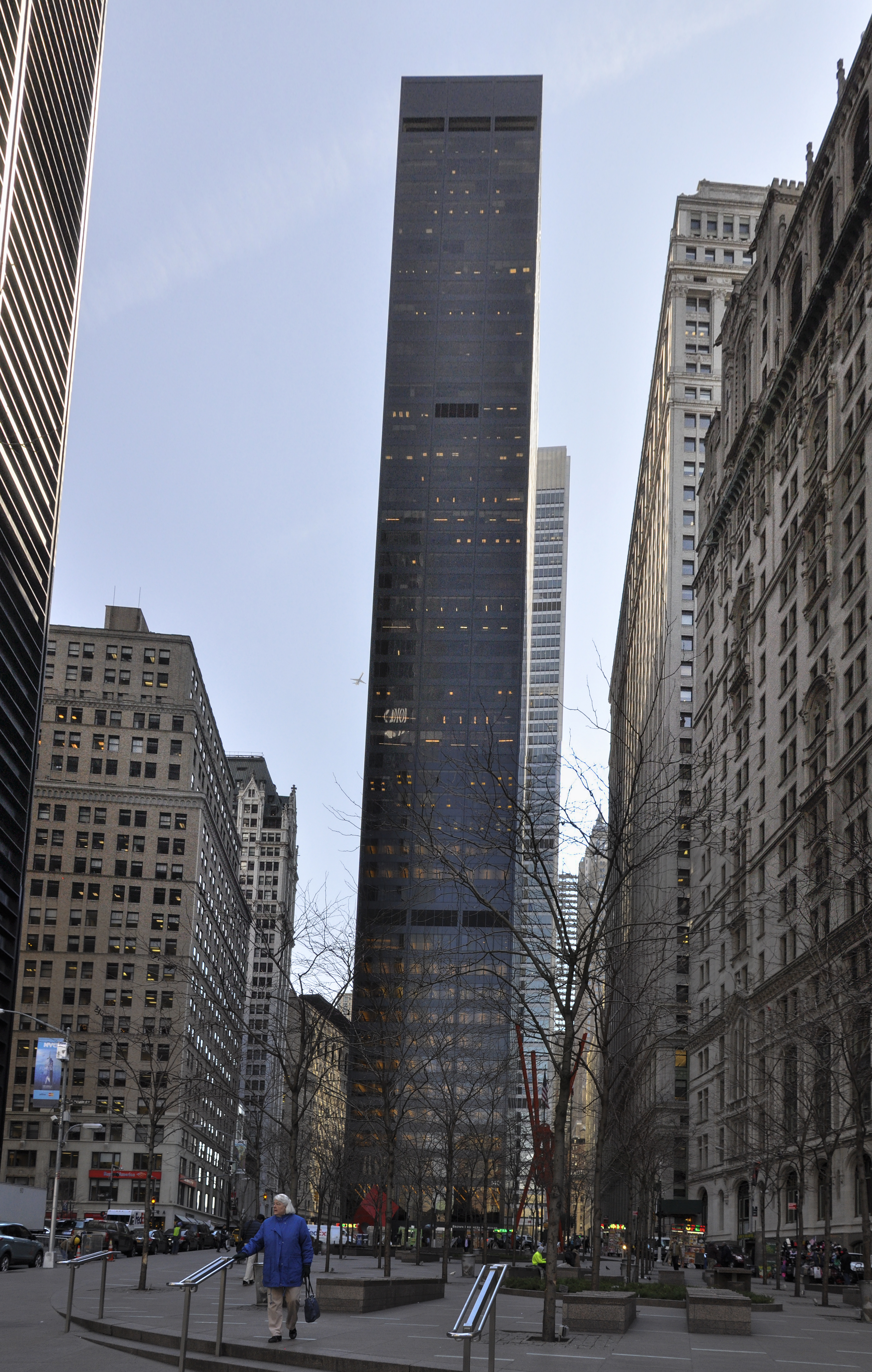
SIFMA's New York offices are located at 140 Broadway.

Kenneth E. Bentsen, Jr., a former U.S. Congressman, is SIFMA's CEO & President. In 2014, he also replaced Simon Lewis, CEO of the Association for Financial Markets in Europe (AFME), as the CEO of Global Financial Markets Association (GFMA), the umbrella group for AFME, ASIFMA, and SIFMA. ASIFMA is the Asian Securities Industry and Financial Markets Association.

Other members of SIFMA’s senior management consists of Joseph L. Seidel (Chief Operating Officer), David Krasner(Chief Financial and Chief Administrative Officer), Salvatore Chiarelli (Head of Conferences and Events), Cheryl Crispen (Communications and Marketing), Saima A. Ahmed (General Counsel) and Josh Wilsusen (Advocacy).

In August 2008, SIFMA hired Michael Paese, former Deputy Staff Director of the Committee on Financial Services of the House of Representatives, as EVP, Global Advocacy; eight months later Paese left SIFMA to become director of government affairs at Goldman Sachs. Scott DeFife, who had reported to Paese, left SIFMA in December 2009.

After the 2006 merger which created SIFMA, the organization had a co-CEO structure, with the SIA's Marc E. Lackritz and BMA's Micah S. Green filling the positions. As a 2007 report summarized it, "Lackritz [then 60] ha[d] been a friend, colleague and mentor of Green's [then 49] for two decades." However, with slower-than-hoped-for integration of the merged organization's operations, and with questions about the handling of executive loans by BMA, Green resigned abruptly that year and Lackritz assumed the role of sole CEO. Nine months later, Lackritz retired and T. Timothy Ryan Jr. was named CEO.

== Board of directors ==
SIFMA’s Board of Directors manages the business and affairs of the Association. Board members are either the chief executive officer of a SIFMA member firm, or a designee of such chief executive officer. All Board members have the authority to represent the views of their firms and are elected on a staggered basis by the SIFMA membership.

The board consists of Chairman Jim Reynolds (Loop Capital Markets), Chair-Elect Ken Cella (Edward Jones), Vice-Chair Laura Peters Chepucavage (Bank of America), and Treasurer Lisa Kidd Hunt (Charles Schwab).

== Finances ==
In 2007 SIFMA had $105 million in both revenues and expenses. SIFMA's highest-paid officers that year were Donald Kittel (then CFO), $2.1 million, Marc Lackritz (then president & CEO), $1.5 million, and Randolph Snook (SMD), $1.1 million.

SIFMA's highest-paid officer in 2008 was its new president and CEO Tim Ryan (at approximately $2 million, for January–October). Ryan had been hired to replace Lackritz in January 2008, at a 43% ($600,000) higher level of compensation, for less than a full year. Ryan wrote in a USA Today editorial in August 2009 that compensation practices at financial services firms should align with long-term, not short-term, performance.

SIFMA's top-three highest-paid officers in the fiscal year ending October 31, 2009 were CEO Tim Ryan at $2.43 million, Executive Vice President Randolph Snook at $1.04 million, and General Counsel Ira Hammerman at $777,000. SIFMA received total revenue that year of $75 million, had total expenses of $82 million, and finished the year with a fund balance of $40 million. In 2011, Ryan's compensation was the highest among the leaders of 22 self-regulatory, dealer, governmental, and other groups in the municipal bond market, at $3.0 million.

CEO Tim Ryan earned $2.51 million base compensation (and $2.89 million total compensation) for the fiscal year ended October 31, 2012, more than the compensation of any of the officials heading the other 20 self-regulatory, industry, government, and other municipal securities-related groups. His compensation was far higher than that of the Securities and Exchange Commission Chairman Mary Jo White, who earned $165,300. Executive Vice President Ken Bentsen received a total of $1.12 million, and Randy Snook received $1.04 million.
