= John Gutfreund =

American banker, businessman, and investor

- Born: John Halle Gutfreund; September 14, 1929; Scarsdale, New York, U.S.
- Died: March 9, 2016 (aged 86); New York City, U.S.
- Education: Oberlin College (BA)
- Occupations: Investment banker, businessman and investor
- Employer: Salomon Brothers
- Spouse(s): Joyce Low; later, Susan Kaposta Penn
- Children: 4
- Military career
- Allegiance: United States
- Branch: United States Army
- Service years: 1951-1953
- Rank: First lieutenant
- Unit: Military Police Corps
- Conflicts: Korean War

John Halle Gutfreund (Note: pronounced "goodfriend") (September 14, 1929 – March 9, 2016) was an American banker, businessman, and investor. He was the CEO of Salomon Brothers Inc., an investment bank that gained prominence in the 1980s. Gutfreund turned Salomon Brothers from a private partnership into a publicly traded corporation, which started a trend in Wall Street for investment companies to go public.

In 1985, Business Week gave him the nickname "King of Wall Street".

== Early life and education ==
Gutfreund grew up in a Jewish family in Scarsdale, a suburb of New York City. His father, Manuel Gutfreund, was the owner of a prosperous trucking company. He attended the Lawrenceville School. In 1951, Gutfreund graduated from Oberlin College in Ohio with a degree in English. He considered teaching literature but instead joined the Army. In 1953, he was discharged.

His father belonged to the Century Country Club in Purchase, New York, a predominantly German Jewish club at the time. There, he often golfed with William "Billy" Salomon, the son of Percy Salomon, one of the three founding brothers of Salomon Brothers.

== Career ==
At Billy Salomon's invitation, the young Gutfreund joined Salomon Brothers as a trainee in the statistical department. After several months, Gutfreund became a clerk in the municipal bond department, eventually becoming a trader. He rose quickly through the company and became a full partner at the age of thirty-four.

In 1978, Billy Salomon named Gutfreund to succeed him as head of the firm, becoming the highest paid Wall Street executive at the time. Besides his executive office on the 43rd floor of 1 New York Plaza, Gutfreund frequently occupied a two-person desk at the head of the massive, double-decker 41st floor fixed income trading floor, known as 'the Room', where Gutfreund would regularly give advice to individual traders.

In early 1991, when Gutfreund was CEO of Salomon Brothers, a major scandal took place regarding the way Treasury bond trading was done by Salomon. Paul Mozer, head of the Government Bond desk at Salomon Brothers, was submitting bids in excess of what was allowed by the Treasury rules. When this was discovered and brought to the attention of Gutfreund, he did not immediately suspend Mr. Mozer. The exposure of Mr. Mozer's repeated violations of U.S. government bond auction rules resulted in a significant scandal during which regulators and some politicians called on the firm to be stripped of its Primary Dealer status. This action would have threatened the survival of the firm, then the largest participant in the U.S. government and mortgage bond trading markets.

Warren Buffett, who through Berkshire Hathaway had recently acquired a $700 million preferred equity position in Salomon, became alarmed by the activities of the firm. Buffett actively took measures with Salomon in order to protect his investment, including briefly being CEO of Salomon Brothers. As a result of the scandal, Gutfreund and other senior managers of Salomon were forced to resign in 1991.

From January 2002, Gutfreund was senior managing director and executive committee member of the investment bank C.E. Unterberg, Towbin. He was also president of Gutfreund & Company, a New York-based financial consulting firm that specialized in advising corporations and financial institutions in the US, Europe and Asia.

== Legacy ==
Gutfreund was featured prominently in the 1989 book Liar's Poker by Michael Lewis, a former employee of Salomon. Gutfreund would later tell Lewis that "Your fucking book destroyed my career, and it made yours."

The UJA-Federation of New York honored him for his charitable activities and contributions.

== Personal life ==
He was on the board of trustees at the New York Public Library for many years.

Gutfreund was married twice:

- In 1958, he married Joyce Low, the daughter of Teddy Low, a partner at Bear Stearns. They had three sons: Nick (b.1959), Josh (b.1961), and Owen (b.1963).
- In 1981, he married flight attendant Susan Penn (maiden name Kaposta) (b. 1946), the daughter of a Hungarian American, US Air Force pilot father and a Spanish American mother. They had one child, John Peter (b. 1985).

Gutfreund died on 9 March 2016, aged 86.
