= James Rubin =

American diplomat and journalist (born 1960)

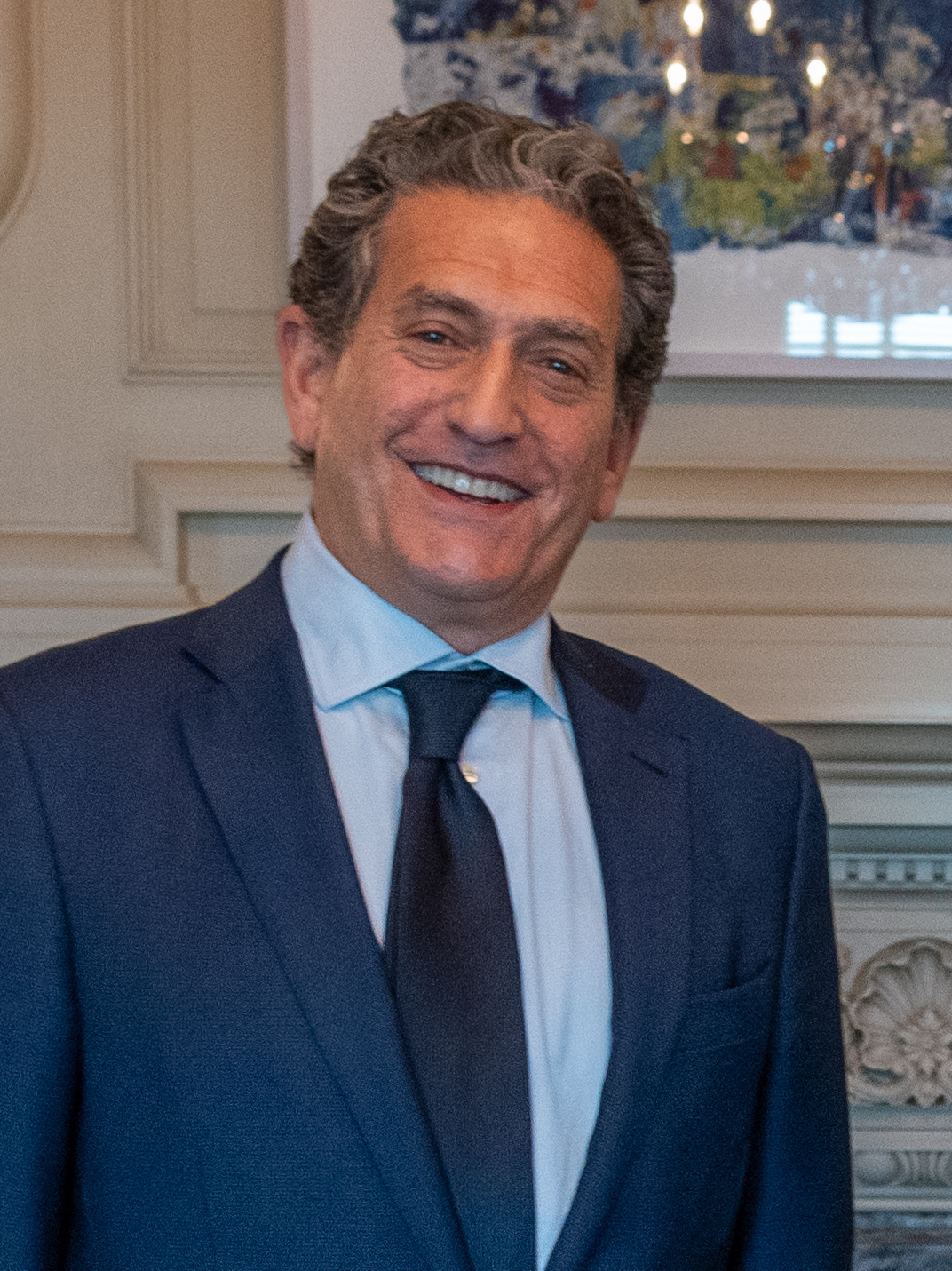

23rd Assistant Secretary of State for Public Affairs
- In office August 7, 1997 – April 2, 2000
- President: Bill Clinton
- Preceded by: Thomas E. Donilon
- Succeeded by: Richard Boucher

17th Spokesperson for the United States Department of State
- In office 1997–2000
- Preceded by: R. Nicholas Burns
- Succeeded by: Richard Boucher

Personal details
- Born: James Phillip Rubin; March 28, 1960 (age 66) Larchmont, New York, U.S.
- Party: Democratic
- Spouse: Christiane Amanpour (m. 1998; div. 2018)
- Children: 1
- Relatives: Elizabeth Rubin (sister)
- Education: Columbia University (BA, MIA); Boston University

James Phillip Rubin (born March 28, 1960) is an American former diplomat and journalist who served as U.S. assistant secretary of state for public affairs in the Clinton administration from 1997 to 2000. He wrote a regular column on foreign affairs for The Sunday Times of London, and has been diplomatic counselor to the secretary general of the Organization for Economic Cooperation and Development (OECD) since June 2021.

Having served in the State Department during the administration of President Bill Clinton, Rubin became a Sky News presenter with his own show called World News Tonight, which was eventually cancelled. In 2013, he moved from New York City to live permanently in London, England, with his wife, CNN chief international correspondent and anchor Christiane Amanpour, and their teenage son.

In 2022, Rubin was appointed special envoy and coordinator of the State Department's Global Engagement Center.

== Early life ==
Rubin was born on March 28, 1960, into a Jewish family in New York City, and raised in the village of Larchmont, in Westchester County, New York. He is the son of Harvey Rubin, a publisher and President of Pindar Press, and his wife, Judith (née Lowe), who trained students specializing in psychiatry. His sister Elizabeth Rubin is a journalist, Edward R. Murrow press fellow at the Council on Foreign Relations (CFR), and staff writer for The New York Times Magazine.

== Education ==
Rubin was educated at Phillips Exeter Academy and Mamaroneck High School, from which he graduated in 1977, followed by Columbia College at Columbia University, from which he graduated with a BA in political science in 1982, and a Master of International Affairs (MIA) in 1984 from Columbia's School of International and Public Affairs. At Columbia, Rubin was a student of Zalmay Khalilzad, later U.S. Ambassador to Afghanistan, Iraq and the United Nations under President George W. Bush. Rubin also attended Boston University in Massachusetts.

== Career ==
Early in his career, Rubin was the Assistant Director of Research at the Arms Control Association.

=== Clinton administration ===
Rubin served under President Clinton as assistant secretary of state for public affairs and chief spokesman for the State Department from 1997 to May 2000. In the Clinton administration, he was considered Secretary Madeleine Albright's right-hand man.

=== 2000–2006: academia and media ===
After leaving government, Rubin and his family relocated to London. He became a Visiting Professor of International Relations at the London School of Economics; a partner at communications consultancy Brunswick; and between 2002 and 2003, the host of PBS's Wide Angle series, a weekly international affairs program.

Returning to the United States, Rubin served as chief foreign policy spokesman for General Wesley Clark's presidential campaign from the launch of Clark's campaign in 2003 until Clark withdrew during the Democratic Party's 2004 Presidential Primaries, and then worked for Democratic nominee John Kerry during his 2004 Presidential Campaign, serving as a senior advisor for national security affairs.

Returning to London, from October 2005 to July 2006 Rubin became lead news anchor on World News Tonight on Sky News.

=== Support for Hillary Clinton 2008 candidacy ===
After returning to the United States in 2007 in the run-up to the 2008 presidential election, Rubin was a member of Hillary Clinton's campaign team for the 2008 Democratic nomination. He caused some controversy when he described Lord Trimble, the Nobel Peace Prize winner and former first minister of Northern Ireland, as a "crankpot" for stating that Hillary Clinton's claim to have been "helpful" in the Northern Ireland peace process was "a wee bit silly." Rubin also stated that Trimble's opinion was not important as he was "a Protestant," and so "traditionally conservative."

During the 2008 campaign, Rubin was a guest on CNN's Late Edition with Wolf Blitzer in a foreign policy discussion with Susan Rice, who later became Barack Obama's nominee for ambassador to the United Nations.

=== 2009–present ===
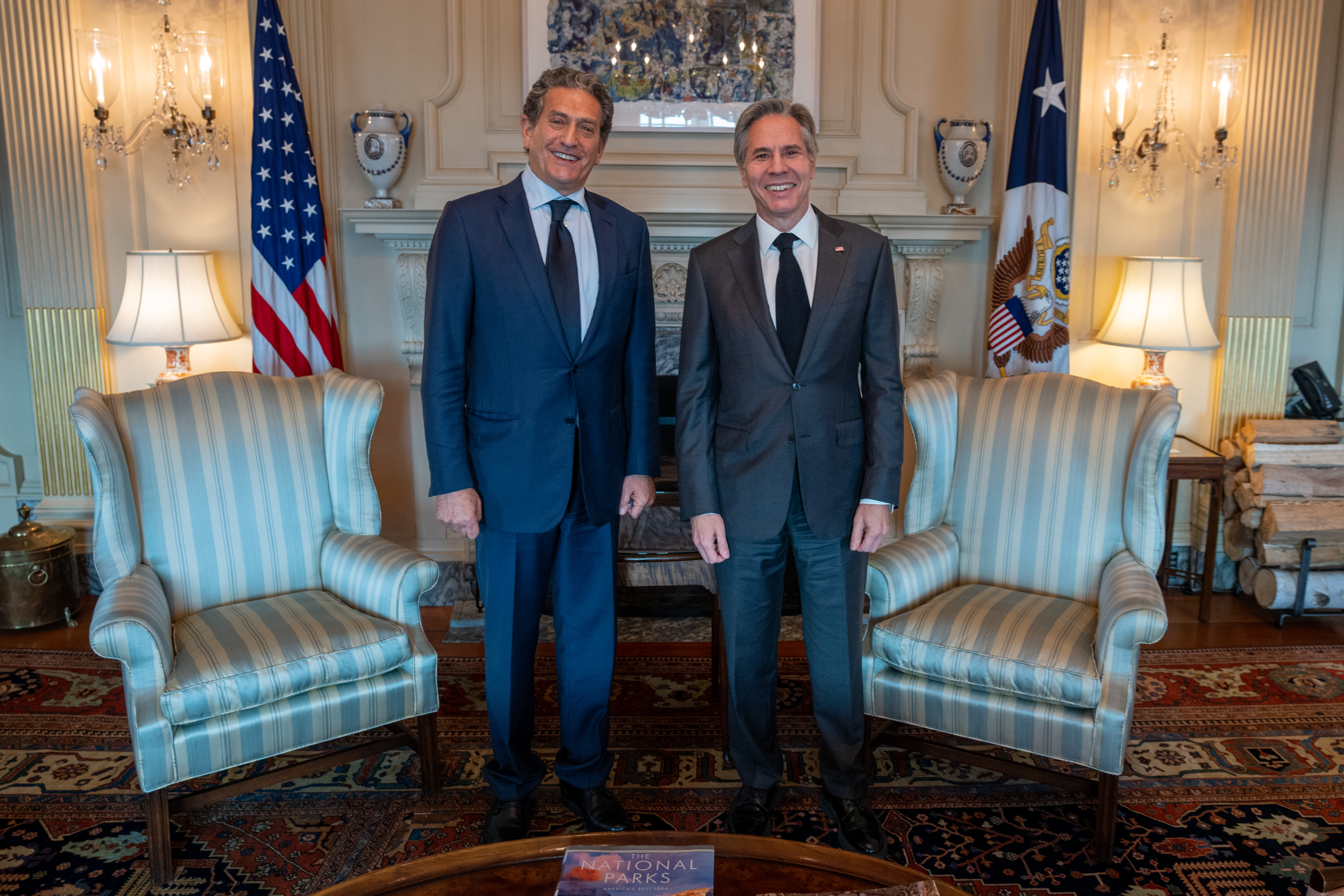
Rubin (left) with US Secretary of State Antony Blinken (right) in 2023

Rubin joined Bloomberg News in December 2010 and oversaw editorial issues in Central and South America, Mexico, Europe, the Middle East, Asia and Africa. He also led Bloomberg View, a Bloomberg op-ed project, with David Shipley. After only ten months, he quit the position and was appointed adjunct professor at Columbia University. Governor Andrew Cuomo appointed Rubin commissioner of the Port Authority of New York and New Jersey in 2011 as well as a counselor to the state's Empire State Development Corporation.

Rubin resigned all of his US-based positions on May 29, 2013, announcing that the family would return to London to work on several projects. Rubin was appointed scholar in residence at Oxford University's Rothermere American Institute. He also wrote a weekly foreign affairs column for The Sunday Times and co-chaired a high-level panel on Extending American Power for the Center for a New American Security in Washington.

Rubin was chair of international policy and strategy at Ballard Partners, based in Washington DC until June 2020. He was also a contributing editor at Politico, writing on U.S. foreign policy and world affairs.

Rubin relocated to Paris on June 1, 2021 to serve as diplomatic counselor to the newly elected secretary general of the Organization for Economic Cooperation and Development (OECD). At the OECD, his portfolio is focused on advising Secretary General Cormann on global affairs and diplomacy with key countries in Europe, Asia, Latin America and the Middle East.

Rubin was appointed as special envoy and coordinator of the Global Engagement Center on November 16, 2022 by Secretary of State Antony Blinken. His term ended on December 23, 2024.

== Personal life ==
In 1998, Rubin, who at the time was spokesman for the U.S. State Department, married Christiane Amanpour in a Catholic wedding at Bracciano, Italy. Having moved to London, England, they returned to New York City in 2010, where they rented an apartment in Manhattan's Upper West Side.

In 2013, he, his wife and son, moved back to London to live permanently. It was announced in July 2018 that Rubin and Amanpour were getting a divorce.

Government offices
Preceded by Thomas E. Donilon	Assistant Secretary of State for Public Affairs; 1997–2000	Succeeded by Richard Boucher
