= Securities Industry Association =

- Abbreviation: SIA
- Dissolved: 2006 (merged with the Bond Market Association to form the Securities Industry and Financial Markets Association)
- Type: Trade association
- Headquarters: New York City, New York, United States

The Securities Industry Association (SIA) was an association of firms and people who handle securities (in the financial sense) (stocks, bonds and their derivatives). In 2006, it merged with the Bond Market Association to form the Securities Industry and Financial Markets Association.

== Overview ==
The association published the annual Securities Industry Yearbook 1980-2006, and numerous other publications including for example the Securities Industry Fact Book (1993) and Who's Who in the Securities Industry (1972) and volumes such as:

- The New York Securities Industry : Its Economic Impact on New York State and City (July 1994);
- Tucker, J. Richard, State and Local Pension Funds, 1972; Digest of Authorized Investments and Actual investments (1972)
- Calvert, Gordon L., Fundamentals of Municipal Bonds (1973)

== Notable people ==
- Shana Madoff—served on the Executive Committee of the Compliance & Legal Division of the Securities Industry Association.
