= Bond Market Association =

International trade association for the bond market industry

Logo of the Bond Market Association

The Bond Market Association (TBMA, previously Public Securities Association or PSA until 1997) was the international trade association for the bond market industry, with its headquarters located in New York City and offices in London and Washington, D.C. Twenty per cent of the membership was located outside the United States, while 70 per cent was located outside New York City. TBMA acted as a global voice for bond issuers and traders, and coordinated with governments, corporations, and investors. It also had a code of ethics, which required members to behave in a fashion of fairness. On November 1, 2006, The Bond Market Association merged with the Securities Industry Association to form the Securities Industry and Financial Markets Association.

== Subprime mortgage role ==
TBMA marketed informational publications on the subject of CMOs. Early versions of its booklet "An Investor's Guide to Collateralized Mortgage Obligations (CMOs)" failed to include credit default among the risks to CMO investors.
