= Financial Services Forum =

American economy policy

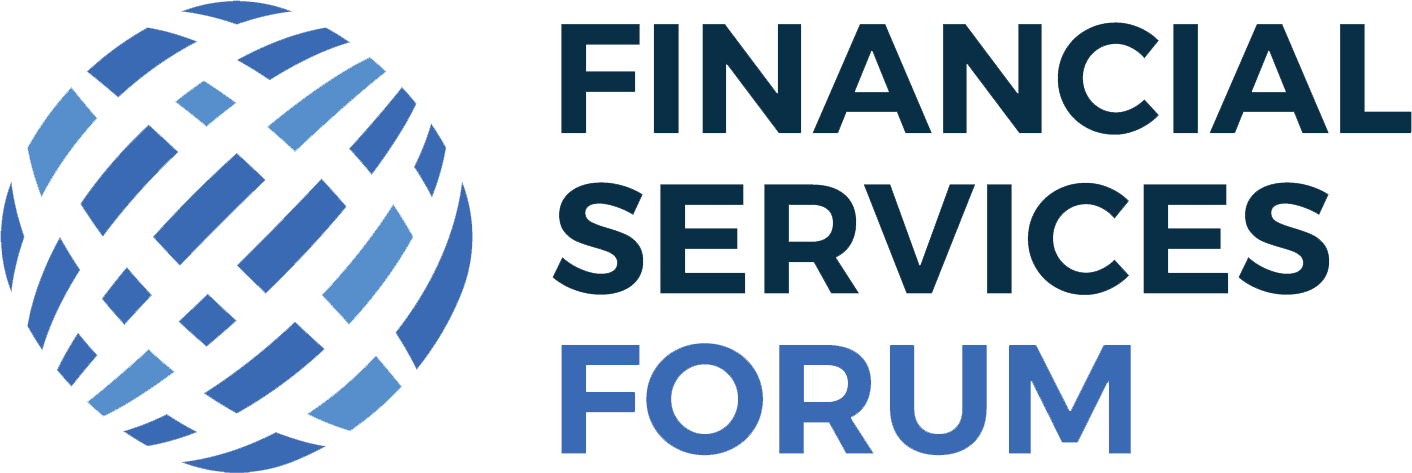
- Formation: 2000; 26 years ago
- Type: Industry association
- Legal status: Forum
- Purpose: Advocacy for 8 largest US financial organizations
- Location: Washington, DC, United States
- Region served: United States
- Services: Economic policy and advocacy organization
- Members: 8 (Bank of America, BNY Mellon, Citigroup, Goldman Sachs, JPMorgan Chase & Co., Morgan Stanley, State Street Corporation and Wells Fargo) (2024)
- Chair: Ronald P. O’Hanley
- Website: fsforum.com

The Financial Services Forum is an American, non-partisan economic policy and advocacy organization whose members are the chief executive officers of the eight largest and most diversified financial institutions headquartered in the United States.

== History ==
=== 2000 - Origins ===
The Financial Services Forum was established in 2000 by a core group of financial institution chief executive officers (CEO) following the enactment of the Gramm-Leach-Bliley Financial Modernization Act of 1999 (GLBA). The Forum's membership expanded and changed over time and in 2017, the Forum was reconstituted to represent solely the interests and views of the CEOs of the eight U.S.-based banks that had been designated as Global Systemically Important Financial Institutions.

Kevin Fromer, former Assistant Secretary at the U.S. Treasury Department, was appointed to serve as the Forum's president and CEO in 2017. In an interview with Politico in 2018, Fromer discussed the role of the Forum, “I think there's value in ensuring that individuals who are talking about the banks — whether they're large banks or community banks or regional banks — understand the value that those institutions provide.”

=== 2017 - New leadership ===
On September 20, 2017, the Forum announced the appointment of Kevin Fromer as its new president and Chief Executive Officer.

In January 2019, the Financial Services Forum announced that Morgan Stanley Chairman and CEO James Gorman would serve as the Chairman of its Board, a position previously held by Brian Moynihan, CEO of Bank of America. Citigroup CEO Michael Corbat assumed the Board's Vice Chairman role in 2019.

=== 2020 - Covid 19 ===
Forum members have actively worked to support customers, communities and the economy during the COVID-19 crisis. Through the Forum, the members announced in March 2020 that they were suspending share buybacks and were accessing the Federal Reserve's discount window. The Forum also joined other trade groups in advocating for support for U.S. businesses and consumers, such as supporting additional funds for the Paycheck Protection Program to support small businesses.

== Mission ==
The Financial Services Forum represents the interests and views of the eight largest and most diversified financial institutions headquartered in the United States. The Forum members are Bank of America, BNY Mellon, Citigroup, Goldman Sachs, JPMorgan Chase & Co., Morgan Stanley, State Street Corporation and Wells Fargo.

The Forum works to advance policies that promote savings and investment, deep and liquid capital markets, a competitive global marketplace, and a sound financial system. It also develops evidence-based information on the value of its members to the U.S. economy and communities.
