= Municipal Securities Rulemaking Board =

- Founded: June 4, 1975; 51 years ago in Washington, United States
- Founder: United States Congress
- Type: Self-regulatory governmental organization
- Location: Washington, DC, United States
- Products: Financial regulation of municipal bonds
- Fields: Financial services
- Website: www.msrb.org

The Municipal Securities Rulemaking Board (MSRB) is a United States self-regulatory financial organization that writes investor protection rules and other rules regulating broker-dealers and banks in the municipal securities market. This including tax-exempt and taxable municipal bonds, municipal notes, and other securities issued by states, cities, and counties or their agencies to help finance public projects or for other public policy purposes.

== History ==
The MSRB was created by the Section 15B of the Securities Exchange Act of 1934 (as amended by the Securities Acts Amendments of 1975, Pub. L. 94–29, and codified at 15 U.S.C. § 78o-4(b)) to create a mechanism for the regulation of municipal securities as well as brokers, dealers, and banks in the municipal securities business.

The Dodd–Frank Wall Street Reform and Consumer Protection Act of 2010 broadened the MSRB's rulemaking authority to also regulate so-called municipal advisors, which include financial advisors, swap advisors, brokers of guaranteed investment contracts and other market participants that advise on the issuance of municipal securities and provide certain other types of advice to state and local governments, public pension funds and other municipal entities on municipal derivatives, investment strategies and other financial matters. As of March 2013, since the SEC has not released the definition of "municipal advisor", the MSRB's rules in this regard are suspended and there is considerable concern in the industry as to whether underwriters and/or other regulated professionals may be viewed as municipal advisors, thereby having the related fiduciary duties. The MSRB's investor protection rules will be extended to protect municipal entities as well.

== Mandate ==
Like the Financial Industry Regulatory Authority (FINRA), the MSRB is a self-regulatory organization that is subject to oversight by the Securities and Exchange Commission (SEC). The MSRB is authorized to create rules designed "to prevent fraudulent and manipulative acts and practices, to promote just and equitable principles of trade, to foster cooperation and coordination with persons engaged in regulating, clearing, settling, and processing information with respect to, and facilitating transactions in municipal securities, to remove impediments to and perfect the mechanism of a free and open market in municipal securities, and, in general, to protect investors and the public interest". While the MSRB sets standards for broker-dealers, banks, and municipal advisors, MSRB rules do not apply to issuers of municipal securities or other municipal entities, which Congress generally exempted from most provisions of the federal securities laws (such as the Securities Act of 1933, the Securities Exchange Act of 1934 and the Investment Company Act of 1940) otherwise applicable to private-sector issuers of corporate and other types of securities. MSRB rules are enforced by various other federal regulatory organizations, including the SEC, FINRA, the Federal Reserve System, the Federal Deposit Insurance Corporation (FDIC) and the Office of the Comptroller of the Currency (OCC).

Among its investor protection rules, the MSRB is best known for adopting the first nationwide Pay to Play rule, known as Rule G-37, designed to eliminate the use of political contributions to obtain municipal underwriting business from state and local governments. The MSRB's investor protection rules also apply to state-operated 529 plans marketed by broker-dealers, as well as to the underwriting, sales and trading of Build America Bonds and other taxable municipal obligations. In addition, the MSRB operates the Electronic Municipal Market Access (EMMA) system, which provides free on-line access to comprehensive municipal securities disclosure documents, trade prices, interest rate information, and market statistics.

== Structure ==
The MSRB is composed of members from regulated broker-dealers and banks as well as from the public. Beginning on October 1, 2010, the MSRB will be recomposed to consist of a majority of independent public members and to include representatives of municipal advisors.

== See also ==
- Financial Industry Regulatory Authority (FINRA)
- Securities Investor Protection Corporation (SIPC)
- Securities market participants (United States)
