= Myron Scholes =

Canadian–American economist and Nobel Laureate (born 1941)

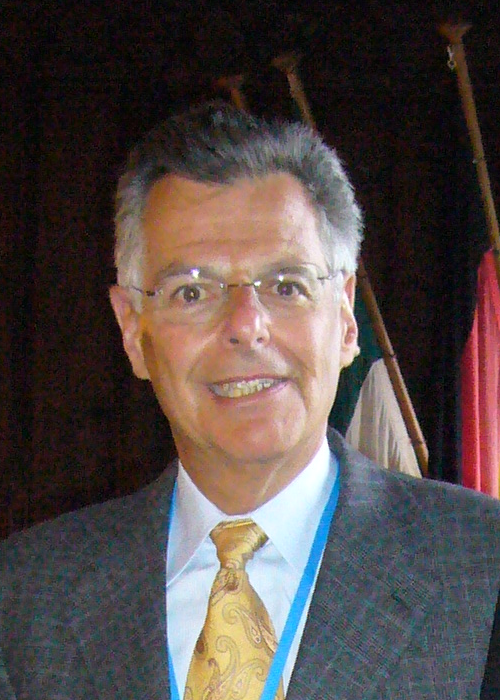
- Scholes in 2008
- Born: Myron Samuel Scholes; July 1, 1941 (age 85); Timmins, Ontario, Canada

Academic background
- Alma mater: McMaster University; University of Chicago
- Doctoral advisor: Eugene Fama; Merton Miller
- Influences: George Stigler, Milton Friedman

Academic work
- Discipline: Financial economics
- School or tradition: Chicago school of economics
- Notable ideas: Black–Scholes model
- Awards: Nobel Memorial Prize in Economics (1997)
- Website: Information at IDEAS / RePEc

Myron Samuel Scholes (/ʃoʊlz/ SHOHLZ; born July 1, 1941) is a Canadian–American financial economist. Scholes is the Frank E. Buck Professor of Finance, Emeritus, at the Stanford Graduate School of Business, Nobel Laureate in Economic Sciences, and co-originator of the Black–Scholes options pricing model. Scholes is currently the Chief Investment Strategist at Janus Henderson. Previously he served as the chairman of Platinum Grove Asset Management and on the Dimensional Fund Advisors board of directors, American Century Mutual Fund board of directors, chairman of the Board of Economic Advisers of Stamos Capital Partners, and the Cutwater Advisory Board. He was a principal and limited partner at Long-Term Capital Management (LTCM), a highly leveraged hedge fund that collapsed in 1998, and a managing director at Salomon Brothers. Other positions Scholes held include the Edward Eagle Brown Professor of Finance at the University of Chicago, senior research fellow at the Hoover Institution, director of the Center for Research in Security Prices, and professor of finance at MIT's Sloan School of Management. Scholes earned his PhD at the University of Chicago.

In 1997, Scholes – together with Robert C. Merton – was awarded the Nobel Memorial Prize in Economic Sciences for a method to determine the value of derivatives. The model provides a conceptual framework for valuing options, such as calls or puts, and is referred to as the Black–Scholes model.

== Biography ==
=== Early life and education ===
Scholes was born to a Jewish family on July 1, 1941, in Timmins, Ontario, where his family had moved during the Great Depression. In 1951 the family moved to Hamilton, Ontario. Scholes was a good student although fighting with his impaired vision starting with his teens until finally getting an operation when he was twenty-six. Through his family, he became interested in economics early, as he helped with his uncles' businesses and his parents helped him open an account for investing in the stock market while he was in high school.

After his mother died from cancer, Scholes remained in Hamilton for undergraduate studies and earned a Bachelor's degree in economics from McMaster University in 1962. One of his professors at McMaster introduced him to the works of George Stigler and Milton Friedman, two University of Chicago economists who would later both win Nobel prizes in economics. After receiving his B.A. he decided to enroll in graduate studies in economics at the University of Chicago. Here, Scholes was a colleague with Michael Jensen and Richard Roll, and he had the opportunity to study with Eugene Fama and Merton Miller, researchers who were developing the relatively new field of financial economics. He earned his MBA at the Booth School of Business in 1964 and his Ph.D. in 1969 with a dissertation written under the supervision of Eugene Fama and Merton Miller.

=== Academic career ===
In 1968, after finishing his dissertation, Scholes took an academic position at the MIT Sloan School of Management. Here he met Fischer Black, who was a consultant for Arthur D. Little at the time, and Robert C. Merton, who joined MIT in 1970. For the following years Scholes, Black and Merton undertook groundbreaking research in asset pricing, including the work on their famous option pricing model. At the same time, Scholes continued collaborating with Merton Miller and Michael Jensen. In 1973 he decided to move to the University of Chicago Booth School of Business, looking forward to work closely with Eugene Fama, Merton Miller and Fischer Black, who had taken his first academic position at Chicago in 1972 (although he moved two years later to MIT). While at Chicago, Scholes also started working closely with the Center for Research in Security Prices, helping to develop and analyze its famous database of high frequency stock market data.

In 1981 he moved to Stanford University, where he remained until he retired from teaching in 1996. Since then he holds the position of Frank E. Buck Professor of Finance Emeritus at Stanford. While at Stanford his research interest concentrated on the economics of investment banking and tax planning in corporate finance.

In 1997 he shared the Nobel Memorial Prize in Economics with Robert C. Merton "for a new method to determine the value of derivatives". Fischer Black, who co-authored with them the work that was awarded, had died in 1995 and thus was not eligible for the prize.

In 2012, he authored an article entitled 'Not All Growth Is Good' in The 4% Solution: Unleashing the Economic Growth America Needs, published by the George W. Bush Presidential Center.

=== Investment activity ===
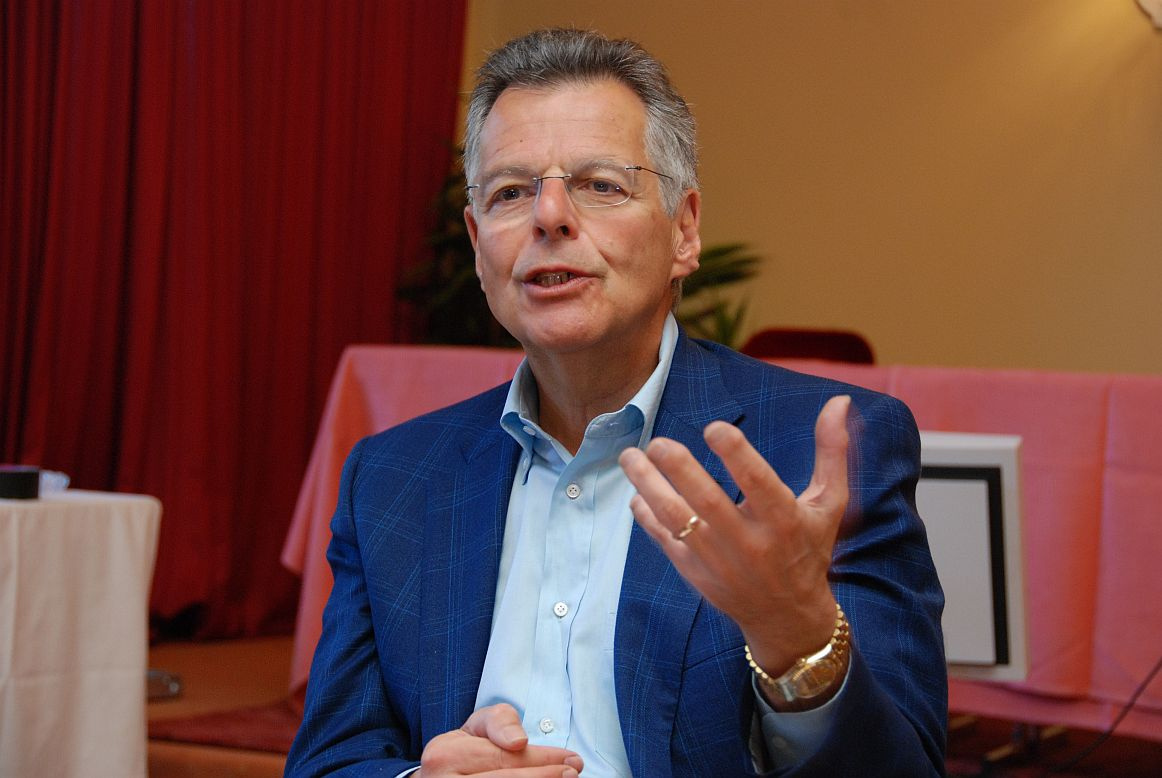
Scholes, 2009

In 1990 Scholes became more involved directly with the financial markets. He went to Salomon Brothers as a special consultant, then becoming a managing director and co-head of its fixed-income-derivative group. In 1994 Scholes joined several colleagues, including John Meriwether, the former vice-chairman and head of bond trading at Salomon Brothers, and his future Nobel Memorial Prize co-winner Robert C. Merton, and co-founded a hedge fund called Long-Term Capital Management (LTCM). The fund, which started operations with $1 billion of investor capital, performed extremely well in the first years, realizing annualized returns of over 40%. However, following the 1997 Asian financial crisis and the 1998 Russian financial crisis the highly leveraged fund in 1998 lost $4.6 billion in less than four months and collapsed abruptly, becoming one of the most prominent examples of risk potential in the investment industry.

LTCM brought legal problems for Scholes in 2005 in the case of Long-Term Capital Holdings v. United States. The firm's corporate structure and accounting had established an offshore tax shelter to avoid taxes on investment profits. Courts disallowed the firm's claim of $40 million in tax savings, finding it based on formal accounting losses of $106 million that represented no economic substance.

Subsequent to LTCM, in 1999 Scholes joined Oak Hill Capital, the private equity firm led by Robert Bass. There, Scholes and his LTCM colleague, Chi-Fu Huang, launched a new hedge fund, Oak Hill Platinum Partners.

Scholes is also chief investment strategist at Janus Henderson, a role he held at legacy firm Janus Capital Group since 2014. Janus Capital merged with Henderson Group in 2017 to form Janus Henderson. In this role, he leads the firm's evolving asset allocation product development efforts and partners with the investment team contributing macro insights and quantitative analysis specific to hedging, risk management and disciplined portfolio construction.

== See also ==
- List of economists
- List of quantitative analysts
- List of Jewish Nobel laureates

Awards
Preceded by James A. Mirrlees; William Vickrey	Laureate of the Nobel Memorial Prize in Economics; 1997; Served alongside: Robert C. Merton	Succeeded by Amartya Sen
