= Medical malpractice in the United States =

Professional medical negligence in the US

Medical malpractice is professional negligence by act or omission by a health care provider in which the treatment provided falls below the accepted standard of practice in the medical community and causes injury or death to the patient, with most cases involving medical error. Claims of medical malpractice, when pursued in US courts, are processed as civil torts. Sometimes an act of medical malpractice will also constitute a criminal act, as in the case of the death of Michael Jackson.

Medical professionals may obtain professional liability insurances to offset the costs of lawsuits based on medical malpractice. Further establishment of conditions of intention or malice may be applied where applicable.

== Frequency and cost of medical errors ==
Back in 1984, the extrapolated statistics from relatively few records in only several states of the United States estimated that between 44,000 and 98,000 people annually die in hospitals because of medical errors. Much work has been done since then, including work by the author of that study who moved on from those low estimates back in the 1990s. For example, the Centers for Disease Control and Prevention currently says that 75,000 patients die annually, in hospitals alone, from infections alone - just one cause of harm in just one kind of care setting. From all causes there have been numerous other studies, including "A New, Evidence-based Estimate of Patient Harms Associated with Hospital Care" by John T. James, PhD that estimates 400,000 unnecessary deaths annually in hospitals alone.

Another study notes that about 1.14 million patient-safety incidents occurred among the 37 million hospitalizations in the Medicare population over the years 2000–2002. Hospital costs associated with such medical errors were estimated at $324 million in October 2008 alone.

Approximately 17,000 malpractice cases are filed in the U.S. each year.

== The medical malpractice claim ==
=== The parties ===
The plaintiff is/was the patient, or a legally designated party acting on behalf of the patient, or – in the case of a wrongful death suit – the executor or administrator of a deceased patient's estate.

The defendant is the health care provider. Although a 'health care provider' usually refers to a physician, the term includes any medical care provider, including dentists, nurses, and therapists. As illustrated in Columbia Medical Center of Las Colinas v Bush, 122 S.W. 3d 835 (Tex. 2003), "following orders" may not protect nurses and other non-physicians from liability when committing negligent acts. Relying on vicarious liability or direct corporate negligence, claims may also be brought against hospitals, clinics, managed care organizations or medical corporations for the mistakes of their employees and contractors.

=== Common claims ===
In 2013, BMJ Open performed a study in which they found that "failure to diagnose" accounted for the largest portion of medical malpractice claims brought against health professionals. Furthermore, the study found that the most common result of this negligence was death of the patient. The other most common categories of malpractice include negligent treatment and failure to warn.

Thus, when a patient claims injury as the result of a medical professional's care, a malpractice case will most often be based upon one of three theories:

1. Failure to diagnose: a medical professional is alleged to have failed to diagnose an existing medical condition, or to have provided an incorrect diagnoses for the patient's medical condition.
2. Negligent treatment: a medical professional is alleged to have made a mistake that a reasonably competent professional in the same position would not have made.
3. Failure to warn: a medical professional is alleged to have treated the patient without first warning the patient of known risks and obtaining the patient's informed consent to that course of treatment.

=== Elements of the case ===
A plaintiff must establish all five elements of the tort of negligence for a successful medical malpractice claim.

1. A duty was owed: a legal duty exists whenever a hospital or health care provider undertakes care or treatment of a patient.
2. A duty was breached: the provider failed to conform to the relevant standard care.
3. The breach caused an injury: The breach of duty was a direct cause and the proximate cause of the injury.
4. Deviation from the accepted standard: It must be shown that the practitioner was acting in a manner which was contrary to the generally accepted standard in his/her profession.
5. Further establishment of conditions of intention or malice where applicable.
6. Damage: Without damage (losses which may be pecuniary or emotional), there is no basis for a claim, regardless of whether the medical provider was negligent. Likewise, damage can occur without negligence, for example, when someone dies from a fatal disease.

In cases involving suicide, physicians and particularly psychiatrists may be to a different standard than other defendants in a tort claim. In most tort cases, suicide is legally viewed as an act which terminates a chain of causality. Although the defendant may be held negligent for another's suicide, he or she is not responsible for damages which occur after the act. An exception is made for physicians who are found to have committed malpractice that results in a suicide, with damages assessed based on losses that are proved likely to accrue after the act of suicide.

=== The trial ===
Like all other tort cases, the plaintiff or their attorney files a lawsuit in a court with appropriate jurisdiction. However, unlike other tort cases, many states require that a plaintiff take specific steps before a medical malpractice lawsuit can be filed, such as providing the defendant with advance notice of intent to sue, obtaining and filing with the court a certificate of merit from a qualified medical expert who attests to the validity of the plaintiff's cause of action, submitting the claim to a panel of legal and medical experts for evaluation, or participating in mediation in an attempt to resolve the claim without litigation.

Between the filing of suit and the trial, the parties are required to share information through discovery. Such information includes interrogatories, requests for documents and deposition. If both parties agree, the case may be settled pre-trial on negotiated terms. If the parties cannot agree, the case will proceed to trial.

The plaintiff has the burden of proof to prove all the elements by a preponderance of evidence. At trial, both parties will usually present experts to testify as to the standard of care required, and other technical issues. The fact-finder (judge or jury) must then weigh all the evidence and determine which side is the most credible.

The fact-finder will render a verdict for the prevailing party. If the plaintiff prevails, the fact-finder will assess damages within the parameters of the judge's instructions. The verdict is then reduced to the judgment of the court. The losing party may move for a new trial. In a few jurisdictions, a plaintiff who is dissatisfied by a small judgment may move for additur. In most jurisdictions, a defendant who is dissatisfied with a large judgment may move for remittitur. Either side may take an appeal from the judgment.

=== Expert testimony ===
Expert witnesses must be qualified by the Court, based on the prospective experts qualifications and the standards set from legal precedent. To be qualified as an expert witness, a person must have a sufficient knowledge, education, training, or experience regarding the specific issue before the court to qualify the expert to give a reliable opinion on a relevant issue. The qualifications of the expert are not the deciding factors as to whether the individual will be qualified, although they are certainly important considerations. Expert testimony is not qualified "just because somebody with a diploma says it is so" (United States v. Ingham, 42 M.J. 218, 226 [A.C.M.R. 1995]). In addition to appropriate qualifications of the expert, the proposed testimony must meet certain criteria for reliability. In the United States, two models for evaluating the proposed testimony are used:

The more common (and some believe more reliable) approach used by all federal courts and most state courts is the 'gatekeeper' model, which is a test formulated from the US Supreme Court cases Daubert v. Merrell Dow Pharmaceuticals (509 U.S. 579 [1993]), General Electric Co. v. Joiner (522 U.S. 136 [1997]), and Kumho Tire Co. v. Carmichael (526 U.S. 137 [1999]). Before the trial, a Daubert hearing will take place before the judge (without the jury). The trial court judge must consider evidence presented to determine whether an expert's "testimony rests on a reliable foundation and is relevant to the task at hand." (Daubert, 509 U.S. at 597). The Daubert hearing considers 4 questions about the testimony the prospective expert proposes:

- Whether a "theory or technique . . . can be (and has been) tested"
- Whether it "has been subjected to peer review and publication".
- Whether, in respect to a particular technique, there is a high "known or potential rate of error"
- Whether there are "standards controlling the technique's operation".

Some state courts still use the Frye test that relies on scientific consensus to assess the admissibility of novel scientific evidence. Daubert expressly rejected the earlier federal rule's incorporation of the Frye test. (Daubert, 509 U.S. at 593–594) Expert testimony that would have passed the Frye test is now excluded under the more stringent requirements of Federal Rules of Evidence as construed by Daubert.

In view of Daubert and Kumho, the pre trial preparation of expert witnesses is critical. A problem with Daubert is that the presiding judge may admit testimony which derives from highly contested data. The judge may expand the limits contained in the "school of thought" precedent. Papers that are self-published may be admitted as the basis for expert testimony. Non-peer-reviewed journals may also be admitted in similar fashion. The only criterion is the opinion of a single judge who, in all likelihood, has no relevant scientific or medical training.

Many states also require that a certificate of merit before a malpractice lawsuit be filed which requires a report from a medical physician that the physician accused of negligence breached the standard of care and caused injury to the patient.

=== Damages ===
The plaintiff's damages may include compensatory and, in some states and under qualifying circumstances, punitive damages.

Compensatory damages are both economic and non-economic.

- Economic damages include financial losses such as lost wages (sometimes called lost earning capacity), medical expenses and life care expenses. These damages may be assessed for past and future losses.
- Non-economic damages are assessed for the injury itself: physical and psychological harm, such as loss of vision, loss of a limb or organ, the reduced enjoyment of life due to a disability or loss of a loved one, severe pain and emotional distress. Punitive damages are not available in all states and, when allowed, are usually only awarded in the event of wanton and reckless conduct.

== Statute of limitations ==
There is only a limited time during which a medical malpractice lawsuit can be filed. In the United States, these time limits are set by statute. In civil law systems, similar provisions are usually part of the civil code or criminal code and are often known collectively as "periods of prescription" or "prescriptive periods." The length of the time period and when that period begins vary per jurisdiction and type of malpractice. Therefore, each state has different time limits set. For example, in Pennsylvania, there is a two-year statute of limitation, but in other states the limitations period may be longer. Most states have special provisions for minors that may potentially extend the statute of limitations for a minor who has been injured as the result of medical malpractice.

== Nature of malpractice and compensation ==
A 2011 study in the New England Journal of Medicine reported that 75% of physicians in "low-risk" specialties and virtually 100% of physicians in "high-risk" specialties could expect to face a malpractice claim during their careers. However, the authors also noted that the vast majority of malpractice claims did not lead to any indemnity payments.

Most (73%) settled malpractice claims involve medical error. A 2006 study concluded that claims without evidence of error "are not uncommon, but most [72%] are denied compensation. The vast majority of expenditures [54%] go toward litigation over errors and payment of them. The overhead costs of malpractice litigation are exorbitant." Physicians examined the records of 1452 closed malpractice claims. Ninety-seven percent were associated with injury; of them, 73% got compensation. Three percent of the claims were not associated with injuries; of them, 16% got compensation. 63% were associated with errors; of them, 73% got compensation (average $521,560). Thirty-seven percent were not associated with errors; of them, 28% got compensation (average $313,205). Claims not associated with errors accounted for 13 to 16% percent of the total costs. For every dollar spent on compensation, 54 cents went to administrative expenses (including lawyers, experts, and courts). Claims involving errors accounted for 78 percent of administrative costs.

A 2004 study of medical malpractice claims in the United States examining primary care malpractice found that though incidence of negligence in hospitals produced a greater proportion of severe outcomes, the total number of errors and deaths due to errors were greater for outpatient settings. No single medical condition was associated with more than five percent of all negligence claims, and one-third of all claims were the result of misdiagnosis.

Male doctors have nearly two and half times increased odds of having medico-legal action taken against them than female doctors, a result consistent across many years and found internationally.

== Arguments about the medical liability system ==
Doctors' groups, patients, and insurance companies have criticized medical malpractice litigation as expensive, adversarial, unpredictable, and inefficient. They claim that the cost of medical malpractice litigation in the United States has steadily increased at almost 12 percent annually since 1975. More recent research from the same source has found that tort costs as a percentage of GDP dropped between 2001 and 2009, and are now at their lowest level since 1984. Jury Verdict Research, a database of plaintiff and defense verdicts, says awards in medical liability cases increased 43 percent in 1999, from $700,000 to $1,000,000. However, more recent research from the U.S. Department of Justice has found that median medical malpractice awards in states range from $109,000 to $195,000.

These critics assert that these rate increases are causing doctors to go out of business or move to states with more favorable tort systems. Not everyone agrees, though, that medical malpractice lawsuits are solely causing these rate increases. A 2003 report from the General Accounting Office found multiple reasons for these rate increases, with medical malpractice lawsuits being the primary driver. Despite noting multiple reasons for rate increases, the report goes on to state that the "GAO found that losses on medical malpractice claims-which make up the largest part of insurers' costs-appear to be the primary driver of rate increases in the long run." More recent data has indicated that medical malpractice rates are generally no longer rising. In 2011, data pooled from the industry by the publication Medical Liability Monitor indicated that medical malpractice insurance rates had declined for four straight years. The decrease was seen in both states that had enacted tort reform and in states that had not, leading actuaries familiar with the data to suggest that patient safety and risk management campaigns had had a more significant effect.

Major tort reform proposals include:

- special medical malpractice courts
- limits on noneconomic damages, and
- reduction of the statute of limitations for commencing a malpractice action.

The majority of the American public supports reforms to the malpractice system. However, surveys show that the majority of the American public also vastly underestimate the extent of medical errors. Recent research has shown that while both health consumers and health producers are concerned about some of the adverse consequences of healthcare litigation, health consumers perceive that increased healthcare litigation can reduce the incentives for negligence on the part of healthcare providers.

At the same time, studies of these claims have found that there is no problem of increasing malpractice verdicts and insurance costs driving doctors out of business.

=== Nontraditional Approaches to Liability Reform ===
The traditional approach to liability reform is to limit the amount of damages that can be recovered by a plaintiff (as noted above). Several new approaches to addressing medical malpractice have been investigated.

Communication and Resolution Programs: When a medical error is identified, the patient is approached by the physician and/or health care system and they mutually arrive at a settlement. Several laws have been passed to facilitate communication and resolution (Mandatory presuit notification laws, apology laws and State-facilitated dispute resolution laws).

Safe Harbors for Adherence to Practice Guidelines: This approach provides a defense for physicians if they follow pre approved clinical practice guidelines.

Judge-directed compensation: A group of judges with expertise in medical malpractice meet with each sides attorneys and negotiates a settlement between the parties.

Administrative Compensation:Sweden and New Zealand created health courts. Claims are sent to these courts that have the authority to settle a claim. Attorneys are not required and the claims are settled based the opinions of neutral experts. Compensation is awarded based on preset schedules and are based on the degree of injury.

=== Limits on recovery ===
Many jurisdictions placed non-economic damages caps that limit the amount that victims of medical malpractice can recover from negligent physicians, purportedly in an effort to decrease hospital and physician costs.

In California, for example, recovery for non-economic damages are limited to $350,000 for injury-related claims, rising by $40,000/year until reaching $750,000. For cases of wrongful death, however, the cap is $500,000 rising by $50,000/year until reaching $1 million. According to the Supreme Court of California, "noneconomic damages compensate the plaintiff for 'pain, suffering, inconvenience, physical impairment, disfigurement and other nonpecuniary damage [as per Cal.Civ.Code section 3333.2, subdivision (a)].' Section 1431.2, subdivision (b)(2) similarly defines noneconomic damages as 'subjective, non-monetary losses including, but not limited to, pain, suffering, inconvenience, mental suffering, emotional distress, loss of society and companionship, loss of consortium, injury to reputation and humiliation.'" Tort reform supporters argue that states have enacted such laws in order to keep health care costs low, in addition to helping curb medical malpractice litigation. However, according to the Supreme Court of California, the state's non-economic damages caps are "not a legislative attempt to estimate the true damages suffered by plaintiffs, but rather an attempt to control and reduce medical malpractice insurance costs by placing a predictable, uniform limit on the defendant's liability for noneconomic damages."

Texas law creates the most difficult "hurdles" in the United States for a plaintiff to succeed in recovering damages for any medical malpractice, even for such objective cases such as an emergency room exposure to the Ebola virus disease.

=== Texas law and effect ===
Texas passed a "tort reform" law taking effect on September 1, 2003. The act limited non-economic damages (e.g., damages for pain and suffering) in most malpractice cases to $250,000 across all healthcare providers and $250,000 for healthcare facilities, with a limit of two facilities per claim. As of 2013, Texas was one of 31 states to cap non-economic damages.

Following 2003, medical malpractice insurance rates were reduced in Texas. However, the Center for Justice & Democracy at New York Law School reports that rate reductions are likely attributable not to tort laws, but because of broader trends, such as "political pressure, the size of prior rate hikes, and the impact of the industry's economic cycle, causing rates to drop everywhere in the country." States which do not impose caps on malpractice damages, such as Connecticut, Pennsylvania, and Washington, have experienced reductions or stabilization in malpractice rates as well.

Various studies have shown that the Texas tort-reform law has had no effect on healthcare costs or the number of physicians practicing in the state. A February 2014 study found "no evidence to support" the claim that "there had been a dramatic increase in physicians moving to Texas due to the improved liability climate." The study found that this is true "for all patient care physicians in Texas, high-malpractice-risk specialties, primary care physicians, and rural physicians.

Plaintiffs' lawyers say that the Texas law prevents patients from getting compensation or damages even in cases where the patient clearly deserves it. In particular, the "willful and wanton" negligence standard for emergency care, which requires that the harm to the patient be intentional, makes it impossible to win a case where the harm is clearly negligent but not willful.

=== Financial impact ===
An August 2003 National Bureau of Economic Research paper by Katherine Baicker and Amitabh Chandra found that (1) "increases in malpractice payments made on behalf of physicians do not seem to be the driving force behind increases in premiums"; (2) "increases in malpractice costs (both premiums overall and the subcomponent factors) do not seem to affect the overall size of the physician workforce, although they may deter marginal entry, increase marginal exit, and reduce the rural physician workforce"; and (3) "there is little evidence of increased use of many treatments in response to malpractice liability at the state level, although there may be some increase in screening procedures such as mammography."

A 1996 study by Daniel P. Kessler and Mark McClellan analyzing data on elderly Medicare beneficiaries treated for two serious cardiac diseases in 1984, 1987, and 1990 determined that "malpractice reforms that directly reduce provider liability pressure lead to reductions of 5 to 9 percent in medical expenditures without substantial effects on mortality or medical complications."

A a 2004 Congressional Budget Office (CBO) report using data from a private actuarial firm and the Centers for Medicare and Medicaid Services (CMS) found that malpractice costs (excluding "defensive medicine") account for less than 2 percent of health care spending. A 2006 PriceWaterhouseCoopers report for America's Health Insurance Plans (a health-insurer trade association) used the 2 percent figure and an extrapolation from the Kessler and McClellan report to estimate that the combined cost of insurance and defensive medicine accounts for 10 percent of total health care costs in the U.S.

In 2009, the CBO "concluded that implementing a package of five malpractice reforms would reduce national health spending by about 0.5 percent."

A study by Michelle M. Mello and others published in the journal Health Affairs in 2010 estimated that the total annual cost of the medical liability system, including "defensive medicine," was about 2.4 percent of total U.S. health care spending. The authors noted that "this is less than some imaginative estimates put forward in the health reform debate, and it represents a small fraction of total health care spending," although it was not "trivial" in absolute terms.

A study by RAND Corp. researchers published in October 2014 in the New England Journal of Medicine concluded that laws restricting medical-malpractice suits do not reduce the amount of "defensive medicine" or reduce health-care costs. The researchers, led by Daniel A. Waxman, examined 3.8 million Medicare patient records from hospital emergency departments from 1997 to 2011, comparing care in three states that enacted strict malpractice reform laws about a decade earlier (Georgia, Texas and South Carolina) to care in neighboring states that did not enact such laws. The study found that the laws had no effect on whether doctors ordered resource-intensive care (e.g., CT or MRI scans and hospitalization).

== See also ==
- Medical law
- Medical error
- Never events
- Patient abuse
- Canterbury v. Spence
