= Dimick v. Schiedt =

- Supreme Court of the United States

Decided January 7, 1935
- Full case name: Dimick v. Schiedt
- Citations: 293 U.S. 474 (more)

Case history
- Prior: 70 F.2d 558

Holding
- Additur is a violation of the Seventh Amendment.

Court membership
- Chief Justice Charles E. Hughes Associate Justices Willis Van Devanter · James C. McReynolds; Louis Brandeis · George Sutherland; Pierce Butler · Harlan F. Stone; Owen Roberts · Benjamin N. Cardozo

Case opinions
- Majority: Sutherland
- Dissent: Stone

Laws applied
- U.S. Const. amend. VII

Dimick v. Schiedt, 293 U.S. 474 (1935), was a United States Supreme Court case in which the court held that the use of additur in the federal courts is a violation of the Seventh Amendment to the United States Constitution. Additur is the practice of a trial judge adding damages additional to the original amount awarded by the jury. The states are free to use additur in their courts as the Seventh Amendment has not been incorporated to the states.

== Background ==
Schiedt sued Dimick in the United States District Court for the District of Massachusetts to recover damages for a personal injury resulting from the alleged negligent operation of an automobile on a public highway in Massachusetts. The jury returned a verdict in favor of Schiedt for the sum of $500. Schiedt moved for a new trial on the grounds that the verdict was contrary to the weight of the evidence, that it was a compromise verdict, and that the damages allowed were inadequate.

The trial court ordered a new trial upon the last-named ground unless Dimick would consent to an increase of the damages to the sum of $1,500. Schiedt's consent was neither requested nor given. Dimick, however, consented to the increase, and, in accordance with the order of the court, a denial of the motion for new trial automatically followed. Schiedt appealed to the First Circuit Court of Appeals, where the judgment was reversed, the court holding that the conditional order violated the Seventh Amendment with respect of the right of trial by jury. That court recognized the doctrine, supported by Supreme Court precedent, that, in the case of an excessive verdict, it is within the power of the trial court to grant defendant's motion for a new trial unless plaintiff remit the amount deemed to be excessive, but held that the trial court was without power to condition the allowance of plaintiff's motion for a new trial upon the refusal of defendant to consent to an increase in the amount of damages.

== Opinion of the court ==
The Supreme Court issued an opinion on January 7, 1935.

== Subsequent developments ==
The prohibition of additur in Dimick has been criticized since it was issued, but it has never been overturned. State courts are free to recognize additur because the Seventh Amendment is not incorporated against the states.

The opposite of additur, remittitur, has been widely adopted throughout the American courts, both federal and state. Dicta in Dimick supported its use. Some legal scholars have questioned the constitutionality of the use of remittitur in the federal courts, as a violation of the plaintiff's Seventh Amendment right to a jury trial, but federal appellate courts have not examined that question.
