= Abuse of rights =

Exercise of a legal right to cause annoyance, harm or injury to another

In civil law jurisdictions, abuse of rights (also known as Prohibition of Chicane) is the exercise of a legal right only to cause annoyance, harm, or injury to another. The abuser is liable for the harm caused by their actions. Some examples of this are abuse of power, barratry, frivolous or vexatious litigation, a spite fence or house, forum shopping, abuse of process, malicious prosecution, tax avoidance (vs. anti-avoidance rules, step transaction doctrine, economic substance), etc. The principle is a creature of case law and was expanded from the neighborhood law doctrine of aemulatio vicini under the jus commune. This principle departs from the classical theory that "he who uses a right injures no one" (= neminem laedit qui suo iure utitur), instead embracing the maxim “a right ends where abuse begins” (= le droit cesse où l'abus commence).

== Foundation ==
The abuse of rights principle is laid out in German law by the so-called Schikaneverbot ‘ban on vexatiousness’ (BGB §226). It reads as follows:

Die Ausübung eines Rechts ist unzulässig,
wenn sie nur den Zweck haben kann, einem anderen Schaden zuzufügen.

Translation:

The exercise of a right is unlawful if its purpose
is only to cause harm to another.

Article 2 of the Einleitung to the Swiss Civil Code states:

Jedermann hat in der Ausübung seiner Rechte und in der Erfüllung seiner Pflichten nach Treu und Glauben zu handeln. Der offenbare Missbrauch eines Rechtes findet keinen Rechtsschutz.

Translation:

Everyone is expected to exercise their rights and fulfill their obligations according to the rules of good faith. The manifest abuse of a right is not protected by statute.

Articles 19, 20 and 21 of the Civil Code of the Philippines state that:

- Art. 19. “Every person must, in the exercise of his rights and in the performance of his duties, act with justice, give everyone his due and observe honesty and good faith.”
- Art. 20. “Every person who, contrary to law, wilfully or negligently causes damage to another, shall indemnify the latter for the same.”
- Art. 21. “Any person who wilfully causes loss or injury to another in manner that is contrary to morals, good customs or public policy shall compensate the latter for the damage.”

== Conditions ==
At least one of four conditions is required to invoke the doctrine:

- the predominant motive for exercising the right is to cause harm
- no serious or legitimate interest exists for judicial protection
- the exercise of the right is contra bonos mores or violates good faith or elementary fairness (equity)
- the right is exercised for a purpose other than its intended legal purpose.

The principle does not exist in common law jurisdictions.

In Scots law (which is mixed civil/common law jurisdiction), a much more limited doctrine known as aemulatio vicini serves the same purpose.

== See also ==
- Good faith
- Malice (law)
- Bullying
- Hate speech
- Evasion (law)
