= KPMG tax shelter fraud =

Tax evasion scandal

The KPMG tax shelter fraud scandal involved illegal U.S. tax shelters by KPMG that were exposed beginning in 2003. In early 2005, the United States member firm of KPMG International, KPMG LLP, was accused by the United States Department of Justice of fraud in marketing abusive tax shelters.

== Deferred prosecution agreement ==
Under a deferred prosecution agreement, KPMG LLP admitted criminal wrongdoing in creating fraudulent tax shelters to help wealthy clients dodge $2.5 billion in taxes and agreed to pay $456 million in penalties. KPMG LLP will not face criminal prosecution as long as it complies with the terms of its agreement with the government. On January 3, 2007, the criminal conspiracy charges against KPMG were dropped. However, Federal Attorney Michael J. Garcia stated that the charges could be reinstated if KPMG does not continue to submit to continued monitorship through September 2008.

On 29 August 2005, nine individuals, including six former KPMG partners and the former deputy chairman of the firm, were criminally indicted in relation to the multibillion-dollar criminal tax fraud conspiracy. The nine individuals named in the indictment were:

- Jeffrey Stein, former Deputy Chairman of KPMG, former Vice Chairman of Tax Services, and former KPMG tax partner, a lawyer with a Master's in tax law.
- John Lanning, former Vice Chairman of Tax Services, and former KPMG tax partner, a CPA (Certified Public Accountant).
- Richard Smith, former Vice Chairman of KPMG in charge of Tax, a former leader of KPMG's Washington National Tax, and former KPMG tax partner, a lawyer.
- Philip Wiesner, former Partner-In-Charge of KPMG's Washington National Tax and former KPMG tax partner, a lawyer with a Master's in tax law and a CPA.
- John Larson, a lawyer, CPA and former KPMG Senior Tax Manager who left KPMG to form a series of entities with defendant Robert Pfaff, which entities participated in certain tax shelter transactions as the purported investment advisor.
- Robert Pfaff, a lawyer, CPA and former KPMG tax partner, who left KPMG to form a series of entities with defendant John Larson.
- Raymond J. Ruble, also known as R.J. Ruble, a lawyer and former tax partner in the New York, New York, office of Sidley Austin, a prominent national law firm.
- Mark Watson, former Partner-in-Charge of the Personal Financial Planning division in KPMG'S Washington National Tax, and former KPMG tax partner, a CPA.

On 17 October 2005, another ten individuals were indicted on criminal conspiracy and tax evasion charges:

The four tax shelters at issue were known as BLIPS, or bond linked issue premium structure; Flips, or foreign leveraged investment program; OPIS, or offshore portfolio investment strategy and a variant of Flips; and SOS, or short option strategies.

== Chronology ==
In August 2005, former official of the German bank Bayerische Hypo-Und Vereinsbank AG (HVB) Domenick DeGiorgio, who worked with KPMG to sell the shelters, pleaded guilty to tax evasion and fraud charges. On 15 February 2006, HVB admitted to criminal wrongdoing for its participation in the KPMG tax shelter fraud. The prosecution against the company was deferred by agreement with the U.S. Attorney. Under its deferred prosecution agreement, the company will pay $29.6 million in fines, restitution and penalties.

On 10 March 2006, U.S. District Judge Lewis A. Kaplan released former KPMG accounting executive David Greenberg on $25 million bail. Kaplan's ruling reversed his previous denial of bail to Greenberg. Judge Kaplan ordered Greenberg to live in Manhattan under electronic monitoring until his trial for tax fraud begins, and warned his family that they would be financially ruined if Greenberg attempted to flee the country. Kaplan also said that Greenberg's finances were in such disarray that it was impossible to figure out where his assets were and how much he was worth. Called a flight risk by federal prosecutors, Greenberg was the only defendant to be arrested by authorities when the indictments were handed down in October 2005.

On 28 March 2006, David Rivkin pleaded guilty to charges of conspiracy and tax evasion in U.S. District Court in Manhattan. "I knew that the losses should not have been claimed on the tax forms", Rivkin told Judge Kaplan. Rivkin admitted that he conspired with others between January 1999 and May 2004 to prepare and execute false documents so that clients could file false tax returns. He also admitted that he took steps to conceal the existence of fraudulent tax shelters from the Internal Revenue Service (IRS) and avoided registering the shelters with the IRS by claiming attorney-client privileges. Rivkin signed an agreement to cooperate with prosecutors, who could then ask the judge to consider giving Rivkin a more lenient sentence rather than the years he might face in prison. Sentencing was set for February 9, 2007.

On 27 June 2006, Judge Kaplan ruled that by threatening KPMG with indictment unless the firm reneged on its policy of paying the defense costs of partners who were indicted for work performed in the course of the firm's tax shelter business, the Department of Justice violated the constitutional rights of employees. In his opinion, Judge Kaplan agreed with the defendants' contention that KPMG was improperly pressured not to pay their legal expenses, "because the government held the proverbial gun to its head."

In the meantime, related rulings were handed down in a civil case that had been brought against the Internal Revenue Service in late 2004 by two Texas lawyers, Harold W. Nix, and C. Cary Patterson. Nix and Patterson sued the IRS for refunds after the tax agency denied each of their claims for nearly $67 million in deductions stemming from their use of the BLIPS tax shelter in 2000. Their lawsuit was thought to be relevant to the KPMG tax shelter fraud case because BLIPS is one of the tax shelters alleged to be abusive by the prosecution in that matter. On 20 July 2006, Judge T. John Ward of the United States District Court for the Eastern District of Texas ruled that the use of BLIPS by Nix and Patterson was essentially legitimate, because the IRS's application of tougher Treasury Department rules in 2003 to liabilities that occurred in BLIPS was "ineffective" and "not enforceable" because it was retroactive. The Internal Revenue Code generally prohibits retroactive regulations. In response to this ruling, prosecutors in the KPMG case have indicated that they will argue that the BLIPS shelter itself was technically valid, but that the way the defendants carried it out was fraudulent. In turn, lawyers for the defendants argue that no court of law has ever ruled that the tax shelters in question were illegal. And in February 2007, Judge Ward essentially reversed himself and ruled the tax shelter consisted of fake bank loans and therefore illegitimate, despite his previous ruling identified in the link above.

On 8 February 2007, Deutsche Bank reached a settlement with hundreds of investors to whom it sold aggressive U.S. tax shelters similar to those attacked by the prosecution in the KPMG tax fraud case. This settlement came a year after US DOJ prosecutors in Manhattan announced their investigation of Deutsche Bank's role in questionable tax shelters.

On 23 May 2007, the Second Circuit dismissed a complaint against accounting firm KPMG to recover fees and expenses arising from criminal tax fraud charges involving former KPMG partners and employees. The court held that the district court, which presides over the criminal case, erred in extending "ancillary" jurisdiction to the civil dispute between the defendants and non-party KPMG. Treating KPMG's appeal as a petition for writ of mandamus, the court issued the writ, vacated the district court's orders, and dismissed the civil complaint.

On 17 July 2007, Judge Kaplan dismissed charges against 13 former KPMG employees, ruling that he had no alternative because the government had strong-armed KPMG into not paying the legal fees of defendants and had violated their rights. "This indictment charges serious crimes. They should have been decided on the merits as to every defendant," Kaplan wrote. "But there are limits on the permissible actions of even the best prosecutors." Barring KPMG from paying its former employees' legal bills "foreclosed these defendants from presenting the defenses they wished to present, and, in some cases, even deprived them of the counsel of their choice. This is intolerable in a society that holds itself out to the world as a paragon of justice," Kaplan wrote in his ruling. Kaplan's decision did not affect the prosecution of R.J. Ruble, a former law partner at Sidley Austin LLP, and three former KPMG partners, including David Greenberg, who worked in the firm's Orange County office and released KPMG from any obligation to him when he left its employ. John Larson and Robert Pfaff, the other two former partners still facing charges, left KPMG eight years before the criminal action was filed and did not initially seek to have the accounting firm pay their legal bills.

On 20 August 2007, the prosecutors announced that one of the aiders and abettors of tax fraud, David Amir Makov, agreed to plead guilty and cooperate with prosecution of his former colleagues. In the preceding week, the federal court in Manhattan received $150,000 from Mr. Makov as part of a bail modification agreement that allows him to travel to Israel. Because Makov never worked for KPMG, he was unaffected by Judge Kaplan's dismissal of charges against 13 of his codefendants.

On 10 September 2007, Makov entered a guilty plea to one information count of conspiracy. He agreed to pay a $10 million penalty and provided new details on those involved. Makov gave a brief explanation on the workings of BLIPS, or Bond Linked Issue Premium Structure, which he said he helped create. In previous hearings, Judge Kaplan had chastised prosecutors for failing to explain clearly how BLIPS worked. According to Makov's testimony, the BLIPS shelters were created to generate artificial losses that were then used by wealthy investors to offset gains in legitimate income. The shelter involved a purported investment component as well as banks, extending purported loans to investors. According to prosecutors, BLIPS were marketed and sold around 1999 and 2000 to at least 186 wealthy investors and generated at least $5.1 billion in phony tax losses. The Presidio entities that Makov formed, owned and operated with co-defendants Robert Pfaff and John Larson, both former KPMG employees, made at least $134 million selling BLIPS. The IRS regards a tax shelter as abusive if it has no legitimate business purpose or genuine economic substance, in contrast to real loans, with money at risk, or real investments. According to Makov, although BLIPS were created on paper to look like seven-year investments, they involved neither real loans nor real investment components. "There was no economic substance," Makov testified. "Instead, we created the appearance of economic substance, rather than the reality." Makov claimed that although he initially thought that BLIPS were legitimate, "as part of the deception" he was eventually "asked by representatives of Bank A," among others, "to come up with an investment rationale." He added that he was "clearly told by Bank A, KPMG" and others "that the loan was not at risk." According to The New York Times, people close to the case have identified "Bank A" as Deutsche Bank AG. The bank has not been charged but is expected to reach a settlement with the government. A graduate of the Harvard Business School and a one-time employee of Long-Term Capital Management, prior to founding Presidio around 1999, Makov worked at Deutsche Morgan Grenfell, an investment banking arm of Deutsche Bank AG. Makov was originally charged with dozens of counts of fraud, tax evasion, and conspiracy, with each count carrying five years in jail. Prosecutors are expected to drop all of the other charges if he cooperates throughout the trial.

Jury selection for the KPMG tax shelter fraud trial began on 9 October 2007. However, on 18 October 2007, Judge Kaplan postponed indefinitely the trial set to begin in five days, discharging jurors he had already selected to hear the case, and removing Steven Bauer of Latham & Watkins, a lawyer for former KPMG executive John Larson. The government had previously asked the judge to decide whether Bauer should be removed because he worked as a lawyer for Makov and may have a conflict of interest. Larson had declined to waive his right to have an attorney free of conflicting interests. Kaplan ruled to disqualify Bauer as trial counsel for Larson and pledged to address the issue of whether Latham & Watkins should also be disqualified if Larson seeks to be represented by another lawyer at that firm.

On 28 August 2008, the U.S. Court of Appeals for the Second Circuit upheld the dismissal of criminal charges against 13 former executives at KPMG. The Court held that the government prosecutors "unjustifiably interfered with defendants' relationship with counsel and their ability to mount a defense, in violation of the Sixth Amendment...." by pressuring KPMG to refrain from paying their legal fees. Separately on the same day, Deputy U.S. Attorney General Mark Filip announced new prosecution rules aimed at not penalizing companies as noncooperative for protecting attorney-client material or paying for their employees' attorneys in probes. "No corporation is obligated to cooperate or to seek cooperation credit by disclosing information to the government," Filip said at a press conference at the New York Stock Exchange. "Refusal by a corporation to cooperate, just like refusal by an individual to cooperate, is not evidence of guilt."

On 15 October 2008, opening arguments began in the trial of David Greenberg and Robert Pfaff, former KPMG tax partners; John Larson, former KPMG senior tax manager; and Raymond Ruble, a former partner at law firm Sidley Austin. The four defendants are charged with conspiring to evade taxes for more than 600 clients in a case that was touted as the largest criminal tax prosecution when it started in 2005 with 19 defendants but is being tried on a much smaller scale. Assistant U.S. attorney John Hillebrecht told the jury in Manhattan federal court that the four men lied and cheated "by making the tax bills of some of our nation's richest citizens disappear." In turn, Larson's defense lawyer, Thomas Hagemann, stated that his client believed in good faith that what he did was allowed under the law, openly conducted his dealings, and acted with "good faith disclosure". Hagemann called David Makov, a former colleague of Larson, turned one of the government's main witnesses, "a liar and perjurer". The trial is expected to last three to four months.

On 24 November 2008, two of the remaining four defendants, former KPMG tax partner Robert Pfaff and former senior tax manager John Larson, filed a motion to dismiss the charges against them or declare a mistrial. The motion said that during the trial prosecutors elicited testimony from a witness accusing Pfaff and Larson of concealing information from KPMG and its tax department to obtain KPMG approval for BLIPS, thus transforming a tax fraud conspiracy with KPMG against the IRS into an honest services fraud conspiracy against KPMG. The motion said the defense had received no notice of such a change in the prosecution's theory and could not prepare a defense and so sought to have the judge to dismiss the indictment or grant a mistrial. The motion claimed that the government's alleged deceitful procurement of KPMG's confidential tax returns through a parallel civil tax fraud investigation by the DOJ was a violation of due process. The defendants relied on three cases where district courts dismissed indictments or suppressed evidence "where the Government has brought a civil action solely to obtain evidence for its criminal prosecution or has failed to advise the defendant in its civil proceeding that it contemplates his criminal prosecution". (Note: Two of these cases were later reversed on appeal.) The prosecution responded that the government has always alleged, and still contends, that KPMG as an entity was a conspirator, not a victim of any kind of fraud. "That for a period of time there was an effort to keep certain facts from certain individual KPMG employees is of no moment whatever," the government said. Judge Kaplan rejected the motion, finding that neither of the circumstances invoked by the defendants applied to their case: "Defendants do not deny that there was a bona fide civil investigation, they complain merely that there was a criminal investigation as well. And defendants, who were not the targets of the civil investigation, do not claim to have been deceived by the government." In a footnote, the court notes that the defendants relied in part on the fact that four of the now-dismissed defendants had given deposition testimony while unaware of the criminal investigation. Judge Kaplan added that they "do not suggest that the government deceived these individuals," suggesting perhaps that if the government had engaged in some deceptive conduct, the defendants' motion might have had more traction.

1 December 2008 marked the expiration of the deadline for the federal prosecutors to seek certiorari by asking the United States Supreme Court to reconsider the 28 August 2008 2nd Circuit appeals court's decision that upheld the 17 July 2007 ruling by Judge Kaplan in the Southern District Court of New York, dismissing criminal charges against 13 of the 19 original defendants.

From 8 to 10 December 2008, the jury heard closing arguments in the KPMG tax shelter case. Raymond Ruble's lawyer Jack S. Hoffinger told jurors that it was impossible to conclude that the defendants purposefully tried to break the law in helping at least 600 wealthy people trim their taxes since they did not try to hide what they were doing from the Internal Revenue Service or others. "What do we have, a massive suicide pact?" he asked. He said that the defendants would not have designed something criminal and then "put it out there so that the IRS will see it, the government will see it and we will end up in court charged with a crime." Assistant U.S. Attorney Margaret Garnett retorted that the defendants created tax shelters that were actually shams meant to appear to be legitimate investments: "These defendants sold these so-called investments for years and years and not a single one of these defendants' clients ever made a dime of profit." She said that the only purpose of the fraudulent tax shelters marketed from 1997 until 2000 was to "generate artificial tax losses to evade millions and millions of taxes". She speculated that the defendants may have had a false sense of safety from the law, and claimed that "their greed and ambition overcame their sense of right and wrong."

On 18 December 2008, lawyer Raymond Ruble, who once was a partner at Brown & Wood, was convicted on 10 counts of tax evasion while investment consultants Robert Pfaff and John Larson were convicted on 12 counts. They were acquitted of conspiracy. David Greenberg, deemed by the prosecution an "ongoing danger to the community" and a flight risk, was acquitted of all charges. Greenberg was jailed for five months and required to wear electronic monitoring for two and a half years afterward. His acquittal came as a result of Steve Acosta, a key government witness, being "utterly incapable of giving a straight answer on cross-examination", as conceded by Assistant U.S. Attorney John Hillebrecht in closing arguments. Acosta had pleaded guilty to conspiracy and tax evasion in a cooperation deal aimed at leniency at sentencing. He was released from federal prison on November 22, 2010. Judge Kaplan ordered that electronic monitoring begin for Pfaff at his Golden, Colo., home and for Larson at his New York City home, though the judge said he would reassess the need at a bail hearing next month, especially after what happened with Greenberg. Six people, including former KPMG tax partner David Rivkin; David Amir Makov, a one-time currency and fixed-income derivatives trader at Presidio; and Domenick DeGiorgio, a former managing director at German bank HVB, or Bayerische Hypo & Vereinsbank, have pleaded guilty to criminal charges in the matter.

Some of KPMG's tax shelter clients are now suing KPMG for liability exposure.

In 2004, a PBS Frontline documentary episode scrutinized the use of tax shelters by corporations and wealthy individuals, as well as the role of accounting firms in facilitating these arrangements. The episode, which focused on the consequences for ordinary taxpayers, highlighted KPMG's involvement in tax shelter fraud. Journalist Hedrick Smith investigated the firm's practices, uncovering how their conduct contributed to the wider issue.
