= Frank Buck =

Frank Buck may refer to:

- Frank Buck (Tennessee politician) (1943–2024), state legislator in Tennessee
- Frank Buck (animal collector) (1884–1950), American wildlife importer and media personality
- Frank E. Buck (1884–1970), Canadian horticulturalist
- Frank H. Buck (1887–1942), U.S. representative from California 1933–1942
