= Non-economic damages caps =

Limitations in lawsuits

In United States legal practice, non-economic damages caps are tort reforms which limit (i.e., "cap") damages in lawsuits for subjective, non-pecuniary harms such as wrongful death, paraplegia, disfigurement, injuries that prevent the injured from being able to independently care for themselves, loss in the ability to procreate, pain and suffering, inconvenience, emotional distress, loss of society and companionship, loss of consortium, and loss of enjoyment of life. This is opposed to economic damages, which encompasses pecuniary harms such as medical bills, lost wages, and costs of repair or replacement. Non-economic damages should not be confused with punitive or exemplary damages, which are awarded purely to penalise defendants and do not aim to compensate either pecuniary or non-pecuniary losses.

Non-economic damages caps are intended to reduce the ability of courts and, in jurisdictions which continue to maintain juries in civil cases, juries to award excessive or otherwise large damages for subjective harm that cannot easily be objectively assessed. The rationale underlying such caps is to curtail the impact of excessive damages on defendants, particularly in the context of lawsuits against private individuals or companies for negligence causing personal injury or property damage and against medical professionals for malpractice claims brought by patients. With regard to the former, proponents of tort reform argue that large and subjective awards of damages against individuals who did not necessarily intend to cause harm is fundamentally unjust as it can severely impact the defendant's financial independence while large and unpredictable awards against businesses can increase the legal cost of doing business thus leading to unsustainably higher prices for consumers and decreasing overall economic activity to the detriment of society at large. With regard to the latter, proponents of tort reform argue that large, unpredictable damages causes an increase in the cost of medical malpractice insurance for healthcare professionals and encourages the practice of defensive medicine whereby medical practitioners agree to unnecessary treatment in order to decrease the likelihood of future malpractice claims. Opponents of tort reform regard non-economic damages caps in both instances as unfair to plaintiffs, particularly in cases involving personal injuries whose financial cost to victims may greatly exceed acceptable economic damages. Additionally, opponents argue that limits on damages in cases of medical malpractice may create moral hazard as healthcare professionals face reduced liability. Consequently, the implementation of non-economic damages caps and decisions as to the extent to which different areas of tort law are subject to caps is more contentious than caps on purely punitive damages.

== Medical malpractice caps ==
Many jurisdictions have enacted legislation imposing caps on non-economic damages in medical malpractice suits. In America, former President George W. Bush proposed a nationwide $250,000 cap in medical malpractice cases.

=== Impact on healthcare costs ===
In a study published in 2005 in the Journal of the American Medical Association, 93% of physicians surveyed reported practising defensive medicine, or "[altering] clinical behaviour because of the threat of malpractice liability". Of physicians surveyed, 43% reported using digital imaging technology in clinically unnecessary circumstances, which includes costly MRIs and CAT scans. Forty-two percent of respondents reported that they had taken steps to restrict their practice in the previous 3 years, including eliminating procedures prone to complications, such as trauma surgery, and avoiding patients who had complex medical problems or were perceived as litigious. Proponents of tort reform thus endorse caps on non-economic damages in medical malpractice claims as a way to reduce the extent to which physicians practice defensive medicine, the provision of unnecessary medical care in order to avoid potential liability, and would increase access to health care. Nevertheless, a study by the U.S. Congressional Budget Office published in 2004 found that "Malpractice costs account for less than 2 percent of health care spending."

=== Impact on malpractice insurance premiums ===
Although proponents of damages caps in medical malpractice cases argue that the caps reduce malpractice insurance premiums for doctors, despite a considerable amount of research on the subject the data in support of that argument is not compelling. Within the United States, the impact of damages caps on the number of malpractice claims paid out by insurance companies varies by state and, in many states, reviews of malpractice premiums following the implementation of damages caps showed that the caps had no effect on premiums.

== Personal injury caps ==
In a personal injury lawsuit in common law jurisdictions, the two basic forms of compensatory damages that may be awarded are economic damages, compensation for the injured person's past and future financial costs and losses, and non-economic damages, compensation for the pain and suffering which results from an injury. As many jurisdictions lack adequate approaches to assessing the worth of unpaid labour or harm to minors and retirees who do not work, non-economic damages are often used as a practical way to ensure that such individuals receive compensation comparable to that received by working adults.

Nevertheless, it is difficult for courts to assign a dollar value to these losses, which are thus arbitrary in nature. Because of the emotionally charged environment of personal injury trials, some awards will inevitably be unreasonable. For example, in Ernst v. Merck, a Texas Vioxx products liability case, the jury issued a verdict of $24 million in compensatory damages, which includes non-economic damages, for a widow of a 59-year-old triathlete who died from arrhythmia, or an irregular heartbeat, that could have been prevented had Merck provided warnings about the drug. Tort reform supporters argue that the widow had not been married a long time, and suggest that the damage award was excessive. This illustrates the extent to which the factors for which non-economic damages are awarded cannot objectively be assigned a monetary value.

Opponents of tort reform contend that courts should assess damages on a case-by-case basis, that non-economic damages caps risk creating moral hazard, and that non-economic damages caps themselves may be arbitrary or produce unjust results if applied rigidly and without exception.

== Alternatives ==
In New Zealand, personal injury and medical malpractice have been eliminated from the tort system entirely and replaced by a system of no-fault insurance. The Accident Compensation Corporation is responsible for providing compensation for injuries in New Zealand. Due to the scheme's no-fault basis, people who have suffered personal injury may only sue an at-fault party for exemplary damages.

== Non-economic damages caps in American states ==
Overall, non-economic damages throughout the United States cover pain, suffering, and other nonpecuniary injuries, and in medical malpractice cases many states have imposed caps that range from $250,000 to $750,000 or more. Damage caps have various purposes; for instance, they can discourage malicious lawsuits and prevent the costs of transacting business from being overly inflated, but have also been criticized as unjust. Many American jurisdictions with non-economic damage caps have defined non-economic damages by statute.

While opponents of caps on damages in America argue that limiting total damages that jurors may award violate the right to a trial by jury, tort law is a question of state law and only state constitutions can mandate or define the scope of a right to trial by jury in civil matters. Outside the United States and a minority of other common law jurisdictions, civil juries do not exist in the majority of common law jurisdictions and virtually all civil law jurisdictions, where the notion of trial by jury is generally regarded as antiquated and seen as introducing societal biases into the legal system. Consequently, the use of preserving a right to civil juries as a rationale for opposing non-economic damages caps is limited to American discourse on the matter.

Roughly half of U.S. states have imposed damages caps in medical malpractice litigation. Eleven states impose damages caps for all general tort and personal injury cases.

=== California ===
In California, non-economic damages awarded in medical malpractice actions are capped at $250,000. Non-economic damages are meant "to compensate for pain, suffering, inconvenience, physical impairment, disfigurement and other nonpecuniary damage."

=== Illinois ===
The Illinois Supreme Court found in the 1997 case Best v. Taylor Machine Works found that a $500,000 cap on noneconomic damages was (in addition to serving as a "legislative remittitur") special legislation that made an arbitrary distinction between those who sustained major noneconomic damages in a single tort versus multiple tortious actions and between those that suffered minor amounts of noneconomic damages versus amounts about the $500,000 cap (such as a plaintiff who becomes permanently disabled).

In the 2010 case Lebron v. Gottlieb Memorial Hospital, the Illinois Supreme Court ruled that Section 2-1706.5 of Public Act 94-677, which placed caps on non-economic damages in medical malpractice actions, violated the separation of powers clause in the Illinois Constitution and was therefore facially invalid. Additionally, because Public Act 94-677 contains an inseverability provision, the entire Act was held void and invalid in its entirety.

=== North Carolina ===
North Carolina has statutorily capped damages from nuisance claims to the value of the plaintiff's property. The law, which overrode a gubernatorial veto to pass in 2017, was criticized in the aftermath of Hurricane Florence, which resulted in significant nuisance litigation against regional hog-farming conglomerate Smithfield Foods due to the failure of many hog-waste lagoons.

=== Maryland ===
In Maryland, non-economic damages are capped at $800,000. In personal injury cases, non-economic damages are defined as "pain, suffering, inconvenience, physical impairment, disfigurement, loss of consortium, or other nonpecuniary injury". In wrongful death cases non-economic damages are defined as "mental anguish, emotional pain and suffering, loss of society, companionship, comfort, protection, care, marital care, parental care, filial care, attention, advice, counsel, training, guidance, or education, or other noneconomic damages authorized under Title 3, Subtitle 9 of this article."

=== Michigan ===
Michigan normally has a cap of $280,000 for "noneconomic loss," which is defined as "damages or loss due to pain, suffering, inconvenience, physical impairment, or physical disfigurement, loss of society and companionship, whether claimed under section 29222 or otherwise, loss of consortium, or other noneconomic loss. However, the cap is increased to $500,000 where the plaintiff, due to physician negligence, is made "hemiplegic, paraplegic, or quadriplegic resulting in a total permanent functional loss of 1 or more limbs caused by [either] injury to the brain [or] injury to the spinal cord"; "when the plaintiff has permanently impaired cognitive capacity rendering him or her incapable of making independent, responsible life decisions and permanently incapable of independently performing the activities of normal, daily living"; or "there has been permanent loss of or damage to a reproductive organ resulting in the inability to procreate."

=== West Virginia ===
In West Virginia, non-economic damages are capped at $500,000. Non-economic damages are "(1) wrongful death; (2) permanent and substantial physical deformity, loss of use of a limb or loss of a bodily organ system; or (3) permanent physical or mental functional injury that permanently prevents the injured person from being able to independently care for himself or herself and perform life sustaining activities."

=== Wisconsin ===
In 2005, a Wisconsin court ruled that a $350,000 cap on non-economic damages in medical malpractice cases violates the state's equal protection guarantee. In Ferdon v. Wisconsin Patient's Compensation Fund, the court ruled that there was no rational relationship between the objectives identified by the legislature that were intended to prevent a medical liability crisis in Wisconsin and treating people with more severe injuries and higher non-economic damage awards different from people with lower non-economic damage awards.

In Wisconsin, non-economic damages for medical malpractice are capped at $750,000. Non-economic damages mean "moneys intended to compensate for pain and suffering; humiliation; embarrassment; worry; mental distress; noneconomic effects of disability including loss of enjoyment of the normal activities, benefits and pleasures of life and loss of mental or physical health, well-being or bodily functions; loss of consortium, society and companionship; or loss of love and affection."
