= Son of Boss =

Son of BOSS is a type of tax shelter used in the United States, one that was designed and promoted by tax advisors in the 1990s to reduce federal income tax obligations on capital gains from the sale of a business or other appreciated asset. Its informal name comes from the name of an earlier tax shelter, BOSS ("Bond and Option Sales Strategy"), which it somewhat resembles. There were at least 7 legal cases still under way at the end of 2016.

== Details ==
The term was coined by U.S. Treasury officials to describe a variety of tax shelters that sought to wipe out taxes on capital gains from the sale of a business or other appreciated asset; for example, by artificially inflating the basis of a partnership by contributing an asset paired with a contingent liability. The partnership contribution rules at the time ignored the contingent liability that effectively offset the asset. The result was an inflated basis that allowed the taxpayer to claim a loss from the partnership's subsequent unwinding. The shelters involved creating paper losses to offset real gains. All resembled an earlier shelter marketed as "BOSS," short for "Bond and Option Sales Strategy." Beginning in the late 1990s, advisers at some accounting and law firms marketed the Son of BOSS transaction in various forms. It is likely several thousand taxpayers used the shelter before 2000 when the Treasury and the Congress began taking steps to block its tax benefits.

The Son of BOSS schemes involved 1,800 people and cost the government $6 billion in lost revenue, according to Internal Revenue Service (IRS) estimates. Of the $6 billion, the government has recovered more than half. The IRS started cracking down in 2000. By 2005, 1,165 people had settled Son of BOSS cases with the IRS. The complex structures used in the schemes were difficult, however, for the IRS to unravel. Reuters News Service reported that the IRS was losing some court challenges to its crackdown.

== Significant rulings ==
In 2000, the Internal Revenue Service issued IRS Notice 2000–44, asserting that Son-of-BOSS transactions were invalid.

The Son of BOSS scheme has been ruled to be invalid for Federal tax purposes. For background, see generally American Boat Company LLC v. United States; and Klamath Strategic Investment Fund v. United States.

In IR-2005-83, Aug. 29, 2005, the IRS reported that in the largest criminal tax case ever filed, KPMG admitted that it engaged in a fraud that generated at least $11 billion in phony tax losses which, according to court papers, cost the United States at least $2.5 billion in evaded taxes. In addition to KPMG's former deputy chairman, the individuals indicted include two former heads of KPMG's tax practice and a former tax partner in the New York, New York office of a prominent national law firm.

The only Son of BOSS case which has been decided by the U.S. Supreme Court is United States v. Home Concrete & Supply, LLC, which was decided in 2012. This case concerned primarily whether the statute of limitations was properly applied, and not the validity of scheme itself.

Home Concrete & Supply was a limited liability company formed in 1999 to facilitate a Son of BOSS scheme for two North Carolina businessmen, Robert Pierce and Stephen Chandler, who owned a small oil-and-coal company. The two filed their 1999 tax returns in 2000. They were audited by the Internal Revenue Service in 2006, and were billed that year for unpaid taxes totaling $6 million. The Home Concrete partners sued, arguing the IRS violated a three-year statute of limitations on its power to claim unpaid taxes. The IRS replied it was within its power to bill taxpayers up to six years back when more than 25 percent of a taxpayer's gross income was involved. The Home Concrete partners lost in District Court but won in February 2011 on appeal. The IRS appealed and the Supreme Court in November decided to take up the case. On April 25, 2012, the Supreme Court ruled in favor of Home Concrete & Supply, stating that the six-year statute of limitations did not apply when a taxpayer understated his income by overstating his basis, only the three-year statute applied.

In the interim, the law firm that helped the Home Concrete partners set up their Son of BOSS transactions, Jenkens & Gilchrist, closed. Two of its partners were found guilty of tax evasion. Joe B. Garza of Garza and Harris (Dallas Texas) in conjunction with Deutsche Bank had created the tax instruments marketed by the law firm. Despite numerous lawsuits Garza had been using Son of a boss shelters for 2 decades and has been the subject of articles highlighting his activities in Forbes and others. In February 2018 more than 40 FBI and IRS agents raided the law offices of Joe B.Garza. On Thursday October 27, 2022 Joe B Garza was indicted on 21 charges of tax fraud and evasion in Federal District Court in Dallas, Texas. According to the indictment, Garza’s scheme allowed clients to hide approximately $1 billion dollars from the IRS and caused a total tax loss to the IRS exceeding $200 million.

As of 2023, Garza's case is still pending. If convicted, he faces a maximum penalty of 20 years in prison for each of the 18 counts of wire fraud, 20 years in prison for conspiracy to commit wire fraud, and three years in prison for each of 22 counts of aiding and assisting in the filing of false federal income tax returns

== IRS collections ==
According to the IRS, the IRS collected more than $3.7 billion from taxpayers in 2005 who voluntarily participated in a parallel civil global settlement initiative related to Son of BOSS. The BLIPS and SOS shelters are part of the Son of BOSS family of tax shelters.

https://www.justice.gov/opa/pr/dallas-attorney-charged-promoting-illegal-tax-shelter

== 2012 Presidential campaign ==
In a campaign advertisement released on August 9, 2012, incumbent President Barack Obama made specific reference to his GOP opponent Mitt Romney and Romney's presumed involvement in a Son of BOSS tax avoidance as a Marriott International board member.
