= Pain and suffering =

Legal term for the physical and emotional stress caused from an injury

Pain and suffering (also called non-economic loss or general damages) is a legal concept referring to the physical and emotional distress sustained by a person as a result of injury or wrongdoing. It forms a component of general damages, intended to compensate claimants for subjective, non-pecuniary harm not captured by medical costs, lost income, or other quantifiable economic losses.

== Definition ==
Pain and suffering encompasses two interwoven dimensions:

- Physical pain — the sensory experience of bodily injury (ache, sharp pain, loss of mobility, intrusive treatments).
- Emotional or psychological distress — such as anxiety, depression, humiliation, loss of enjoyment of life, or mental anguish.

Pain and suffering is a component of general (non-pecuniary), or intangible damages, as opposed to special (pecuniary) damages such as medical expenses or lost earnings. The distinction follows the principle that economic losses are objectively measurable, while non-economic losses are subjective.

As pain and suffering is subjective nature, courts rely on witness testimony, expert opinion, medical evidence, and judicial discretion to quantify damages. The subjective nature of the awards results in considerable unpredictability in the amount of awards for similar injuries, with significant social, cultural, and geographic variation.

== Calculation ==
Factors that can affect the amount of a damages award for pain and suffering include,

1. Severity, duration, prognosis, and treatment of the injury
2. The degree of long-term consequence, such as longer-term or permanent impairment or disability, scarring, and disfigurement.
3. The age, life expectancy, personal circumstances, and lifestyle of the injured person

Damage awards may also be affected by such factors as whether the injured person suffered from preexisting conditions, as well as through legal defenses such as comparative or contributory negligence.

Because pain and suffering is not directly measurable, there is a great deal of subjectivity in damages awards. Attempts to make that process more objective may include,

- Multiplier method: multiplying economic damages (such as medical bills, or lost wages) by a factor (e.g. 1.5 to 5).
- Per diem method: assigning a daily rate to the claimant’s suffering ($X per day), multiplied by the number of days that the injured person experiences that suffering.

== Damages limits and caps ==
Many jurisdictions impose legal constraints on awards for non-economic loss, potentially including:

- Statutory caps on pain and suffering (often imposed in medical malpractice or wrongful death cases)
- Procedural thresholds or gating mechanisms (minimum severity, impairment or percentage thresholds)
- Reduction for contributory negligence, preexisting conditions, or issues of causation

== Worldwide ==
Because pain and suffering is inherently subjective and non-pecuniary, some legal regimes require a minimum severity or impairment threshold before allowing recovery.

=== Australia ===
==== New South Wales ====
In NSW, statutory regimes impose thresholds or gates especially in personal injury, motor accidents (CTP), and workers compensation contexts. A whole person impairment (WPI) may be utilized, with that measure serving as a procedural gate, not as an assessment of actual suffering. Non-economic damage awards may be denied based upon a WPI threshold, even when an injury results in significant pain or distress.

===== Civil injuries =====
Under the Civil Liability Act 2002 (NSW), "No damages may be awarded for non-economic loss unless the severity of the non-economic loss is at least 15 % of a most extreme case.: If that threshold is met, damages are calculated by reference to a table as a proportion of a maximum non-economic loss amount, indexed and rounded.

Under the Motor Accident Injuries Act 2017 (NSW), no non-economic loss may be awarded unless the claimant has a permanent impairment exceeding 10 % whole person impairment. Damages are excluded for *threshold injuries* (i.e. injuries that do not satisfy set diagnostic or functional criteria). There is statutory explanation of how to assess whether an injury qualifies above the threshold, using history, examinations, diagnostics, and expert opinion.

===== Workers compensation =====
Under the NSW workers compensation framework, among other criteria a worker must be found to have experienced a minimum 15 % whole person impairment, as assessed by an approved specialist. The NSW impairment guidelines adopt modified versions of the AMA Guides (especially AMA5) for rating permanent impairment in workers compensation claims. The statutory workers compensation scheme generally does not grant compensation for non-economic loss, except in restricted categories (such as exempt workers) or through work injury damages.

=== United Kingdom ===
In England and Wales, pain and suffering is compensated under the head of general damages, alongside “loss of amenity.” The leading reference is the Judicial College Guidelines (JCG), published in successive editions, which provide bracket figures for a wide range of injuries. The JCG tables list guideline ranges for injuries by category (orthopaedic, head, psychiatric, sensory, scarring, etc.), factoring severity and long-term impact. Loss of amenity — the diminished ability to engage in ordinary pursuits and pleasures — is closely linked with pain and suffering and is typically assessed together.

Courts often adopt these brackets as starting points, but retain discretion to adjust based on particular facts. The Court of Appeal plays a role in reviewing and harmonising awards to help ensure consistency across England and Wales.

Scotland and Northern Ireland maintain their own assessment practices, though English JCG figures often provide persuasive guidance.

=== United States ===
In the United States, pain and suffering awards are a routine part of tort litigation. Empirical studies have found that non-economic damages often constitute the majority of total recovery in serious injury cases. A RAND Institute study found that pain and suffering accounted for roughly half of all compensatory damages in jury trials involving personal injury.

Some U.S. states impose statutory caps on non-economic damages, particularly in medical malpractice cases (e.g. California’s MICRA cap of $250,000, Virginia’s tiered caps).

Courts may reduce or enlarge jury awards that they find to be inadequate or excessive, under principles of additur and remititur.

== See also ==
- Damages
- Tort law
- Personal injury
- Workers’ compensation
