= Step transaction doctrine =

Judicial doctrine in the United States

The step transaction doctrine is a judicial doctrine in the United States that combines a series of formally separate steps, resulting in tax treatment as a single integrated event. The doctrine is often used in combination with other doctrines, such as substance over form. The doctrine is applied to prevent tax abuse, such as tax shelters or bailing assets out of a corporation. The step transaction doctrine originated from a common law principle in Gregory v. Helvering, 293 U.S. 465 (1935), which allowed the court to recharacterize a tax-motivated transaction.

== Application ==
The doctrine states:

interrelated yet formally distinct steps in an integrated transaction may not be considered independently of the overall transaction. By thus linking together all interdependent steps with legal or business significance, rather than taking them in isolation, federal tax liability may be based on a realistic view of the entire transaction.

There are three tests for applying the step transaction doctrine: (1) a binding commitment, (2) a mutual interdependence of steps, or (3) the intent of particular result.

=== Binding commitment test ===
The binding commitment test was established in Commissioner v. Gordon. Under this strict test, a court will combine a series of separate steps if the parties had a formal obligation to complete each step. This test is applied usually when there are long periods of time between steps in the transaction.

=== Mutual interdependence test ===
The mutual interdependence test combines a series of events if the steps are so interdependent that the legal relations created by one transaction would have been fruitless without a completion of the series.

=== Intent test ===
The intent, or end result, test combines a series of closely related events that do not have independent purposes. If the intent of a step was merely to serve the next step, the court may consider the steps together. This test is more concerned with subjective intent of each step than the mutual interdependence test is.

== Examples ==
- In Commissioner v. Court Holding Co., 324 U.S. 331 (1945) the Supreme Court affirmed the tax court's treatment of a liquidating dividend and sale by shareholder as a sale of the corporation.
- In Kimbell-Diamond Milling Co. v. Commissioner, 14 T.C. 74 (1950), the purchase of a corporation and subsequent liquidation were disregarded and treated as purchase of assets.

== See also ==
- Judicial doctrines to combat tax shelters
- Economic substance
