= List of United States Supreme Court cases, volume 293 =

Supreme Court of the United States
- Interactive map of Supreme Court of the United States
- 38°53′26″N 77°00′16″W
- Established: March 4, 1789; 236 years ago
- Location: Washington, D.C.
- Coordinates: 38°53′26″N 77°00′16″W
- Composition method: Presidential nomination with Senate confirmation
- Authorised by: Constitution of the United States, Art. III, § 1
- Judge term length: life tenure, subject to impeachment and removal
- Number of positions: 9 (by statute)
- Website: supremecourt.gov

This is a list of cases reported in volume 293 of United States Reports, decided by the Supreme Court of the United States in 1934 and 1935.

== Justices of the Supreme Court at the time of volume 293 U.S. ==
The Supreme Court is established by Article III, Section 1 of the Constitution of the United States, which says: "The judicial Power of the United States, shall be vested in one supreme Court . . .". The size of the Court is not specified; the Constitution leaves it to Congress to set the number of justices. Under the Judiciary Act of 1789 Congress originally fixed the number of justices at six (one chief justice and five associate justices). Since 1789 Congress has varied the size of the Court from six to seven, nine, ten, and back to nine justices (always including one chief justice).

When the cases in volume 293 were decided the Court comprised the following nine members:

Portrait	Justice	Office	Home State	Succeeded	Date confirmed by the Senate (Vote)	Tenure on Supreme Court
	Charles Evans Hughes	Chief Justice	New York	William Howard Taft	February 13, 1930 (52–26)	February 24, 1930 – June 30, 1941 (Retired)
	Willis Van Devanter	Associate Justice	Wyoming	Edward Douglass White (as Associate Justice)	December 15, 1910 (Acclamation)	January 3, 1911 – June 2, 1937 (Retired)
	James Clark McReynolds	Associate Justice	Tennessee	Horace Harmon Lurton	August 29, 1914 (44–6)	October 12, 1914 – January 31, 1941 (Retired)
	Louis Brandeis	Associate Justice	Massachusetts	Joseph Rucker Lamar	June 1, 1916 (47–22)	June 5, 1916 – February 13, 1939 (Retired)
	George Sutherland	Associate Justice	Utah	John Hessin Clarke	September 5, 1922 (Acclamation)	October 2, 1922 – January 17, 1938 (Retired)
	Pierce Butler	Associate Justice	Minnesota	William R. Day	December 21, 1922 (61–8)	January 2, 1923 – November 16, 1939 (Died)
	Harlan F. Stone	Associate Justice	New York	Joseph McKenna	February 5, 1925 (71–6)	March 2, 1925 – July 2, 1941 (Continued as chief justice)
	Owen Roberts	Associate Justice	Pennsylvania	Edward Terry Sanford	May 20, 1930 (Acclamation)	June 2, 1930 – July 31, 1945 (Resigned)
	Benjamin N. Cardozo	Associate Justice	New York	Oliver Wendell Holmes Jr.	February 24, 1932 (Acclamation)	March 14, 1932 – July 9, 1938 (Died)

== Federal court system ==
Under the Judiciary Act of 1789 the federal court structure at the time comprised District Courts, which had general trial jurisdiction; Circuit Courts, which had mixed trial and appellate (from the US District Courts) jurisdiction; and the United States Supreme Court, which had appellate jurisdiction over the federal District and Circuit courts—and for certain issues over state courts. The Supreme Court also had limited original jurisdiction (i.e., in which cases could be filed directly with the Supreme Court without first having been heard by a lower federal or state court). There were one or more federal District Courts and/or Circuit Courts in each state, territory, or other geographical region.

The Judiciary Act of 1891 created the United States Courts of Appeals and reassigned the jurisdiction of most routine appeals from the district and circuit courts to these appellate courts. The Act created nine new courts that were originally known as the "United States Circuit Courts of Appeals." The new courts had jurisdiction over most appeals of lower court decisions. The Supreme Court could review either legal issues that a court of appeals certified or decisions of court of appeals by writ of certiorari. On January 1, 1912, the effective date of the Judicial Code of 1911, the old Circuit Courts were abolished, with their remaining trial court jurisdiction transferred to the U.S. District Courts.

== List of cases in volume 293 U.S. ==
Case name	Citation	Opinion of the Court	Vote	Concurring opinion or statement	Dissenting opinion or statement	Procedural jurisdiction	Result
Radio Corporation of America v. Radio Engineering Laboratories, Inc.	293 U.S. 1 (1934)	Cardozo	8-0[a]	none	none	certiorari to the United States Court of Appeals for the Second Circuit (2d Cir.)	decree reversed
Virginia v. Imperial Coal Sales Company	293 U.S. 15 (1934)	Hughes	9–0	none	none	certiorari to the Virginia Supreme Court (Va.)	judgment reversed, and cause remanded
Detroit Trust Company v. The Thomas Barlum	293 U.S. 21 (1934)	Hughes	9–0	none	none	certiorari to the United States Court of Appeals for the Second Circuit (2d Cir.)	decrees reversed, and causes remanded
Lynch v. New York ex rel. Pierson	293 U.S. 52 (1934)	Hughes	9–0	none	none	certiorari to the New York Supreme Court (N.Y. Sup. Ct.)	writ of certiorari dismissed as improvidently granted
Pflueger v. Sherman	293 U.S. 55 (1934)	per curiam	9–0	none	none	certified question from the United States Court of Appeals for the Ninth Circuit (9th Cir.)	certified question dismissed
United States v. City of Troy	293 U.S. 58 (1934)	McReynolds	9–0	none	none	appeal from the United States District Court for the Middle District of Pennsylvania (M.D. Pa.)	judgment reversed
Gillis v. California	293 U.S. 62 (1934)	McReynolds	9–0	none	none	certiorari to the United States Court of Appeals for the Ninth Circuit (9th Cir.)	judgment affirmed
McCandless v. Furlaud	293 U.S. 67 (1934)	Brandeis	9–0	none	none	certiorari to the United States Court of Appeals for the Second Circuit (2d Cir.)	judgment reversed, and cause remanded
Long v. Ansell	293 U.S. 76 (1934)	Brandeis	9–0	none	none	certiorari to the United States Court of Appeals for the District of Columbia (D.C. Cir.)	judgment affirmed
Helvering, Commissioner of Internal Revenue v. Stockholms Enskilda Bank	293 U.S. 84 (1934)	Sutherland	9–0	none	none	certiorari to the United States Court of Appeals for the District of Columbia (D.C. Cir.)	judgment reversed
British American Tobacco Company, Ltd. v. Helvering, Commissioner of Internal Revenue	293 U.S. 95 (1934)	Sutherland	9–0	none	none	certiorari to the United States Court of Appeals for the Second Circuit (2d Cir.)	judgment affirmed
Brotherhood of Locomotive Firemen and Enginemen v. Pinkston	293 U.S. 96 (1934)	Sutherland	9–0	none	none	certiorari to the United States Court of Appeals for the Sixth Circuit (6th Cir.)	judgment affirmed
Rowley, Treasurer of Converse County, Wyoming v. Chicago and Northwestern Railway Company	293 U.S. 102 (1934)	Butler	9–0	none	none	certiorari to the United States Court of Appeals for the Tenth Circuit (10th Cir.)	decree reversed
City Bank Farmers Trust Company v. Schnader, Attorney General of Pennsylvania	293 U.S. 112 (1934)	Butler	9–0	none	none	appeal from the United States District Court for the Eastern District of Pennsylvania (E.D. Pa.)	judgment affirmed
Helvering, Commissioner of Internal Revenue v. Morgan's Inc.	293 U.S. 121 (1934)	Stone	9–0	none	none	certiorari to the United States Court of Appeals for the First Circuit (1st Cir.)	judgment affirmed
McNally v. Hill	293 U.S. 131 (1934)	Stone	9–0	none	none	certiorari to the United States Court of Appeals for the Third Circuit (3d Cir.)	judgment affirmed
Waco v. United States Fidelity and Guaranty Company	293 U.S. 140 (1934)	Roberts	9–0	none	none	certiorari to the United States Court of Appeals for the Fifth Circuit (5th Cir.)	judgment reversed, and cause remanded
Helvering, Commissioner of Internal Revenue v. Bliss	293 U.S. 144 (1934)	Roberts	9–0	none	none	certiorari to the United States Court of Appeals for the Second Circuit (2d Cir.)	judgment affirmed
Mattson v. Department of Labor and Industries of Washington	293 U.S. 151 (1934)	Roberts	9–0	none	none	appeal from the Washington Supreme Court (Wash.)	judgment affirmed
Warner v. Goltra	293 U.S. 155 (1934)	Cardozo	9–0	none	none	certiorari to the Missouri Supreme Court (Mo.)	judgment reversed, and cause remanded
Hegeman Farms Corporation v. Baldwin	293 U.S. 163 (1934)	Cardozo	9–0	Sutherland (without opinion)	none	appeal from the United States District Court for the Southern District of New York (S.D.N.Y.)	decree affirmed
Zellerbach Paper Company v. Helvering, Commissioner of Internal Revenue	293 U.S. 172 (1934)	Cardozo	9–0	none	none	certiorari to the United States Court of Appeals for the Ninth Circuit (9th Cir.)	decrees reversed, and causes remanded
National Paper Products Company v. Helvering, Commissioner of Internal Revenue	293 U.S. 183 (1934)	Cardozo	9–0	none	none	certiorari to the United States Court of Appeals for the Ninth Circuit (9th Cir.)	decrees reversed
Clifton Manufacturing Company v. United States	293 U.S. 186 (1934)	Cardozo	9–0	none	none	certiorari to the United States Court of Appeals for the Fourth Circuit (4th Cir.)	decree reversed, and cause remanded
Abrams v. Van Schaick, Superintendent of Insurance of New York	293 U.S. 188 (1934)	per curiam	9–0	none	none	appeal from the New York Supreme Court (N.Y. Sup. Ct.)	appeal dismissed
E.R. Squibb and Sons v. Mallinckrodt Chemical Works	293 U.S. 190 (1934)	per curiam	9–0	none	none	certified question from the United States Court of Appeals for the Eighth Circuit (8th Cir.)	certified question answered
Borden's Farm Products Company v. Baldwin, Commissioner of Agriculture and Markets of New York	293 U.S. 194 (1934)	Hughes	9–0	Stone and Cardozo (joint short statement)	none	appeal from the United States District Court for the Southern District of New York (S.D.N.Y.)	decree reversed, and cause remanded
Helvering, Commissioner of Internal Revenue v. Powers	293 U.S. 214 (1934)	Hughes	9–0	none	none	certiorari to the United States Court of Appeals for the First Circuit (1st Cir.)	decree reversed
McCullough v. Smith	293 U.S. 228 (1934)	McReynolds	9–0	none	none	certiorari to the North Carolina Supreme Court (N.C.)	judgment reversed
United States Mortgage Company v. Matthews	293 U.S. 232 (1934)	McReynolds	9–0	none	none	certiorari to the Maryland Court of Appeals (Md.)	judgment reversed, and cause remanded
Mitchell, Insurance Commissioner of California v. Maurer	293 U.S. 237 (1934)	Brandeis	9–0	none	none	certiorari to the United States Court of Appeals for the Ninth Circuit (9th Cir.)	judgment reversed, and cause remanded
Hamilton v. University of California	293 U.S. 245 (1934)	Butler	9–0	Cardozo (opinion; joined by Brandeis and Stone)	none	appeal from the California Supreme Court (Cal.)	judgment affirmed
Indiana Farmer's Guide Publishing Company v. Prairie Farmer Publishing Company	293 U.S. 268 (1934)	Butler	9–0	none	none	certiorari to the United States Court of Appeals for the Seventh Circuit (7th Cir.)	judgment reversed, and cause remanded
Helvering, Commissioner of Internal Revenue v. Union Pacific Railroad Company	293 U.S. 282 (1934)	Stone	9–0	none	none	certiorari to the United States Court of Appeals for the Second Circuit (2d Cir.)	judgment affirmed
Old Mission Portland Cement Company v. Helvering, Commissioner of Internal Revenue	293 U.S. 289 (1934)	Stone	7–2	none	Butler and Roberts (both dissenting in part; without opinions)	certiorari to the United States Court of Appeals for the Ninth Circuit (9th Cir.)	judgment affirmed
Gulf, Mobile and Northern Railroad Company v. Helvering, Commissioner of Internal Revenue	293 U.S. 295 (1934)	Stone	7–2	none	Butler and Roberts (without opinions)	certiorari to the United States Court of Appeals for the District of Columbia (D.C. Cir.)	judgment affirmed
Schnell v. The Vallescura	293 U.S. 296 (1934)	Stone	9–0	none	none	certiorari to the United States Court of Appeals for the Second Circuit (2d Cir.)	judgment reversed
Irving Trust Company v. A.W. Perry, Inc.	293 U.S. 307 (1934)	Roberts	9–0	none	none	certiorari to the United States Court of Appeals for the Second Circuit (2d Cir.)	judgment affirmed
Irving Trust Company v. Bowditch	293 U.S. 311 (1934)	Roberts	9–0	none	none	certiorari to the United States Court of Appeals for the Second Circuit (2d Cir.)	judgment affirmed
Helvering, Commissioner of Internal Revenue v. Twin Bell Oil Syndicate	293 U.S. 312 (1934)	Roberts	9–0	none	none	certiorari to the United States Court of Appeals for the Ninth Circuit (9th Cir.)	judgment reversed
Herring v. Commissioner of Internal Revenue	293 U.S. 322 (1934)	Roberts	9–0	none	none	certiorari to the United States Court of Appeals for the Fifth Circuit (5th Cir.)	judgment reversed
Davis v. Aetna Acceptance Company	293 U.S. 328 (1934)	Cardozo	9–0	none	none	certiorari to the Illinois Appellate Court (Ill. App. Ct.)	judgment reversed, and cause remanded
Mutual Life Insurance Company of New York v. Johnson	293 U.S. 335 (1934)	Cardozo	9–0	none	none	certiorari to the United States Court of Appeals for the Fourth Circuit (4th Cir.)	judgment affirmed
United States v. Guaranty Trust Company of New York	293 U.S. 340 (1934)	Brandeis	9–0	none	none	certiorari to the United States Court of Appeals for the Second Circuit (2d Cir.)	judgment affirmed
McLaughlin, Collector of Internal Revenue v. Pacific Lumber Company	293 U.S. 351 (1934)	Butler	9–0	none	none	certiorari to the United States Court of Appeals for the Ninth Circuit (9th Cir.)	judgment reversed
Marine National Exchange Bank of Milwaukee v. Kalt-Zimmers Manufacturing Company	293 U.S. 357 (1934)	Cardozo	9–0	none	none	certiorari to the United States Court of Appeals for the Seventh Circuit (7th Cir.)	judgment reversed, and cause remanded
Schumacher, Sheriff of Butler County, Ohio v. Beeler	293 U.S. 367 (1934)	Hughes	9–0	none	none	certiorari to the United States Court of Appeals for the Sixth Circuit (6th Cir.)	decree affirmed
George v. Victor Talking Machine Company	293 U.S. 377 (1934)	per curiam	9–0	none	none	certiorari to the United States Court of Appeals for the Third Circuit (3d Cir.)	judgment reversed, and cause remanded
Enelow v. New York Life Insurance Company	293 U.S. 379 (1934)	Hughes	9–0	none	none	certiorari to the United States Court of Appeals for the Third Circuit (3d Cir.)	judgment reversed, and cause remanded
Adamos v. New York Life Insurance Company	293 U.S. 386 (1935)	Hughes	9–0	none	none	certiorari to the United States Court of Appeals for the Third Circuit (3d Cir.)	judgment reversed, and cause remanded
Panama Refining Company v. Ryan	293 U.S. 388 (1934)	Hughes	8–1	none	Cardozo (opinion)	certiorari to the United States Court of Appeals for the Fifth Circuit (5th Cir.)	judgments reversed, and causes remanded
Shanferoke Coal and Supply Corporation v. Westchester Service Corporation	293 U.S. 449 (1935)	Brandeis	9–0	none	none	certiorari to the United States Court of Appeals for the Second Circuit (2d Cir.)	judgment affirmed
United States v. Baltimore and Ohio Railroad Company	293 U.S. 454 (1935)	Brandeis	9–0	none	none	appeal from the United States District Court for the Northern District of Ohio (N.D. Ohio)	judgment affirmed
Gregory v. Helvering, Commissioner of Internal Revenue	293 U.S. 465 (1935)	Sutherland	9–0	none	none	certiorari to the United States Court of Appeals for the Second Circuit (2d Cir.)	judgment affirmed
Taylor v. Sternberg	293 U.S. 470 (1935)	Sutherland	9–0	none	none	certiorari to the United States Court of Appeals for the Eighth Circuit (8th Cir.)	judgment affirmed
Dimick v. Schiedt	293 U.S. 474 (1935)	Sutherland	5–4	none	Stone (opinion; with which Hughes, Brandeis, and Cardozo concurred)	certiorari to the United States Court of Appeals for the First Circuit (1st Cir.)	judgment affirmed
United States v. Spaulding	293 U.S. 498 (1935)	Butler	9–0	none	none	certiorari to the United States Court of Appeals for the Fifth Circuit (5th Cir.)	judgment reversed, and cause remanded
Helvering, Commissioner of Internal Revenue v. Taylor	293 U.S. 507 (1935)	Butler	8–1	none	Stone (opinion)	certiorari to the United States Court of Appeals for the Second Circuit (2d Cir.)	judgment affirmed

[a] Hughes took no part in the case
