= Long-Term Capital Holdings v. United States =

- Court: United States District Court for the District of Connecticut
- Full case name: Long-Term Capital Holdings, et al. v. United States of America
- Decided: August 27, 2004
- Docket nos.: 3:01-cv-01290 3:01-cv-01291 3:01-cv-01711 3:01-cv-01713 3:01-cv-01714
- Citation: 330 F. Supp. 2d 122

Court membership
- Judge sitting: Janet Bond Arterton

Keywords
- Tax shelter

Long Term Capital Holdings v. United States, 330 F. Supp. 2d 122 (D. Conn. 2004), was a court case argued before the United States District Court for the District of Connecticut that concerned a tax shelter used by Long-Term Capital Management, a failed hedge fund.

The tax shelter had been designed by Babcock & Brown for Long-Term Capital to shelter its short-term trading gains from 1997.

The case was an appeal of an Internal Revenue Service denial of the plaintiffs' claim of $106,058,228 in capital losses during the 1997 tax year and associated penalties. After a bench trial, Judge Janet Bond Arterton ruled, on August 27, 2004, that the transactions employed by Long-Term Capital Holdings did not have economic substance and so were disregarded for tax purposes.
