= Frank E. Buck =

Canadian horticulturalist (1884–1970)

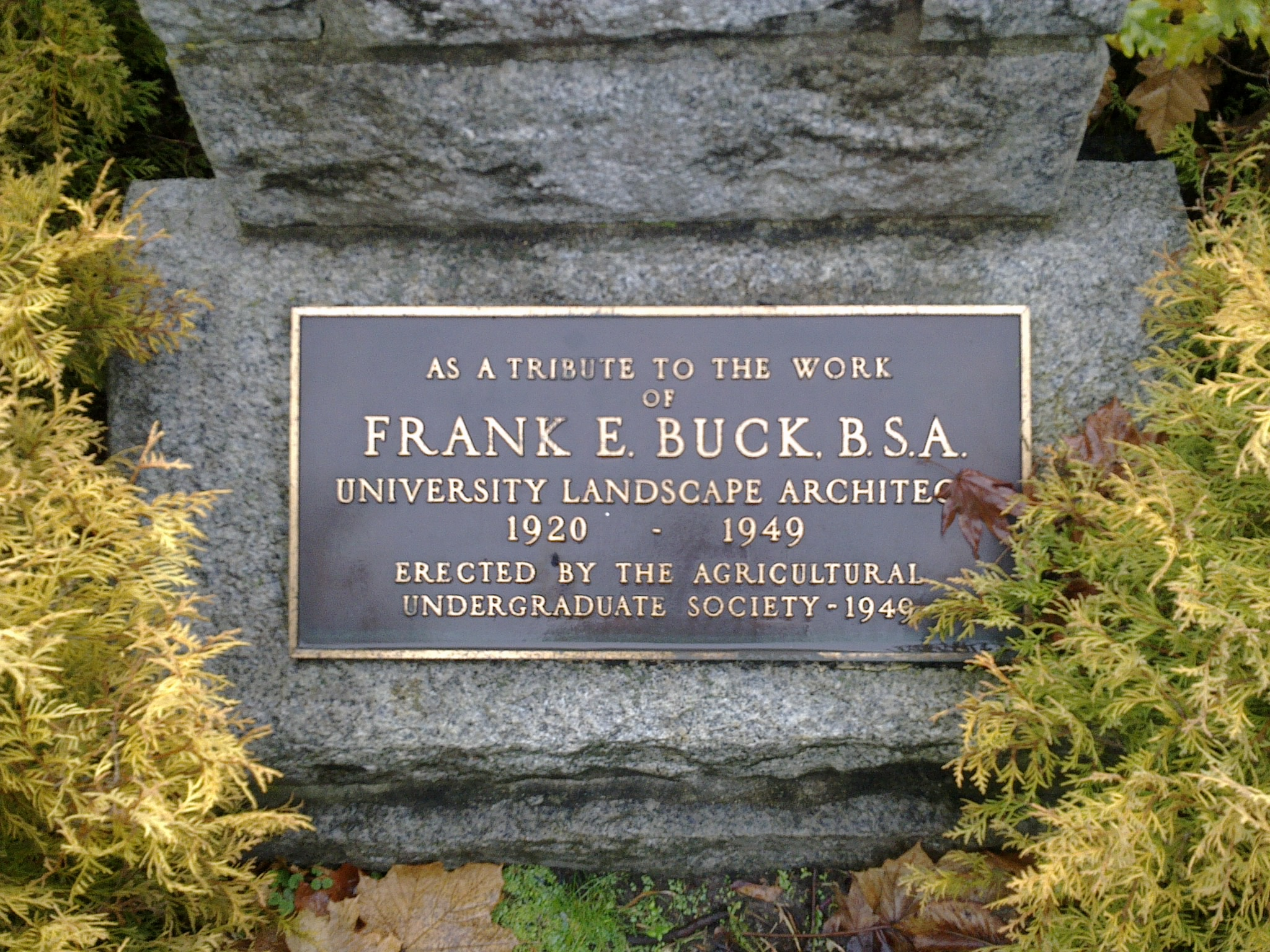
Plaque on the University of British Columbia campus

Frank E. Buck (1884-1970) was a Canadian horticulturalist.

== Biography ==
Frank Ebernezer Buck was born in 1884 in Colchester, England, and moved to Canada in 1902.

He attended Macdonald College at McGill University and received a Diploma from Cornell University. He then worked at the Central Experimental Farm in Ottawa. In 1920, he joined the Department of Horticulture at the University of British Columbia in Vancouver as a landscape architect and an assistant professor. He planned and created the forest on the UBC campus, including the Botanical Gardens. He retired in 1943 and became supervisor of campus development. He was a charter member and president of the Town Planning Institute of Canada. He was also a charter member of the Canadian Society of Technical Agriculturists, a member of the American Association for the Advancement of Science, the Canadian Horticultural Association, the National Rose Society, an honorary member of the B.C. Society of Landscape Architects, and a B.C. representative to the National Plant Registration Bureau.

He died in 1970.

On the UBC campus, the fountain in front of the University Library is dedicated to him. An endowed chair is named for him at Stanford University, where Myron Scholes is currently the Frank E. Buck Professor of Finance.
