= Tax shelter =

Method of reducing taxes owed

Tax shelters are any method of reducing taxable income resulting in a reduction of the payments to tax collecting entities, including state and federal governments. The methodology can vary depending on local and international tax laws.

== Types of tax shelters ==
Some tax shelters are questionable or even illegal:

- Offshore companies. Due to differing tax rates and legislation in each country, tax benefits can be exploited. For example, if Import Co. buys $1 of goods from India and sells for $3, Import Co. will pay tax on $2 of taxable income. However, tax benefits can be exploited if Import Co. sets up an offshore subsidiary in the British Virgin Islands to buy the same goods for $1, sell the goods to Import Co. for $3 and sell it again in the domestic market for $3. This allows Import Co. to report taxable income of $0 (because it was purchased for $3 and sold for $3), thus paying no tax. While the subsidiary will have to pay tax on $2, the tax is payable to the tax authority of British Virgin Islands. Since the British Virgin Islands has a corporate tax rate of 0%, no taxes are payable.
- Financing arrangements. By paying unreasonably high interest rates to a related party, one may severely reduce the income of an investment (or even create a loss), but create a massive capital gain when one withdraws the investment. The tax benefit derives from the fact that capital gains are taxed at a lower rate than normal investment income such as interests or dividends.

The flaws of these questionable tax shelters are usually that transactions were not reported at fair market value or the interest rate was too high or too low. In general, if the purpose of a transaction is to lower tax liabilities but otherwise have no economic value, and especially when arranged between related parties, such transactions are often viewed as unethical. The agency may re-evaluate the price, and will quickly neutralize any over tax benefits. However, such cases are difficult to prove. A soft drink from a vending machine can cost $1.75, but may also be bought in bulk for $0.25. To prove that the price is in fact unreasonable may turn out to be reasonably difficult itself.

Other tax shelters can be legal and legitimate:

- Flow-through shares/limited partnerships. Certain companies, such as mining or oil drilling often take several years before they can generate positive income, while many of them will go under. This normally deters common investors who demand quick, or at least safe, returns. To encourage the investment, the US government allows the exploration costs of the company to be distributed to shareholders as tax deductions (not to be confused with tax credits). Investors are rewarded by 1) the near instant tax savings 2) the potential massive gains if the company discovers gold or oil. In US terminology, these entities are given the generic title of "limited partnership" and in the past they may have simply been called a "tax shelter", being an archetypical tax shelter. However the IRS limited the popularity of these plans by allowing the losses to only offset passive (investment) income as opposed to earned income.
- Retirement plan. In order to reduce burden of the government-funded pension systems, governments may allow individuals to invest in their own pension. In the USA these sanctioned programs include Individual Retirement Accounts (IRAs) and 401(k)s. The contributed income will not be taxable today, but will be taxable when the individual retires. The advantage to these plans is that money that would have been taken out as taxes is now compounded in the account until the funds are withdrawn. With the Roth IRA and the newly introduced ([2006]) Roth 401(k), income is taxed before the contributions are made into the account but are not taxed when the funds are withdrawn. This option is preferred by those workers who expect to be in a higher tax bracket during retirement than they currently are. A similar system is available in the United Kingdom and is known as the Individual Savings Account.

These tax shelters are usually created by the government to promote a certain desirable behavior, usually a long-term investment, to help the economy; in turn, this generates even more tax revenue. Alternatively, the shelters may be a means to promote social behaviors. In Canada, in order to promote the vibrancy of domestically produced film and television and limit the predominance of imported American programming in that country, tax incentives were given to companies that produced Canadian television programs.

In general, a tax shelter is any organized program in which many individuals, rich or poor, participate to reduce their taxes due. However, a few individuals stretch the limits of legal interpretation of the income tax laws. While these actions may be within the boundary of legally accepted practice in physical form, these actions could be deemed to be conducted in bad faith. Tax shelters were intended to induce good behaviors from the masses, but at the same time caused a handful to act in the opposite manner. Tax shelters have therefore often shared an unsavory association with fraud.

== Judicial doctrines ==
Aside from the attempts to stop tax shelters in the United States through provisions of the U.S. Internal Revenue Code, U.S. courts have several ways to prevent tax sheltering activities from happening. The judicial doctrines have a basic theme: to invalidate a transaction that would achieve a result contradictory to the intent or basic structure of the tax code provisions at issue. The following are the judicial doctrines:

1) The Substance over form doctrine

This doctrine is based on the premise that if two transactions have the same economic result, they should have the same tax result. To achieve this similar tax result, it can be necessary to look at the substance of the transaction rather than the formal steps taken to implement it.

2) The Step transaction doctrine

Similar to the substance doctrine, the step transaction doctrine treats a series of formally separate steps as a single transaction to determine what really was going on with the transaction.

3) The Business Purpose Doctrine

Courts will invalidate a transaction for tax purposes under this doctrine when it appears that the taxpayer was motivated by no business purpose other than to avoid tax or secure some tax benefit. This judicial inquiry largely is dependent on the taxpayer's intent.

4) The Sham Transaction Doctrine

This doctrine looks for transactions where the economic activities giving rise to the tax benefits do not occur. A clear example of this doctrine is seen in Knetsch v. United States, 364 U.S. 361. Sham transactions are classified as being one of two types, sham-in-substance, or sham-in-fact.

5) The Economic Substance Doctrine

Under this doctrine, courts will invalidate the tax transaction if the transaction lacks economic substance independent of the tax considerations. This doctrines questions whether the purported economic activity would have occurred absent the tax benefits claimed by the taxpayer.

== Statutory provisions ==
In 2010, the U.S. Congress amended the Internal Revenue Code to codify and clarify the rules for applying these doctrines under the overall heading of the "Economic Substance Doctrine." The codification is found in subsection (o) of Section 7701 of the Code. Under the Code, a taxpayer must (with certain exceptions) meet both of the following tests in order for a transaction to be respected. The transaction must change, in a meaningful way, the taxpayer's economic position apart from the Federal income tax effects, and (B) the taxpayer must have a substantial purpose for entering into such transaction, apart from its Federal income tax effects. Under the Code, the term "economic substance doctrine" is defined as the common law doctrine under which Federal income tax benefits with respect to a transaction are not allowable if the transaction does not have economic substance or lacks a business purpose. The step transaction doctrine is incorporated into the codification.

== See also ==
- Asset protection
- ATTAC NGO's criticism of tax haven and underground economy
- Corporate haven
- Corporate Inversion
- Free port
- Free economic zone
- International Business Corporation
- List of offshore financial centres
- Money laundering
- Offshore bank
- Offshore company
- Offshore Financial Centres
- Offshore trust
- Panama Papers
- Paradise Papers
- Qualified personal residence trust
- Son of BOSS
- Tax exemption
- Tax resistance
- Tax exile
- Tax exporting
- Tax haven
- Tax noncompliance
