= Gregory v. Helvering =

- Supreme Court of the United States

Argued December 4–5, 1934 Decided January 7, 1935
- Full case name: Evelyn Gregory v. Guy T. Helvering, Commissioner of Internal Revenue
- Citations: 293 U.S. 465 (more) 55 S. Ct. 266, 79 L. Ed. 596, 1935 U.S. LEXIS 4

Case history
- Prior: 69 F.2d 809 (2d Cir. 1934); cert. granted, 293 U.S. 538 (1934).

Holding
- For a business reorganization to affect tax liability, the reorganization must have economic substance, not be merely an attempt to reduce tax. However, "the legal right of a taxpayer to decrease the amount of what otherwise would be his taxes, or altogether avoid them, by means which the law permits, cannot be doubted."

Court membership
- Chief Justice Charles E. Hughes Associate Justices Willis Van Devanter · James C. McReynolds; Louis Brandeis · George Sutherland; Pierce Butler · Harlan F. Stone; Owen Roberts · Benjamin N. Cardozo

Case opinion
- Majority: Sutherland, joined by unanimous

Gregory v. Helvering, 293 U.S. 465 (1935), was a landmark decision by the United States Supreme Court concerned with U.S. income tax law. The case is cited as part of the basis for two legal doctrines: the business purpose doctrine and the doctrine of substance over form. The business purpose doctrine is essentially that if a transaction has no substantial business purpose other than the avoidance or reduction of Federal tax, the tax law will not regard the transaction. The doctrine of substance over form is essentially that for Federal tax purposes, a taxpayer is bound by the economic substance of a transaction if the economic substance varies from its legal form.

== Facts ==
Evelyn Gregory was the owner of all the shares of a company called United Mortgage Company ("United"). United Mortgage in turn owned 1,000 shares of stock of a company called Monitor Securities Corporation ("Monitor"). On September 18, 1928, she created Averill Corp and, three days after, transferred the 1000 shares in Monitor to Averill. On September 24, she dissolved Averill and distributed the 1000 shares in Monitor to herself, and on the same day sold the shares for $133,333.33. She claimed there was a cost of $57,325.45, and she should be taxed on a capital net gain on $76,007.88. On her 1928 federal income tax return, Gregory treated the transaction as a tax free corporate reorganization, under the Revenue Act of 1928 section 112. The Commissioner of Internal Revenue, Guy T. Helvering, argued in economic substance there was no business reorganization, that Gregory owned all three corporations and was simply following a legal form to make it appear like a reorganization so she could dispose of the Monitor shares without paying substantial income tax. Accordingly, she understated her liability by $10,000.

== Judgment ==
In the ensuing litigation, the Board of Tax Appeals (a predecessor to today's United States Tax Court) ruled in favor of the taxpayer. See Gregory v. Commissioner, 27 B.T.A. 223 (1932).

=== Second Circuit ===
On appeal, the United States Court of Appeals for the Second Circuit reversed the Board of Tax Appeals, ruling in favor of the Commissioner. Judge Learned Hand said the following in the course of his judgment.

a transaction ... does not lose its immunity, because it is actuated by a desire to avoid, or, if one choose, to evade, taxation. Anyone may so arrange his affairs that his taxes shall be as low as possible; he is not bound to choose that pattern which will best pay the Treasury; there is not even a patriotic duty to increase one's taxes.

...

Nevertheless, it does not follow that Congress meant to cover such a transaction, not even though the facts answer the dictionary definitions of each term used in the statutory definition. ... the meaning of a sentence may be more than that of the separate words, ... and no degree of particularity can ever obviate recourse to the setting in which all appear, and which all collectively create.

...

The purpose of the section is plain enough, men engaged in enterprises ... might wish to consolidate ... their holdings. ... But the underlying presupposition is plain that the readjustment shall be undertaken for reasons germane to the conduct of the venture in hand. ... To dodge the shareholders' taxes is not one of the transactions contemplated as corporate "reorganizations."

=== Supreme Court ===
The Supreme Court of the United States also ruled in favor of the Commissioner. Although the letter of the law might arguably have been complied with, the intention of the Act was not to allow reorganizations merely for the purpose of tax avoidance. In the course of its judgment, the Court said the following.

It is earnestly contended on behalf of the taxpayer that since every element required by [the statute] is to be found in what was done, a statutory reorganization was effected; and that the motive of the taxpayer thereby to escape payment of a tax will not alter the result or make unlawful what the statute allows. It is quite true that if a reorganization in reality was effected within the meaning of [the statute], the ulterior purpose mentioned will be disregarded. The legal right of a taxpayer to decrease the amount of what otherwise would be his [or her] taxes, or altogether avoid them, by means which the law permits, cannot be doubted. ... But the question for determination is whether what was done, apart from the tax motive, was the thing which the statute intended. The reasoning of the court below [i.e., the reasoning of the Court of Appeals] in justification of a negative answer leaves little to be said.

When [the statute] speaks of a transfer of assets by one corporation to another, it means a transfer made 'in pursuance of a plan of reorganization' ... of corporate business; and not a transfer of assets by one corporation to another in pursuance of a plan having no relation to the business of either, as plainly is the case here. Putting aside, then, the question of motive in respect of taxation altogether, and fixing the character of the proceeding by what actually occurred, what do we find? Simply an operation having no business or corporate purpose-a mere device which put on the form of a corporate reorganization as a disguise for concealing its real character, and the sole object and accomplishment of which was the consummation of a preconceived plan, not to reorganize a business or any part of a business, but to transfer a parcel of corporate shares to the petitioner. No doubt, a new and valid corporation was created. But that corporation was nothing more than a contrivance to the end last described. It was brought into existence for no other purpose; it performed, as it was intended from the beginning it should perform, no other function. When that limited function had been exercised, it immediately was put to death.

In these circumstances, the facts speak for themselves and are susceptible of but one interpretation. The whole undertaking, though conducted according to the terms of [the statute], was in fact an elaborate and devious form of conveyance masquerading as a corporate reorganization, and nothing else. ... [T]he transaction upon its face lies outside the plain intent of the statute. To hold otherwise would be to exalt artifice above reality and to deprive the statutory provision in question of all serious purpose.

== See also ==
- List of United States Supreme Court cases, volume 293
