= Qualified personal residence trust =

Irrevocable split interest trusts

Residence trusts in the United States are used to transfer a grantor's residence out of the grantor's estate at a low gift tax value. Once the trust is funded with the grantor's residence, the residence and any future appreciation of the residence are excluded from the grantor's estate, if the grantor survives the term of the trust, as explained below.

Personal residence trusts ("PRTs") are irrevocable split interest trusts. The transfer of the residence to the trust constitutes a completed gift. The split interest character of the trust is as follows: the grantor retains the right to live in the house for a number of years, rent free, and then the remainder beneficiaries of the trust become fully vested in their interest. PRTs are similar by nature to other types of retained interest trusts, like GRITs, GRATs and GRUTs.

Generally, if the grantor retains an interest in the trust, then for estate and gift tax valuation purposes, his retained interest is valued at zero. However, if the retained interest is "qualified" within the meaning of United States Internal Revenue Code ("Code") section 2702(b), its value is determined under Code Section 7520.

The value of the retained interest, as will be explained in more detail below, is important for gift tax purposes. Because the transfer of the residence to the PRT is a completed gift, it is desirable to minimize the value of the gift. The gift is valued at the fair market value of the residence, less the value of the retained interest. Consequently, if the retained interest is valued at zero, the taxable gift equals the fair market value of the residence. If the retained interest is valued under Code section 7520, its value will be greater than zero, and the gift value is minimized.

Code section 7520 values the remainder interest using the term of the trust, the life expectancy of the grantor and the 7520 rate in effect for the month of the transfer. The longer the term of the trust and the higher the 7520 rate, the lower the value of the gift. The age of the grantor also matters. If the grantor is older there is a greater likelihood that the grantor will die during the term of the retained interest (when a contingent reversion is retained by the grantor).

The regulations under Code section 2702 allow two types of qualified trusts: personal residence trusts and qualified personal residence trusts ("QPRTs"). Of the two, QPRTs are more widely used because they possess a greater degree of flexibility.

A personal residence is one of the following:

1. the principal residence of the grantor;
2. one other residence of the grantor; or
3. an undivided fractional interest in either.

Up to two residences may be transferred into residence trusts, and one must be the primary residence. The other residence, usually a vacation home, may be rented by the grantor a portion of the time, but the grantor must live in the vacation home for more than the greater of 14 days or 10% of the number of days rented.

== Mortgages ==
Personal residences that are mortgaged may be transferred to a residence trust. To the extent the residence is encumbered, the value of the property transferred will be reduced for gift tax purposes. As mortgage payments continue to be made by the grantor, additional gifts are made to the remaindermen.

Some commentators suggest that the additional gifts can be avoided by having the grantor indemnify the trust for the mortgage debt. Under this analysis, the amount of the gift to the trust is the fair market value of the residence undiminished by the mortgage, and the grantor's mortgage payments do not constitute additional gifts.

== Personal residence trusts ==
To escape valuation under Code section 2702 (i.e., retained interest valued at zero), a PRT must comply with the following two primary requirements: (i) the trust may hold only one residence which must be used as the grantor's personal residence during the term of the trust; and (ii) the trust may not allow the sale of the residence during the term of the trust. Additionally, following the expiration of the residence term, sale to grantor or grantor's spouse is also prohibited.

The inability to sell the residence is a major restriction on the flexibility of a PRT and usually makes QPRTs more desirable. PRTs do not, however, have many other technical restrictions that QPRTs are subject to.

== Qualified personal residence trusts ==
Similar to PRTs, QPRTs must comply with certain requirements to avoid valuation under Code Section 2702. The QPRT requirements are as follows: (i) income must be distributed to the grantor at least annually; (ii) no distributions of principal may be made to any person other than the grantor; (iii) only one personal residence may be held in the trust, but as discussed below, certain other assets may be held in the trust, as well; (iv) to the extent the trust hold cash in excess of the amount allowed, such cash must be distributed at least quarterly; (v) the QPRT status will cease if the residence is no longer used in such capacity.

QPRTs are permitted the following: (i) the residence may be sold, but not to the grantor or the grantor's spouse (the residence may pass to the grantor's spouse without any consideration at the end of the term); (ii) if the residence is sold, the trust may continue holding the sale proceeds, so long as the cash is held in a separate bank account; (iii) cash may be added to the trust, and then held in a segregated bank account, for the payment of certain expenses connected with the residence; (iv) the trust may permit improvements to be added onto the residence; and (v) the grantor's interest may be converted into an annuity, if the trust contains provisions required by Treasury Regulations Section 25.2702-3 for a qualified annuity interest.

If the residence is sold and the trust retains the cash, then the trust must provide that it will terminate as a QPRT with respect to the cash, no later than the earlier of: (i) the date that is two years after the date of sale; (ii) the termination of grantor's interest in the trust; or (iii) the date on which a new residence is acquired by the trust. If the QPRT status of the trust terminates as to the cash, then the cash comes back into the grantor's estate.

== Income tax aspects of residence trusts ==
A residence trust (PRT or QPRT) will remain a grantor trust during the grantor's retained term. Grantor status is important, because it will allow the grantor to take mortgage interest and property tax deductions, and will also avail the grantor of the Code Section 121 gain exclusion.

Following the expiration of the residence term, the grantor status of the trust usually ceases, unless the trust is drafted in a manner to make the trust intentionally grantor following the expiration of the term. This may be advantageous if the trust holds a vacation home and the grantor wishes to deduct mortgage interest and expenses associated with that home.

== Estate and gift tax aspects of residence trusts ==
If a grantor dies during the retained term of a residence trust, the full value of the trust property is included in the grantor's estate under Code Section 2036(a)(1) (because the grantor retains the right to possess or enjoy the property). If the grantor retains a reversionary interest during the retained term of the trust, the value of the residence is included in the grantor's estate under Code Section 2033.

However, it is usually prudent to include in a QPRT a contingent reversionary interest during the retained term of the trust. If the grantor dies during the retained term, the residence is included in the grantor's estate whether or not there is a reversionary interest. But, if there is a reversionary interest, the age of the grantor now comes into the valuation of the retained interest. Because now there is a possibility that the grantor will die within the retained term and the remainder beneficiaries will then receive nothing, the value of the retained term increases and the value of the remainder interest decreases (only the transfer of the remainder interest is subject to the gift tax, so it is beneficial to decrease its value).

Following the expiration of the retained term, the residence is no longer included in the grantor's estate; provided that the grantor is not a beneficiary of the trust and does not have the right to rent the residence for less than fair market value.
