= Substance over form =

Principle in accounting

Substance over form is an accounting principle used "to ensure that financial statements give a complete, relevant, and accurate picture of transactions and events". If an entity practices the 'substance over form' concept, then the financial statements will convey the overall financial reality of the entity (economic substance), rather than simply reporting the legal record of transactions (form). In accounting for business transactions and other events, the measurement and reporting is for the economic impact of an event, instead of its legal form. Substance over form is critical for reliable financial reporting. It is particularly relevant in cases of revenue recognition, sale and purchase agreements, etc. The key point of the concept is that a transaction should not be recorded in such a manner as to hide the true intent of the transaction, which would mislead the readers of a company's financial statements.

== Examples ==
There is widespread use of substance over form concept in accounting.

=== Leasing ===
Following are examples of the application of the concept in the International Financial Reporting Standards (IFRS).

[The rule found in] IAS 17 Leases now IFRS 16 requires the preparers of financial statements to consider the substance of lease arrangements when determining the type of lease for accounting purposes. For example, an asset may be leased to a lessee without the transfer of legal title at the end of the lease term. Such a lease may, in substance, be considered as a finance lease if for instance the lease term is substantially for entire useful life of the asset or the lease agreement entitles the lessee to purchase the asset at the end of the lease term at a very nominal price and it is very likely that such option will be exercised by the lessee in the given circumstances.

A lease might not transfer ownership of the leased property to the lessee. In some circumstances, the lessee might nevertheless be required to record the leased item as an asset if the lessee intends to use the asset for a major portion of its useful life, or where the present value of the future lease payments is nearly equal to the fair value of the asset. Although the lessee is not the owner, the lessee may be required to record the asset as being owned by the lessee, based on the underlying economics of the transaction. Another example is the situation where a company short of cash sells its machinery to the bank and then leases the same property from the bank. This arrangement is called "sale and leaseback". Although the legal ownership has been transferred to the bank, the underlying economic reality for the company remain the same. Under the substance-over-form principle, the sale and subsequent leaseback are considered one transaction.

=== Inventory ===
Similarly, if two companies swap their inventories, this event is not accounted as a sale because the substance is a mere in-kind exchange, despite the possible form of valid enforceable contracts for two sales and deliveries. Likewise, a firm withdrawing inventory for internal use accounts this event in a separate account, classified as such, and not on the sale account. The principle thus maintains the sales account as reflecting only actual sales in substance (that is, items delivered to outside parties for payment), and not events that merely fit the form of sales documentation for convenience or expedience.

=== Independent contractors and employees ===
The principle strictly governs and resolves disputes of whether workers are independent contractors or employees: Tax law forbids accounting for persons who are substantially employees in the form of independent contractors. The question of which form may be applied to any given case submits to objective tests of the substance of the work. Hence substance, over form, is the rule.

== See also ==
- Frank Lyon Co. v. United States, a United States Supreme Court case
- Gregory v. Helvering, a United States court case that applied the principle to taxation
- Long-Term Capital Holdings v. United States, a case finding that a large business form lacked economic substance and did not fit the principle for tax purposes
- Structuring
