= BLIPS =

BLIPS is an acronym for Bond Linked Issue Premium Structure, or Bond Linked Investment Premium Strategy. It is a type of tax shelter involving investors who take out bank loans that the government considers illegitimate. These loans are then shifted to partnerships to claim tax losses.

BLIPS are invalid in the eyes of the Internal Revenue Service (IRS).

== History ==
BLIPS represent one of four abusive tax shelters that the Senate Permanent Subcommittee on Investigations investigated in 2003. The Subcommittee found that KPMG had sold to at least 350 people from 1997 to 2001, earning fees of $124 million. Those shelters cost the Treasury at least $1.4 billion in unpaid taxes, according to the subcommittee. In the investigation, KPMG argued that investors knew they were taking a risk that the IRS might not accept the claims.
