= Remittitur =

Procedural device in United States law

In United States law, remittitur (Latin: "it is sent back") is a ruling by a judge (usually following a motion to reduce or throw out a jury verdict) lowering the amount of damages granted by a jury in a civil case. The term is sometimes used where a judgment exceeds the amount demanded by the prevailing party, or for a reduction in awarded damages even when the amount awarded did not exceed the amount demanded but is otherwise considered excessive. The term originally denoted a procedural device in English common law, although it has long fallen into disuse in England and other common law jurisdictions, and it has evolved in American use to serve a different function than it originally performed in England.

If the motion is granted, the plaintiff may either accept the reduced verdict or submit to a new trial restricted to the matter of damages.

The term is also sometimes used in place of "remand" or a mandate—that is, moving a case from a higher court to a lower court. Under California law, the Court of Appeal issues a remittitur after an appeal is heard and decided. In contrast, the U.S. federal Courts of Appeals issue a mandate. In this sense, the term is also sometimes used in other common law jurisdictions such as Australia.

== History ==
The term remittitur originated in English common law, where it was a procedural device used by the plaintiff to correct errors in the trial record. Under 18th century English law, the jury could not award more damages than the plaintiff had requested in their complaint; when (on rare occasion) juries disregarded this rule, appellate courts could overturn the jury award and order a new trial with a new jury. To avoid that prospect, the plaintiff could use remittitur to request the trial court to reduce the jury's damages award to the amount they had requested in their complaint, thus eliminating the risk of the award being overturned on those grounds on appeal. The legality of this procedure was established by the widely cited 1791 case of Pickwood v. Wright.

In English usage (and its use in other common law jurisdictions such as Australia and New Zealand), the use of remittitur was limited to reducing jury damages which were legally invalid as being in excess of the amount the plaintiff had demanded, and it was used by the plaintiff not the defendant. While English courts did sometimes overturn the damages awarded by a jury as manifestly excessive, their only procedural device for doing so was to order a retrial with a new jury; they could not do so through a remittitur. However, in the 1822 case of Blunt v. Little (in the United States Circuit Court for the District of Massachusetts), Justice Joseph Story (who, although an associate justice of the United States Supreme Court, was acting in this case as a trial judge), decided to allow the use of remittitur by the defendant, not the plaintiff, and to use it to reduce the damages on much broader grounds than obvious legal errors. Justice Story justified this as an application of the pre-existing English common law on remittitur, but his decision did not cite any specific English (or prior American) cases in support of such a broader use, and contemporary legal scholarship largely views this broader use of remittitur as a legal innovation on Justice Story's part.

This novel use of remittitur soon became widely adopted throughout the American courts, both federal and state; its use was supported by some dicta in the 1935 Supreme Court case Dimick v. Schiedt, although that case did not directly concern remittitur, but rather additur. Some legal scholars have questioned the constitutionality of the use of remittitur in the federal courts, as a violation of the plaintiff's Seventh Amendment right to a jury trial, but the US federal appellate courts have not examined that question.

Meanwhile, in England, the country of remittitur's origin, the use of jury trials in civil cases became rarer and rarer throughout the 19th century, and was largely abolished in 1933; due to this, remittitur as a procedure for reducing a jury's damages has fallen into disuse in England. Other common-law jurisdictions have largely followed England's lead in abolishing the use of juries in civil trials, and likewise remittitur in that sense has fallen into disuse in them as well. The term still sometimes survives in the distinct sense of the procedure by which a higher appellate returns a case to a lower court.

== See also ==
- Additur
