= Defensive medicine =

Patient lawsuit mitigation by doctors

Defensive medicine, also called defensive medical decision making, refers to the practice of recommending a diagnostic test or medical treatment that is not necessarily the best option for the patient, but mainly serves to protect the physician against the patient as potential plaintiff. Defensive medicine is a reaction to the rising costs of malpractice insurance premiums and patients’ biases on suing for missed or delayed diagnosis or treatment but not for being overdiagnosed.

Physicians in the United States are at highest risk of being sued, and overtreatment is common. The number of lawsuits against physicians in the USA has had a substantial impact on the behavior of physicians and medical practice. Physicians order tests and avoid treating high-risk patients (when they have a choice) to reduce their exposure to lawsuits, or are forced to discontinue practicing because of overly high insurance premiums. This behavior has become known as defensive medicine, "a deviation from sound medical practice that is indicated primarily by a threat of liability".

In India, a rise of physical attacks on practitioners and lack of support from public and government systems are the prime reasons for defensive medicine.

== Forms ==
Defensive medicine takes two main forms: assurance behavior and avoidance behavior. Assurance behavior involves the charging of additional, unnecessary services to a) reduce adverse outcomes, b) deter patients from filing medical malpractice claims, or c) preempt any future legal action by documenting that the practitioner is practicing according to the standard of care. Avoidance behavior occurs when providers refuse to participate in high risk procedures or circumstances.

== Examples ==
In 2004, the case of Dr. Daniel Merenstein triggered an intensive debate in scientific journals and media on defensive medicine (e.g.,) Following the guidelines of several well-respected national organizations, Merenstein had explained the pros and cons of prostate-specific antigen (PSA) testing to a patient, rather than simply ordering the test. He then documented the shared decision not to order the test. Later, the patient was diagnosed with incurable advanced prostate cancer, and Merenstein and his residency were sued for not ordering the test. Although Merenstein was acquitted, his residency was found liable for $1 million. Ever since this ordeal, he regards his patients as potential plaintiffs: "I order more tests now, am more nervous around patients: I am no longer the doctor I should be".

Rates of Caesarean section have been found to increase by an average of 8% as seen after 2.5 years following a related medical error.

In a study with 824 US surgeons, obstetricians, and other specialists at high risk of litigation, 93% reported practicing defensive medicine, such as ordering unnecessary CT scans, biopsies, and MRIs, and prescribing more antibiotics than medically indicated. In Switzerland, where litigation is less common, 41% of general practitioners and 43% of internists, reported that they sometimes or often recommend PSA tests for legal reasons.

The practice of defensive medicine also expresses itself in discrepancies between what treatments doctors recommend to patients, and what they recommend to their own families. In Switzerland, for instance, the rate of hysterectomy in the general population is 16%, whereas among female doctors and female partners of doctors it is only 10%.

== Consequences ==
=== Financial ===
Defensive medical decision making has spread to many areas of clinical medicine and is seen as a major factor in the increase in health care costs, estimated at tens of billions of dollars annually in the US. An analysis of a random sample of 1452 closed malpractice claims from five U.S. liability insurers showed that the average time between injury and resolution was 5 years. Indemnity costs were $376 million, and defense administration cost $73 million, resulting in total costs of $449 million. The system's overhead costs were exorbitant: 35% of the indemnity payments went to the plaintiffs' attorneys, and together with defense costs, the total costs of litigation amounted to 54% of the compensation paid to plaintiffs.

=== Patient care ===
Theoretical arguments based on utilitarianism conclude that defensive medicine is, on average, harmful to patients. Malpractice suits are often seen as a mechanism to improve the quality of care, but with custom-based liability, they actually impede the translation of evidence into practice, harming patients and decreasing the quality of care. Tort law in many countries and jurisdictions not only discourages but actively penalizes physicians who practice evidence-based medicine.

== Similar phenomena outside healthcare ==
Defensive decision making does not only occur in health care but also in business and politics. For instance, managers of large international companies report making defensive decisions in one third to half of all cases, on average. That means, these managers pursue options that are second best for their company but protect themselves in case something goes wrong.
