= Additur =

An additur (Latin: "it is added to") is a legal term referring to the practice of a trial judge adding damages additional to the original amount awarded by the jury. It is not allowed in U.S. federal courts, as held by Dimick vs. Schiedt, 293 U.S. 474 (1935). However, Dimick was decided before Erie Railroad Co. v. Tompkins (1938), which given the rarity of additur makes it unclear whether federal courts are bound by this rule when applying state law in diversity cases.

Some American states, on the other hand, allow the practice, including California and New Jersey. It is the opposite of remittitur, which is allowed in federal law. Although this is a rarely used procedure, it is usually granted for punitive damages when it is used in state courts.
