= Economic substance =

Taxation doctrine

Economic substance is a doctrine in the tax law of the United States under which a transaction must have both a substantial purpose aside from reduction of tax liability and an economic effect aside from the tax effect in order to qualify for any tax benefits. This doctrine is used by the Internal Revenue Service to determine whether tax shelters, or strategies used to reduce tax liability, are considered "abusive". Under the doctrine, for a transaction to be respected, the transaction must change the taxpayer's economic position in a "meaningful way" apart from the Federal income tax effects, and the taxpayer must have had a "substantial purpose" for entering into the transaction, apart from the Federal income tax effects.

The economic substance doctrine was originally a common law doctrine. The doctrine was codified in subsection (o) of section 7701 of the Internal Revenue Code by the Health Care and Education Reconciliation Act of 2010.

== See also ==
- Step transaction doctrine
- Substance over form
- Gregory v. Helvering
