= Stifel (disambiguation) =

- Stifel, a financial corporation
- Stifel (surname)
- Stifel Theatre, Missouri, United States
- J.L.Stifel and Sons, garment manufacturer
