= RCGA =

RCGA may stand for:

- Royal Canadian Golf Association
- Regional Chamber and Growth Association of St. Louis, Missouri, US
