= Independence Center (St. Louis) =

Independence Center is a rehabilitation center for people with psychiatric disorders in St. Louis, Missouri. It uses the Clubhouse Model of Psychosocial Rehabilitation and is modeled after New York City's Fountain House. It was founded in 1980 by Robert B. "Bob" Harvey. IC also participates in the Transitional Employment Program (TEP), and colleague training.

== See also ==
- Mental health
- National Alliance on Mental Illness
- National Institute for Mental Health
- Clubhouse Model of Psychosocial Rehabilitation
