= Julian Onderdonk =

American painter

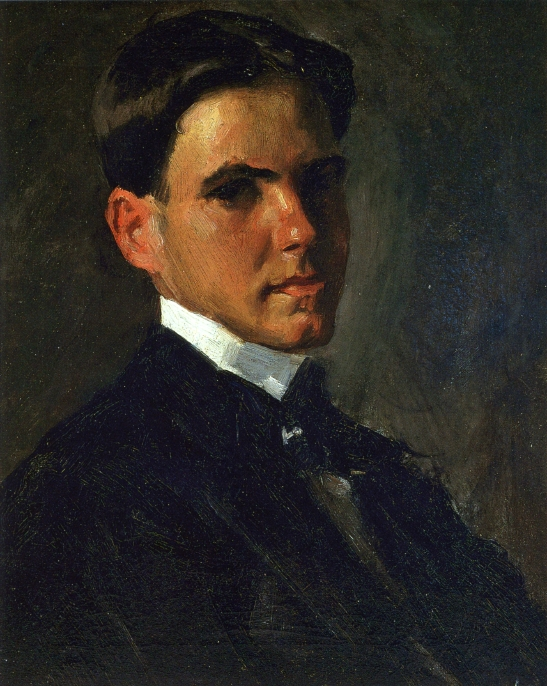
- Portrait of Julian Onderdonk (1901), by William Merritt Chase, Witte Museum, San Antonio, Texas
- Born: July 30, 1882; San Antonio, Texas
- Died: October 27, 1922 (aged 40); San Antonio, Texas
- Occupation: Impressionist painter

Robert Julian Onderdonk (July 30, 1882 – October 27, 1922) was a Texan Impressionist painter, often called "the father of Texas painting."

== Early years ==
Julian Onderdonk was born in San Antonio, Texas, to Robert Jenkins Onderdonk, a painter, and Emily Gould Onderdonk. He was the brother of Eleanor Onderdonk, also a prominent Texas painter, sculptor, and art administrator. His grandfather Henry Onderdonk was the Headmaster of Saint James School in Maryland, from which Julian's father Robert graduated.

He was raised in South Texas and was an enthusiastic sketcher and painter. As a teenager Onderdonk was influenced and received some training from the prominent Texas artist Verner Moore White who also lived in San Antonio at the time. He attended the West Texas Military Academy, now the TMI Episcopal, graduating in 1900.

== Career ==
At 19, with the help of a generous neighbor, Julian left Texas in order to study with the renowned American Impressionist William Merritt Chase. Julian's father, Robert, had also once studied with Chase. Julian spent the summer of 1901 on Long Island at Chase's Shinnecock Hills Summer School of Art. He studied with Chase for a couple of years and then moved to New York City to attempt to make a living as an en plein air artist. While in New York he met and married Gertrude Shipman and they soon had a daughter, Adrienne.

Onderdonk returned to San Antonio in 1909, where he produced his best work. His most popular subjects were bluebonnet landscapes.

President George W. Bush decorated the Oval Office with three of Onderdonk's paintings. The Dallas Museum of Art has several rooms dedicated exclusively to Onderdonk's work.

His art studio currently resides on the grounds of the Witte Museum.

Harry A. Halff and Elizabeth Halff spent twenty years gathering his works into a book they published called Julian Onderdonk: A Catalogue Raisonne. The San Antonio Museum of Art created an exhibit to coincide with the publication of the book which included 25 of Onderdonk's paintings from January 20-April 23, 2017.

== Death ==
Onderdonk died of an acute intestinal obstruction and appendicitis on October 27, 1922, in San Antonio. He was buried in Alamo Masonic Cemetery.

== Paintings ==
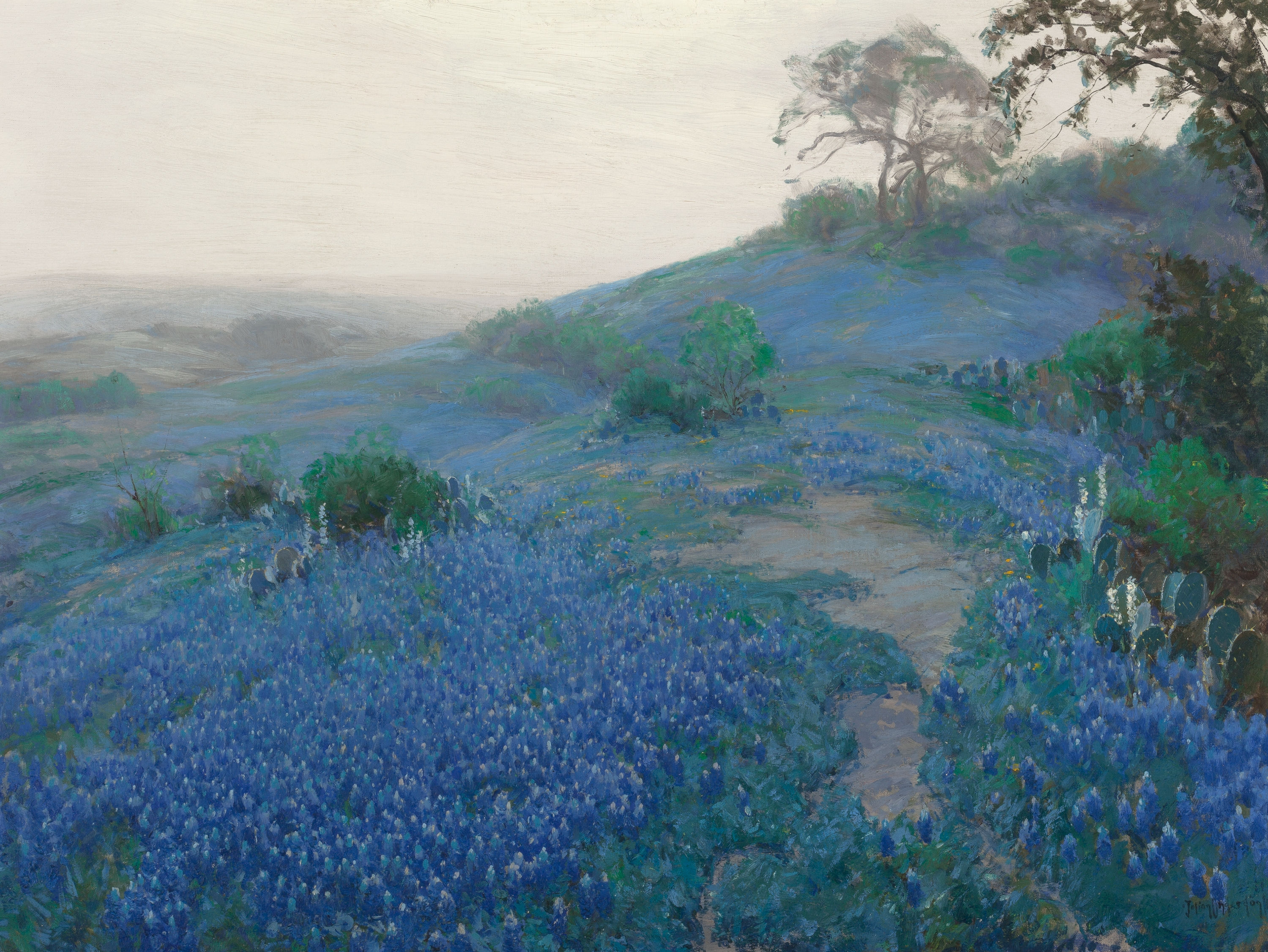
Blue Bonnet Field, Early Morning, San Antonio Texas, 1914

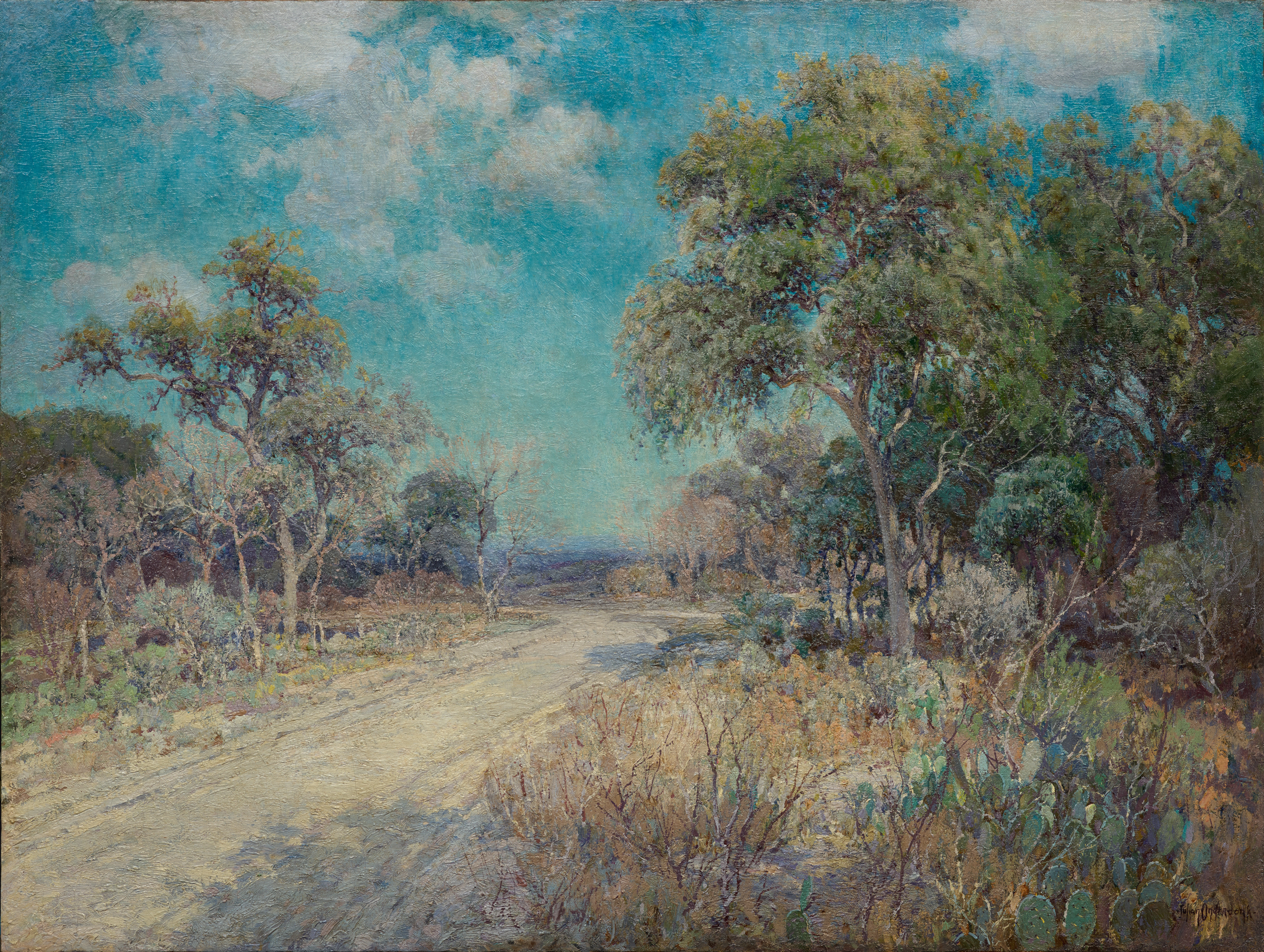
Road to the Hills,1918, Dallas Museum of Art

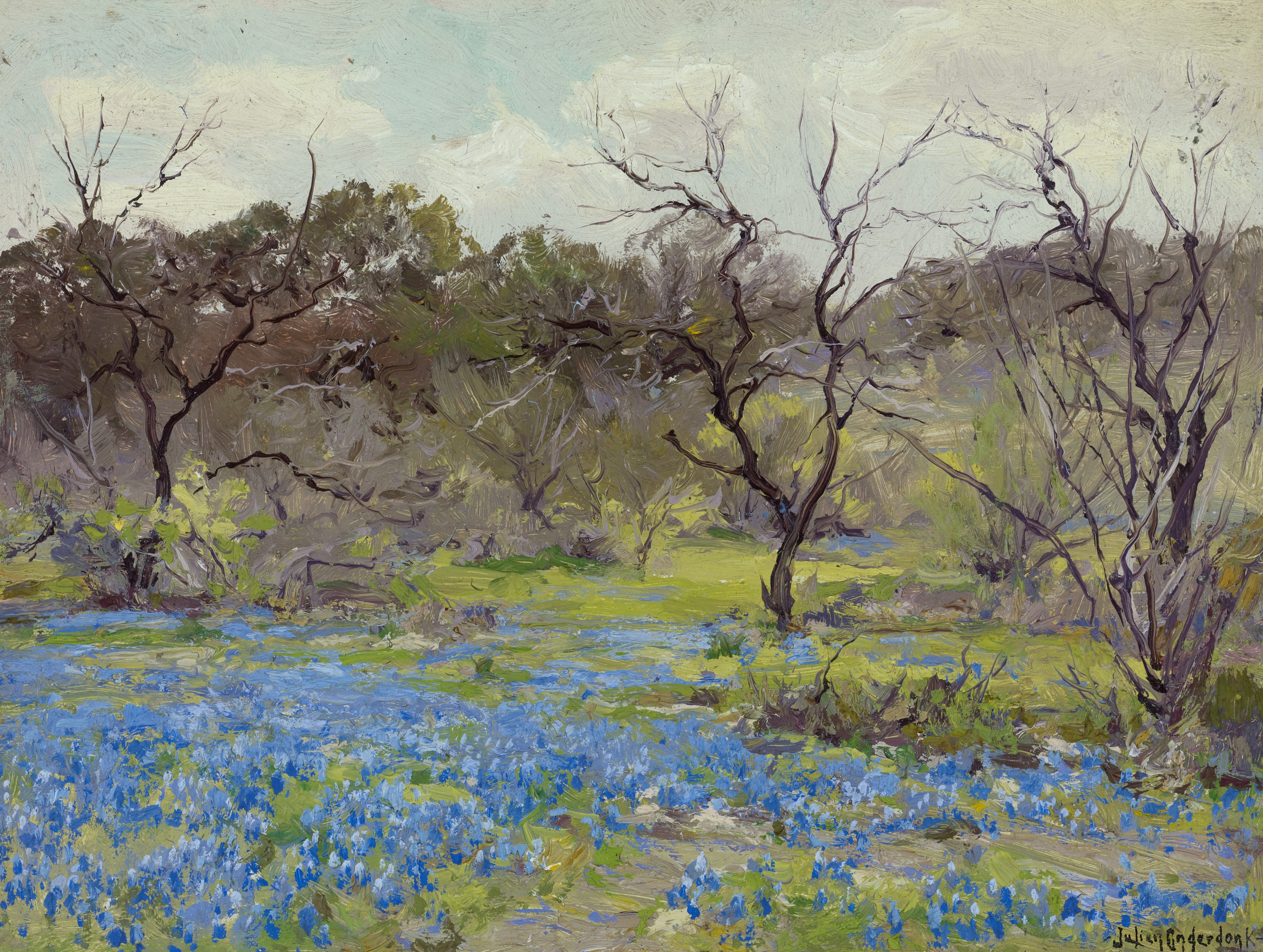
Early Spring—Bluebonnets and Mesquite, 1919

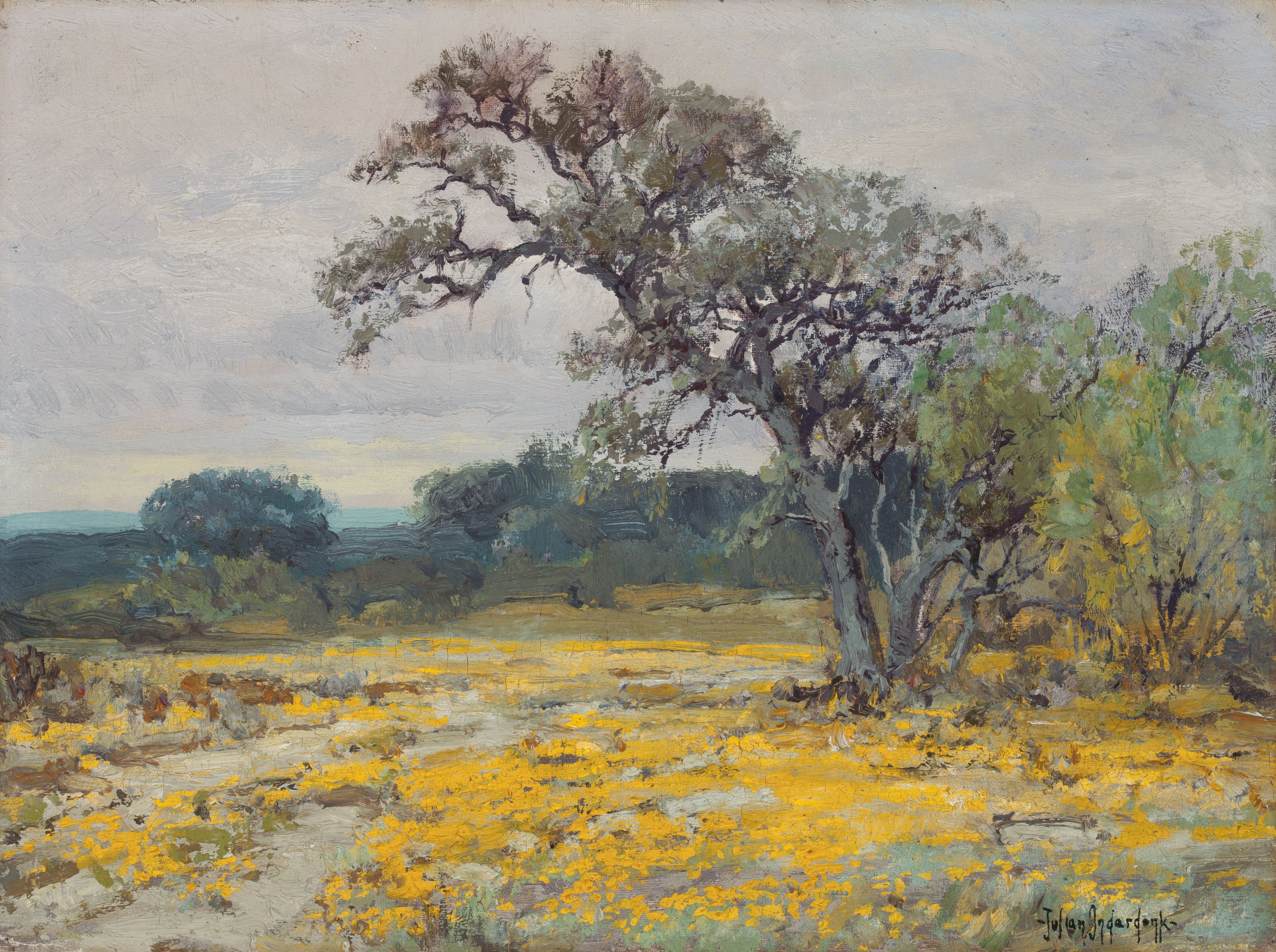
Coreopsis, Near San Antonio, Texas, 1919

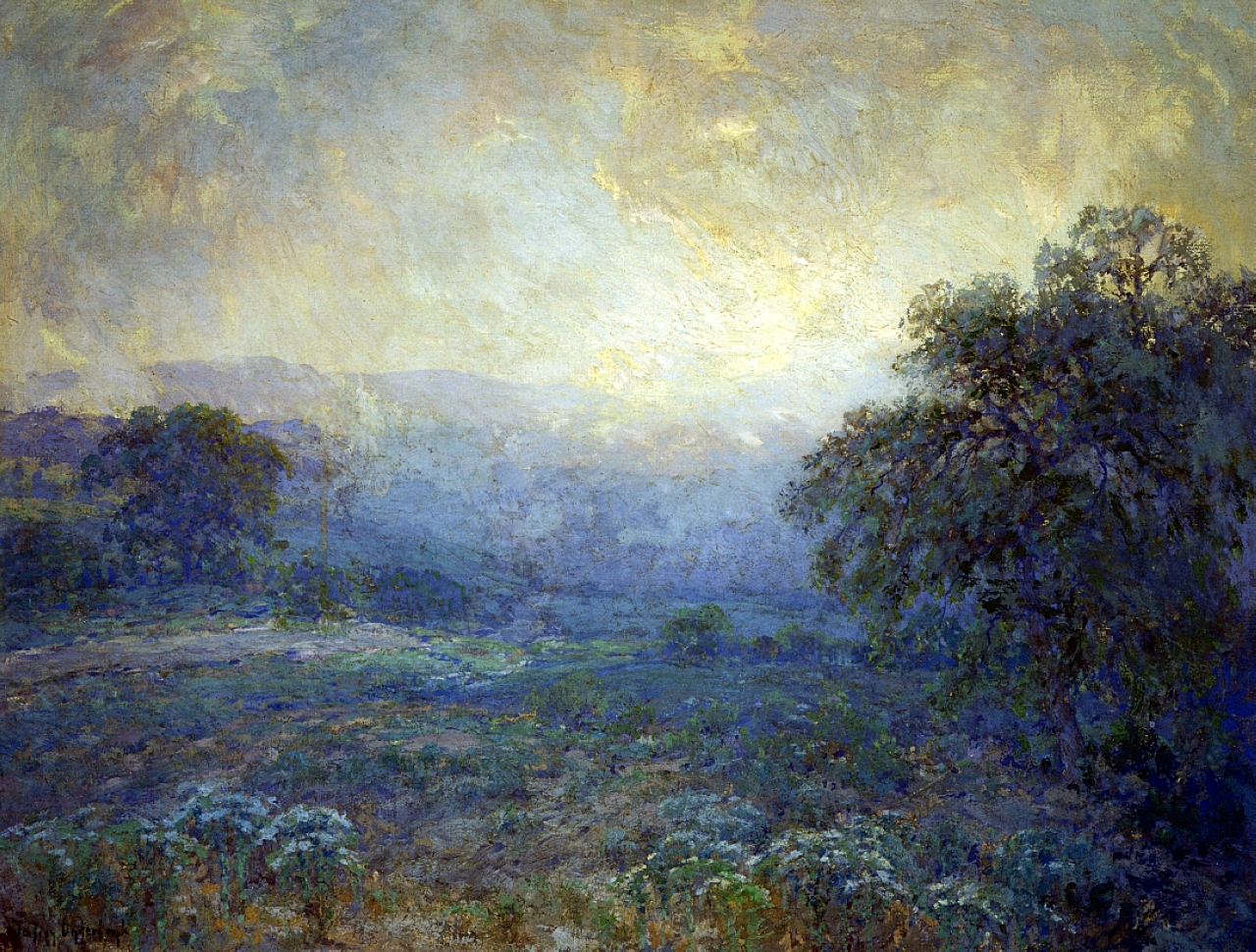
Dawn in the Hills, 1922

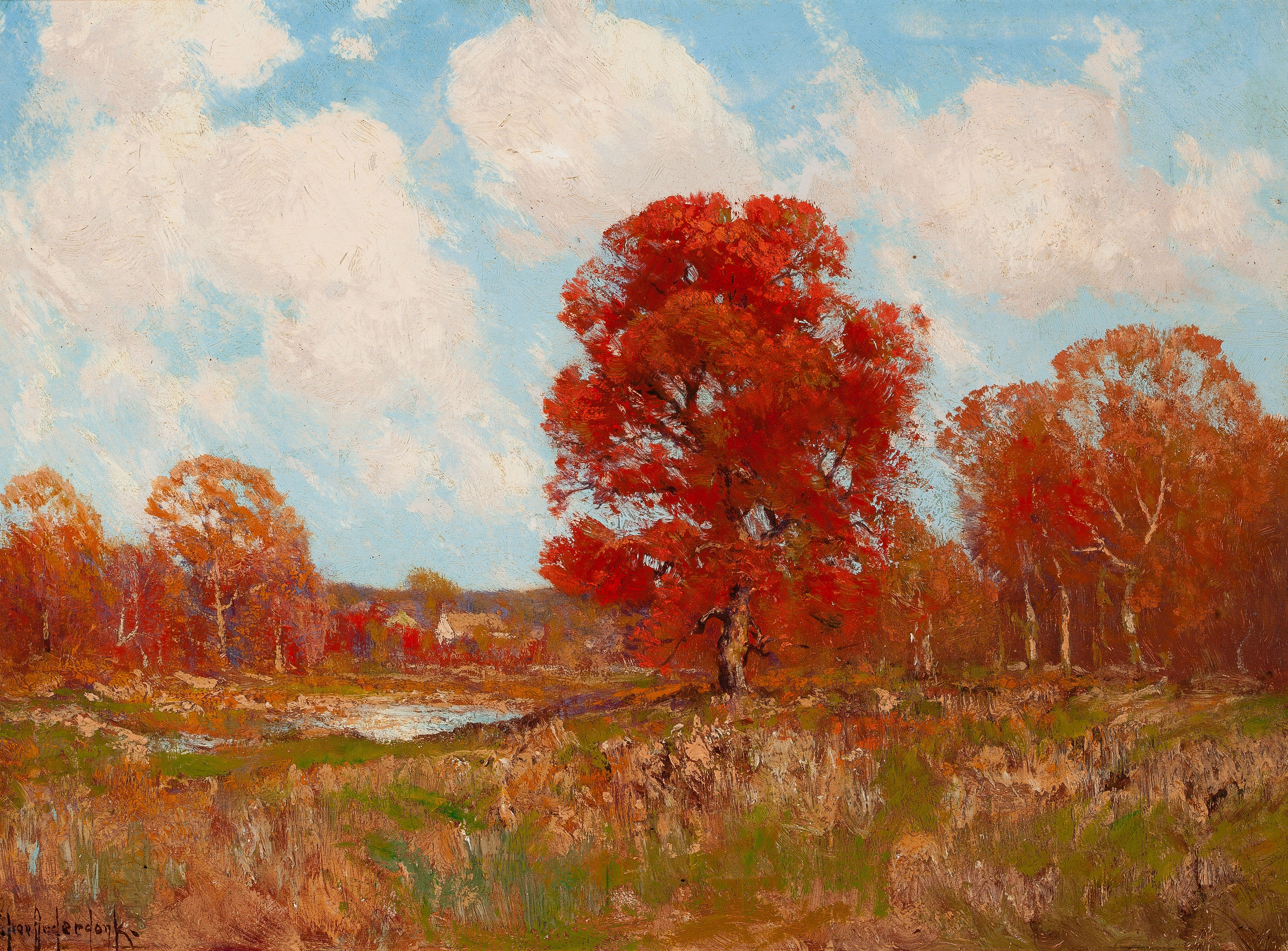
Fall Landscape

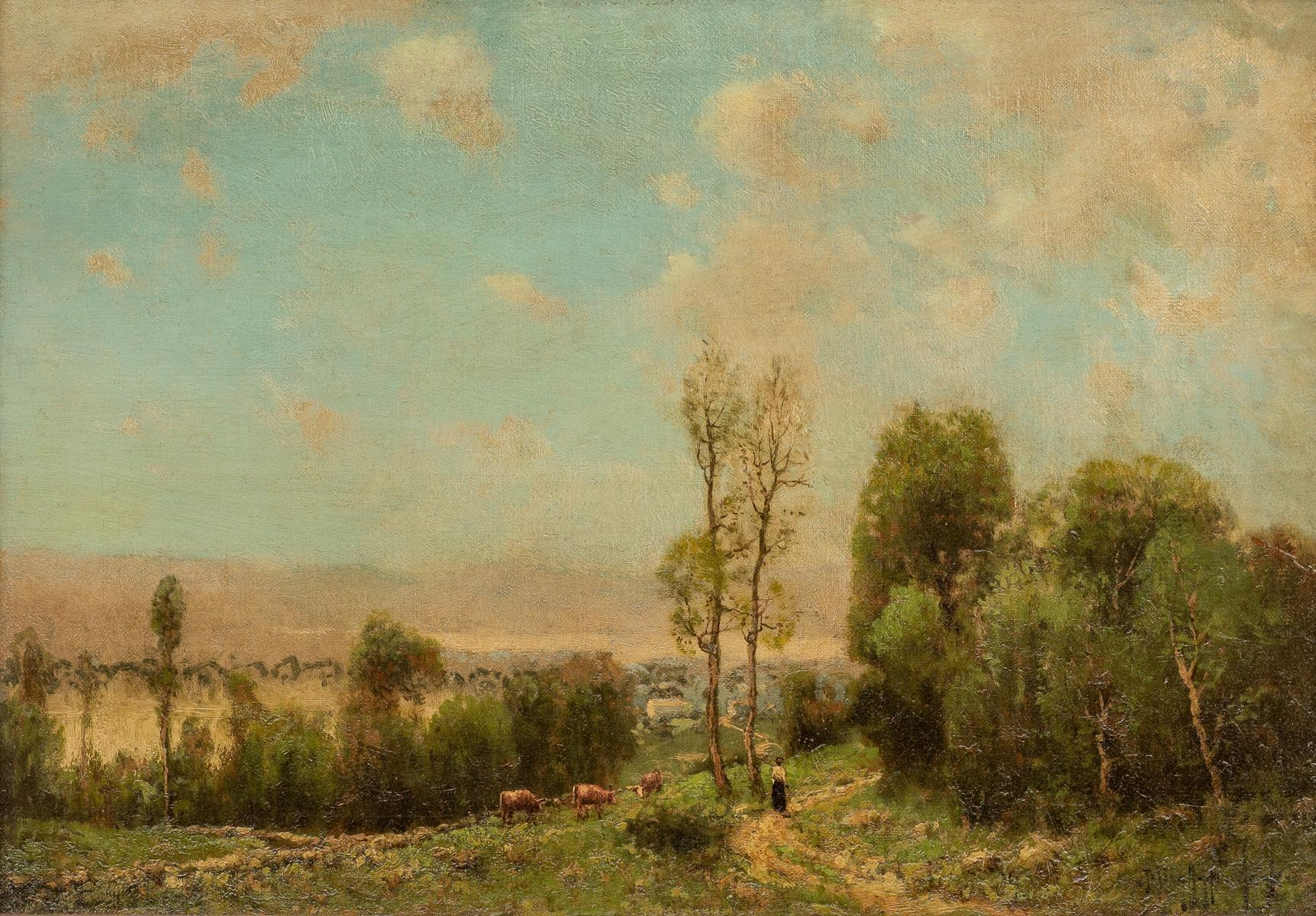
"Landscape with Figure on Path", c. 1908
