= Verner Moore White =

American painter (1863–1923)

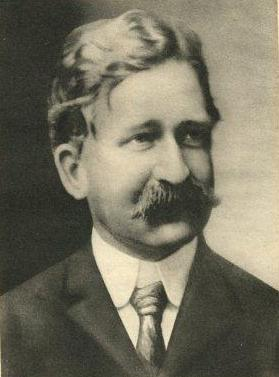
- Born: Thomas Verner Moore White; 5 October 1863; Lunenburg County, VA
- Died: 30 August 1923 (aged 59); Chautauqua, NY
- Known for: Painting
- Notable work: The Basque Shepherd, The Alamo with Señora Candelaria, The Harbor at Galveston,

Verner Moore White (October 5, 1863 – August 30, 1923), born Thomas Verner Moore White but informally known as Verner White, was an American landscape and portrait painter. White painted works for many of the business and political leaders of his time including commissions for three United States Presidents.

== Background and early career ==
White was born in Lunenburg County, Virginia to Thomas and Alice White. His father, Thomas Ward White, was a Presbyterian chaplain in the American Civil War and later served as President of the Reidville Female College and the Greensboro Female College in South Carolina.

White was taught by private tutor until when at seventeen he attended Southwestern Presbyterian University in Clarksville, Tennessee to study art. White graduated in 1884 to become a full-time artist in DeLand, Florida. The forests and swamps of north Florida and south Georgia were the subjects of many of White's early works as he developed his interest and skill in landscape painting during this period.

In 1885, White turned his attentions to portraiture when he opened a studio in Mobile, Alabama. While in Mobile, White painted portraits of some of the most influential people in The South including his painting of the last live portrait of Jefferson Davis, the former President of the Confederacy.

Jefferson Davis' daughter, Winnie Davis, had studied in Germany and France and recommended that White go to Europe in order to further study his craft before completing her portrait.

In 1887, White took her advice and moved to Europe to further his artistic studies. White studied in Paris for four years, and spent three more years traveling and painting in other European cities including in Brussels, Antwerp, Rotterdam, Liege, Rouen, Biarritz and Pau. While in Biarritz, White painted The Basque Shepherd, a painting of the dog of Grand Duke Alexei Alexandrovich, of Russia. The $300 sale of that painting to the Grand Duke financed his remaining travels, and for the rest of his career White would have an affinity for the painting of hunting dogs.

=== Gallery of hunting dog paintings by White ===
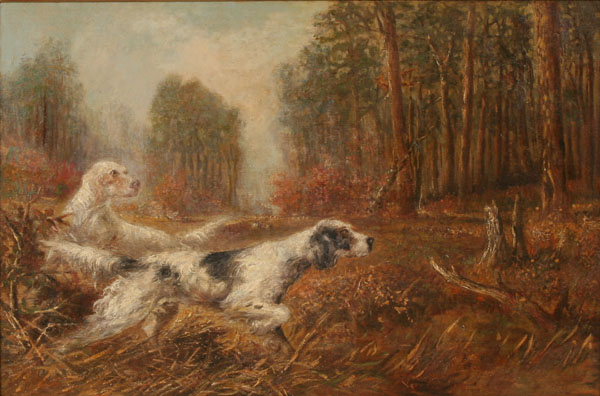

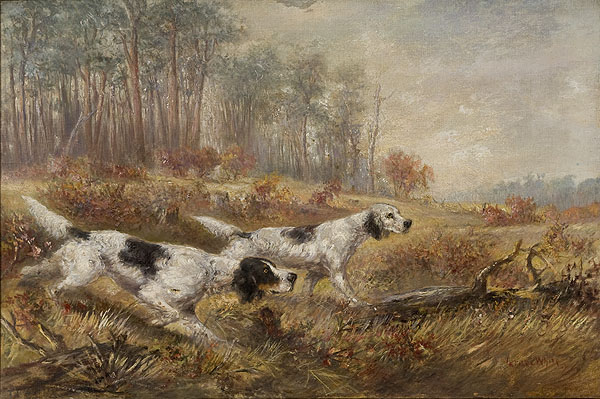

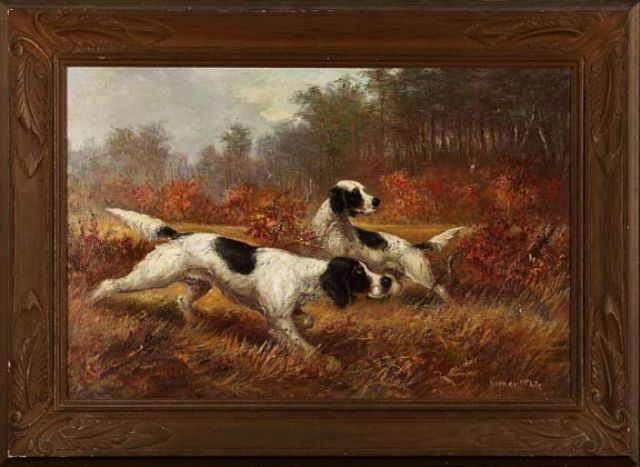

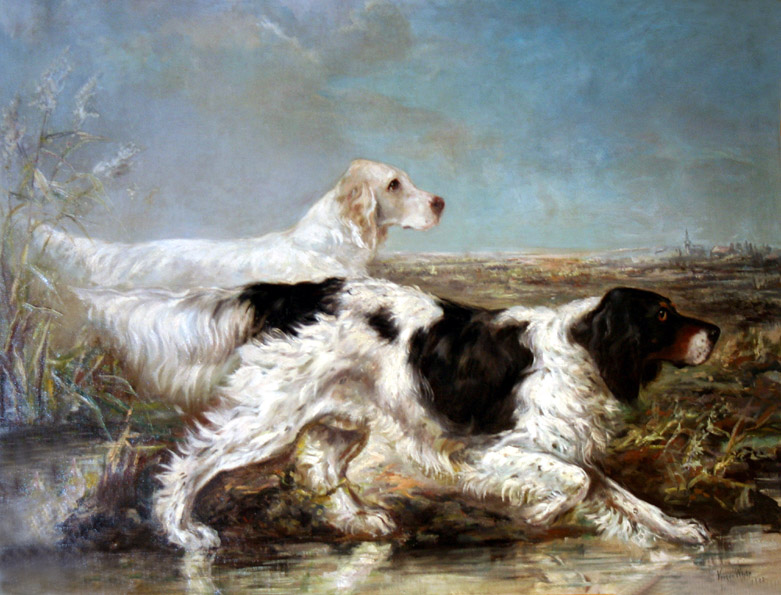

== White's work in Texas ==
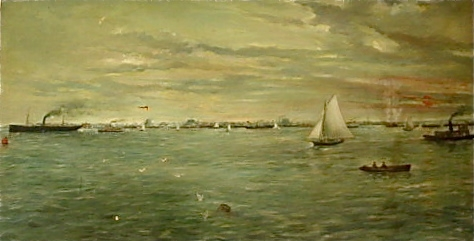
The Harbor at Galveston, Courtesy Houston Public Library

White returned to the United States in 1895 and spent the next nine years living and working in Texas. For a couple years, White traveled and painted his way through towns primarily in southeastern Texas and southwestern Louisiana. During this period, the Houston Post reported that while in Galveston, he "completed an excellent picture in oil depicting William J. Bryan on a duck hunt, critics pronounce it a real work of art."

In 1897, White moved to San Antonio where he set up a studio in San Pedro Park and attracted increasing attention and notoriety. The city fathers of San Antonio awarded White the commission for a painting of The Alamo to be given to U.S. President William McKinley and Mrs. McKinley during their visit to the city in 1901. White garnered significant public recognition with his painting titled The Alamo with Señora Candelaria. The original of the painting was given to President McKinley, and the lithograph of the image was hung in hundreds of public schools throughout Texas. White later painted an original copy of the painting that today hangs in the Alamo Museum. He briefly returned to Galveston where he had a studio which he left behind when he moved out of the city the day before the 1900 Galveston hurricane. While he survived, his studio and much of his portfolio were destroyed.

In 1902, White was awarded the commission by the World's Fair Commission for Texas to paint a series of twelve large oil paintings, that represented the natural resources and industries of Texas, to adorn the Texas exhibit at the 1904 Louisiana Purchase Exposition (also known as the St. Louis World's Fair). The scenes included artistic representations of oil fields, agricultural fields, pecan groves, granite quarries, and ranch scenes. To date, only one of White's World's Fair Commission paintings is known to survive. It is thought that maybe the others were destroyed by a fire in his St. Louis studio in 1915. The surviving panorama, The Harbor at Galveston was donated to the Houston Public Library by White's widow, Mertie Boughton White, after his death.

== White's work in St. Louis ==
White moved to St. Louis, Missouri with his newlywed wife, Mertie Boughton White, in 1904 to curate the Texas exhibit in the World's Fair. While White's Texas panoramas represented the majority of the exhibit, works from other well-known Texas artists were also included such as those from Elisabet Ney, Pompeo Coppini, and Robert Jenkins Onderdonk's The Fall of the Alamo. White earned praise at the fair including being awarded a first prize for a still life titled Basket of Peaches in the Love Orchard at Jacksonville.

After the closing of the fair, the Whites decided to stay in St. Louis and bought a home near the former fairgrounds in the St. Louis suburb of Richmond Heights. White spent the remainder of his life living and working primarily in St. Louis. He opened a studio in the city, and worked as a staff artist and special correspondent for the St. Louis Globe newspaper.

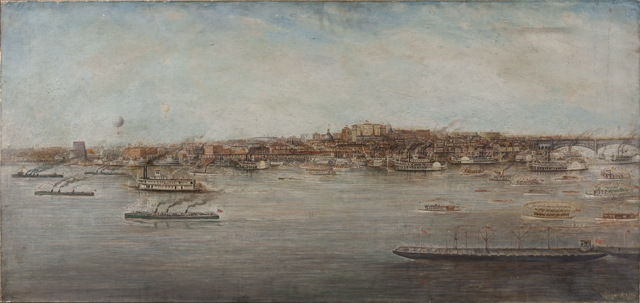
St. Louis Waterfront at Celebration of Opening of Mississippi Deeper Waterway, Courtesy of The Mariners' Museum

In 1907, White was awarded a commission from the Keokuk Commercial Club to create an aerial view painting of the dam and city of Keokuk, Iowa that was given to President Theodore Roosevelt.

White painted for a third United States President in 1909 when he painted a large oil of the fleet of steamboats that President William Howard Taft and his entourage took on a Mississippi River tour from St. Louis to New Orleans. The painting was later given to Taft by the St. Louis Chamber of Commerce, and now resides in The Mariners' Museum in Newport News, Virginia.

White painted his second work for William Jennings Bryan when the Chautauqua Association commissioned him to paint a large oil titled Bryan Day at Chautauqua which was presented to Bryan at a conference near Elsah, Illinois.

During his St. Louis period, White continued to paint marine and hunting scenes, but may have been best known for his depictions of blossoming fruit trees. The apple trees near his home in St. Louis would become one of his favorite motifs, and White would become widely recognized for the theme.

White's paintings were distributed by galleries in St. Louis, Chicago, New York City, and Boston, and special catalogues were produced for sales in Texas where he remained popular.

In his later years, White spent much of his time teaching in St. Louis and became very involved with the Chautauqua Association. On August 30, 1923, Verner White died of a heart attack at the Chautauqua Institution in Chautauqua, New York while at a banquet being given in his honor.

=== Gallery of apple blossom paintings by White ===
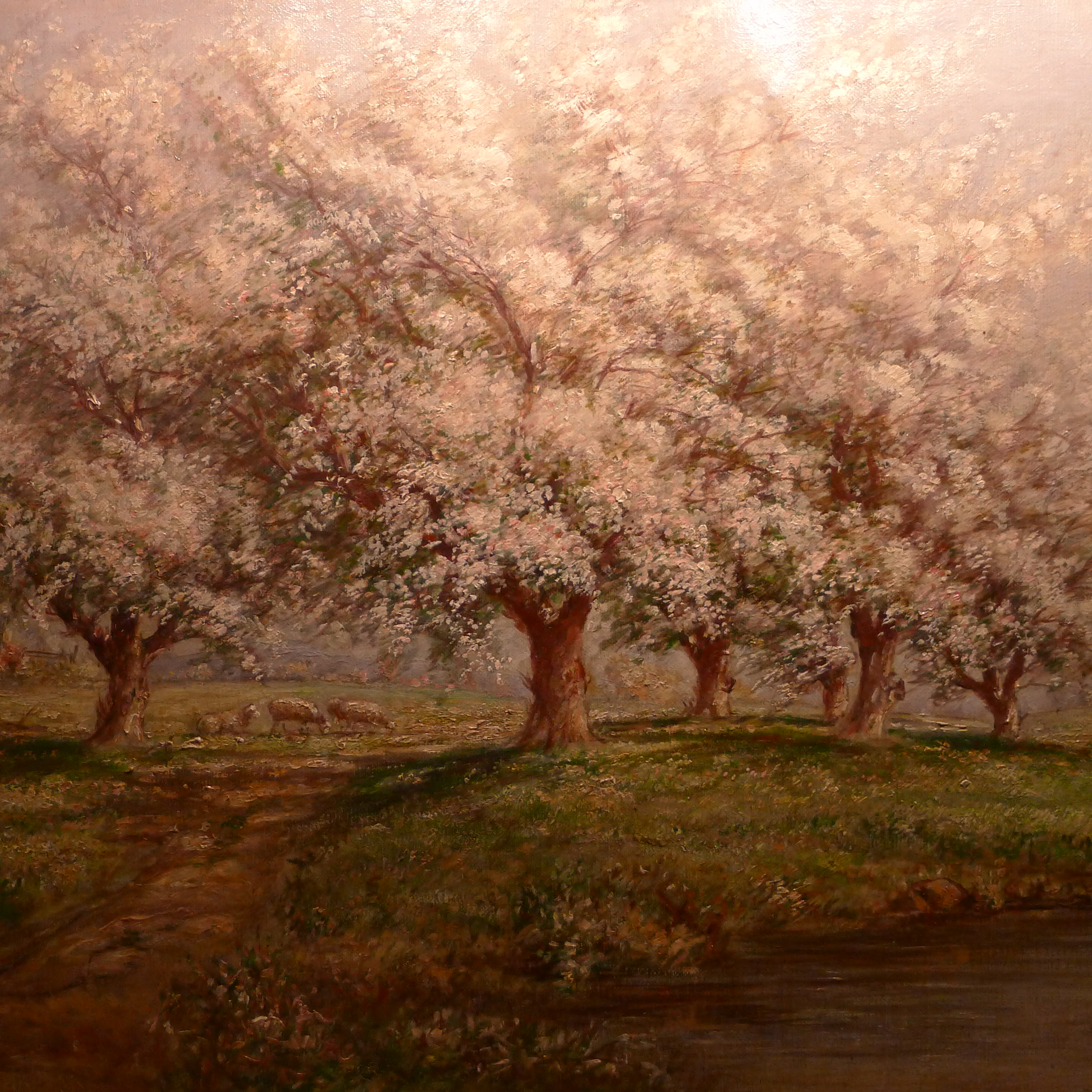

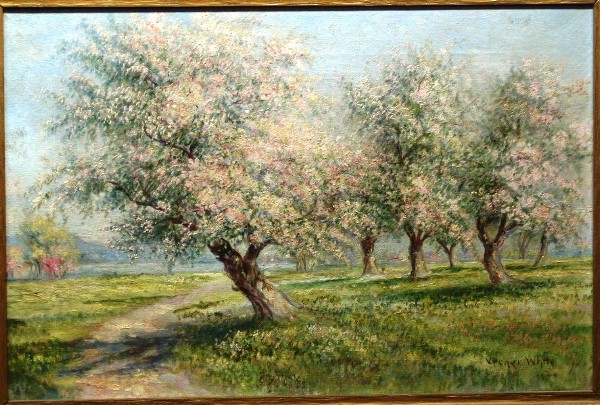

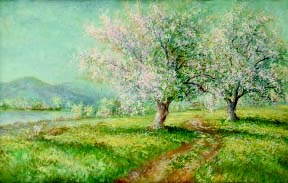

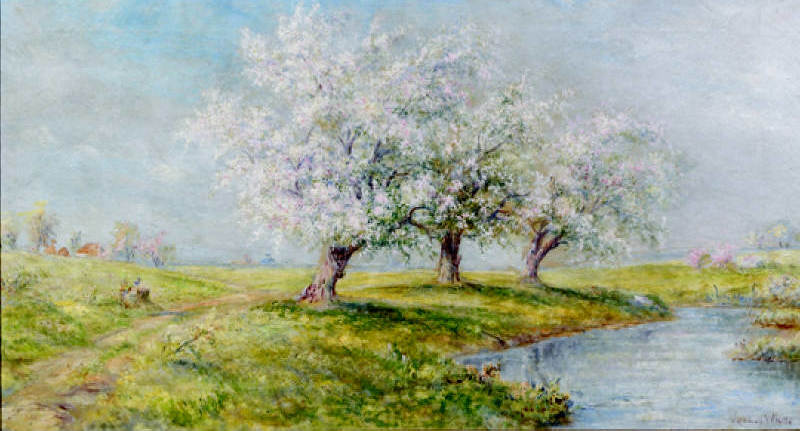
