= Eaton Partners =

American investment placement agent

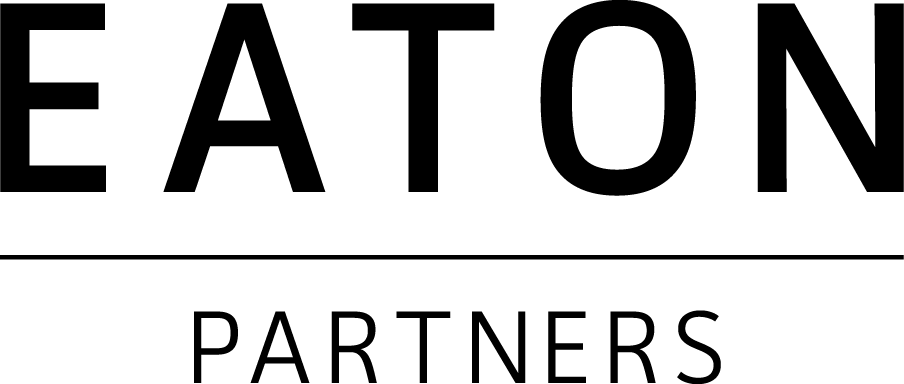
- Type: Wholly owned subsidiary of Stifel Financial
- Industry: Private Equity, Infrastructure, Real estate, Hedge funds
- Founded: 1983; 43 years ago
- Founder: Charles Eaton
- Headquarters: Rowayton, Connecticut, United States
- Products: Fund Raising, Secondary Advisory
- Number of employees: 80+
- Parent: Stifel Financial Corp.
- Website: www.eatonpartnersllc.com

Eaton Partners is a global placement agent that assists in raising capital for funds managed by some of the largest private equity firms, hedge funds, real assets and real estate funds in the world. The firm is also one of the oldest placement agents in the private funds industry. Eaton Partners raises capital primarily from institutional investors including private and public pension funds, endowment funds, family offices, fund of funds, foundations and other large pools of money that invest in alternative asset classes.

In 2009, The Wall Street Journal, citing a Preqin Ltd. league table, ranked them eighth among independent private funds placement agents.

On November 9, 2015, Stifel Financial Corp. agreed to buy Eaton Partners. The acquisition closed on January 4, 2016.

== History and background ==
The firm was founded in 1983 by Charles Eaton and has over 80 employees and nine offices: six in the US, two in Asia and one in Europe. The firm's headquarters are in Rowayton, Connecticut.

In 2010, the firm was the first placement agent in the U.S. to launch a fund raising platform for private equity firms in China.

In 2013 and 2017, Private Equity International named Eaton Partners the "Placement Agent of the Year in North America" ahead of Park Hill Group and Credit Suisse. The firm has also been recognized by PEI as "Placement Agent of the Year in Asia" since 2014, and "Secondaries Advisor of the Year in Asia" in 2016 and 2018.

In 2014, Eaton Partners won "Best Third Party Marketing Firm" of the Year by HFMWeek.

Eaton Partners is a Registered Broker-Dealer and a member of the Financial Industry Regulatory Authority (FINRA). The firm is also registered as an Introducing Broker with the Commodity Futures Trading Commission and member of the National Futures Association and Securities Investor Protection Corporation (SIPC). The firm's UK operating subsidiary is authorized and regulated by the Financial Conduct Authority and their Hong Kong-based arm is approved as a Type 1 License company under the Securities and Futures Commission in Hong Kong.

== Business lines ==
Fund raising - Eaton Partners has relationships with over 4,000 active institutional investors in the US, Europe, Asia and the Middle East. Since its founding, the firm has raised more than $100 billion globally across more than 125 different private fund vehicles.

Secondary advisory - In April 2014, Eaton Partners acquired a secondary advisory group that assists clients in the purchase and sale of limited partnership interests in various types of private funds including private equity, real asset, real estate, venture capital and illiquid hedge funds. Eaton Partners's secondary advisory team assists private funds in managing the sale of limited partnership interests within their existing funds and also in raising new capital through stapled transactions, fund recapitalizations and fund restructurings. The team also advises limited partners on the purchase or sale of fund interests in the secondary markets.

== Competitors ==
Eaton Partners competes primarily with large investment banks (most notably Credit Suisse and UBS) as well as a range of smaller firms including Atlantic-Pacific Capital, Campbell Lutyens, Probitas Partners, and Park Hill Group.

Within the secondary advisory space, other advisors also include investment banks.

== Past clients ==
In 1989, the firm helped raise capital for a fund managed by Tiger Management Corp., one of the earliest hedge funds, which was founded by Julian Robertson.

Private Equity - ICG Europe, Asia Alternatives, Summit Partners, Shoreline Capital, European Special Opportunities, Avista Capital, Black Diamond Capital Management, Landmark Partners, Tara India, Capital Today, Partners Group, JML Equity, Wind Point Partners, NorthStar Capital, CHL Medical Partners, Sterling Investment Partners, Sandler Capital Management, Swander Pace Capital, Telecom Partners, Wand Partners, Reich & Tang, Veronis Suhler Stevenson, Martin Currie, Southeastern Asset Management, Oak Investment Partners and Value Line Asset Management.

Hedge Funds - Premium Point Investments, Welton Global Investments, BlackGold Capital Management, Burgundy Asset Management, DGHM, Dominion Ventures and Tiger Management Corp., Omega Advisors, Three Bridges Capital, Providence Equity Partners, ChinaRock Capital, Permal Asset Management, Tudor, Pickering, Holt & Co.

Real Estate - Moor Park Real Estate, Landmark Partners, MacFarlance Partners, O'Connor Capital Partners, Trophy Property, Centerline Capital Group, ARCap, Lend Lease, Patron Capital Partners, and KBS Realty.

Real Assets - Ridgewood Energy, Red Kite Group, Molpus Woodlands Group, Parallel Resource Partners, Alterna Capital Partners, Quintana Capital Group, Hudson Clean Energy, Alinda Infrastructure, Tenaska and AIG.

Private Credit and General Partner Advisory & Directs – GLS Capital, Lyric Capital Partners, Lake Whillans, Trinitas Capital Management, Fundamental Partners, Portfolio Advisors, KSL Capital Partners

Emerging Managers - AE Industrial Partners, Brightstar Capital Partners, SDC Capital Partners, Ridgewood Energy, Turning Rock Partners
