= Stifel (surname) =

Stifel is a surname. Notable people with the surname include:

- Johan Ludwig Stifel (died 1881), founder of J.L.Stifel and Sons
- Michael Stifel (1487–1567), German mathematician
