= Gregg Hymowitz =

American businessman and investor (b. 1965)

Gregg S. Hymowitz
- Born: November 16, 1965 (age 60)
- Education: State University of New York at Binghamton (BA); Harvard University (JD)
- Occupations: Businessperson, activist investor, philanthropist
- Known for: Chairman, CEO, and founder of EnTrust Global
- Board member of: EnTrust, Purus Marine, flyExclusive
- Spouses: Marcella Guarino Hymowitz (m. 2013) Debby Hymowitz (div. 2007)
- Children: 6

Gregg S. Hymowitz (born November 16, 1965) is an American billionaire who is the chairman, chief executive officer and founder of EnTrust Global, a diversified alternative investment firm. Hymowitz is an activist investor, known for his bold investment strategy. According to Forbes, he has an estimated personal net worth of $2 billion as of April 2025.

== Early life and education ==
Hymowitz is from Bellmore, New York. His father and grandfather owned a sponge manufacturing business which they lost in the 1980s, and this experience inspired him to "make sure [he] always had something to fall back on." He received a Bachelor of Arts degree, Phi Beta Kappa, from the State University of New York at Binghamton in 1987. He later graduated cum laude from Harvard Law School with a Juris Doctor in 1990. He was the 1985 Harry S. Truman Scholar from New York, the 1987 British Hansard Society Scholar and the 2004 recipient of the Governor's Committee on Scholastic Achievement Award.

== Career ==
=== Early career ===
He began his career as an attorney at Skadden, Arps, Slate, Meagher & Flom where he focused on mergers and acquisitions before joining Goldman, Sachs & Co. as a vice president in 1992.

=== Entrust Global ===
In 1997, he left Goldman to establish Entrust Global (originally EnTrust Capital). When founding Entrust, Hymowitz and his colleagues personally handled asset gathering and investment decisions to build a small but strong portfolio. By the end of the year, the firm had over $1.1 billion in assets and was continuing to expand. In 2016, Legg Mason purchased a 65% stake in EnTrust for $400 million, with Hymowitz also retaining a 35% stake. Under Legg Mason, EnTrust was merged with Permal Group, assuming the name of EnTrustPermal. The firm rebranded to EnTrust Global in 2019. As of 2024, it had $18.8 billion in assets under management.

In February 2020, Legg Mason was acquired by Franklin Resources for $4.5 billion. Instead of being incorporated into Franklin Resources as a result of the deal, Hymowitz agreed to reacquire EnTrust by buying back Legg Mason's share of EnTrust. Hymowitz later sold a 20% minority stake in EnTrust to the Brunei Sovereign Wealth Fund.

EnTrust Global and GMF Capital formed EG Acquisitions, a blank-check special-purpose acquisition company. EG Acquisitions filed for a $250 million IPO in April 2021. In October 2022, it was announced that EG Acquisitions would merge with private jet company flyExclusive, taking the company public with a combined value of $600 million.

In 2018, a large portion of the capital Hudson Executive Capital LP acquired for its stake in Deutsche Bank investment came from Hymowitz's EntrustPermal. EnTrust Global has a 25% stake in Alma Capital, and is a co-investor with the US-based activist firm Third Point LLC, with a $650 million stake in Nestlé.

EnTrust Global has also provided capital to Politan Capital Management, through which it invested in healthcare companies Centene Corporation in 2021, and Masimo in 2022.

==== Maritime investing ====
In 2015, the firm launched Blue Ocean Funds, a maritime lending division. As of March 2019, they had financed more than fifty vessels with an investment of over a billion dollars in commitments, of which $600 million has been deployed, taking advantage of the lack of bank lenders in the maritime sector. In December 2020, EnTrust Global closed a $2.1 billion fundraising for the Blue Ocean Fund. EnTrust Global raised an additional $925 million for the Blue Ocean Fund between April and June 2021, and acquired Maas Capital from Dutch bank ABN Amro. On April 25, 2024, Blue Ocean completed its acquisition of alternative investment fund manager Offshore Merchant Partners, which specializes in the maritime and energy industries. In December 2024, the firm reached an agreement to acquire Belships for $450 million.

Hymowitz is also the chairman of Purus Marine, a holding company launched by Entrust in 2021 which invests in environmentally friendly and low-carbon maritime transportation and infrastructure. Purus Marine has received investments from Itochu and First Citizens Bank. It provides transport vessels to industries such as offshore wind, transportation, liquefied natural gas and logistics. The company had a fleet of over 50 low-carbon vessels in early 2023, and plans to achieve net zero carbon emissions by 2030.

Hymowitz serves as Chair of EnTrust Global's Investment Committee, Compensation Committee and Financial & Control Committee, and is a member of the Blue Ocean Executive Committee.

=== Other work ===
Hymowitz manages Jolli Four, LLC, a real estate firm based in Wellington, Florida. In 2021, the firm sold an estate in Wellington to equestrian Logan Marksbury for $12 million.

Hymowitz has been a panelist on numerous television shows such as Fox News' Cavuto on Business, Bloomberg Television, and CNBC's Squawk Box. Hymowitz has also been involved in political fundraising, and was co-chair of the Dick Gephardt 2004 presidential campaign. In 2001, Hymowitz was a speaker to the US House of Representatives during hearings on whether conflicts of interest impacted the research of sell-side analysts.

== Investment style ==
Hymowitz is an activist investor, and has commented on activist investing's potential to help investors identify the best investment opportunities. He has become known for his use of concentrated investments and "bold" investment strategies. The Wall Street Journal described him as being "behind some of Wall Street’s biggest activist bets". During the 2008 financial crisis, his investment strategy with EnTrust evolved to incorporate more co-investments and single-idea investments based on dislocations.

In 2013, Hymowitz, as head of EnTrust Capital, raised approximately $600 million for funds controlled by shareholder activists. During the COVID-19 crisis of 2020, Hymowitz stated that activist investing, by enabling the investor to have an impact on company decisions, is a good investment strategy for periods of economic dislocation. Hymowitz has summarized his business philosophy as "evolve or evaporate", a motto he adopted after a conversation with singer Usher.

== Philanthropy ==
Hymowitz is an active philanthropist, with an interest in causes related to education, social issues, and the arts. In 1995, Hymowitz established the Hymowitz Scholarship, which is awarded to full-time undergraduate students of Harpur College. Hymowitz endowed the Hymowitz Professorship of Global Health at Duke University, which was named after him. In 2017, Professor David Boyd became the inaugural holder of the chair.

Hymowitz participated in the FTI Consulting Great Charity Challenge which raised $2.5 million for Florida charities. He has also donated to the National Multiple Sclerosis Society, New York Cares, and The Retreat, a non-profit organization in The Hamptons which provides support to victims of domestic violence.

He was on the committee for the 2017 YAGP "Stars of Today Meet the Stars of Tomorrow Gala", and is part of the New York Leadership Circle for Mikva Challenge, a non-partisan civic engagement organization.

Hymowitz's wife Marcella actively promotes the arts, especially dance. She is the creative chair of the Youth America Grand Prix. During the 25th YAGP gala on April 18, 2024, YAGP unveiled the Marcella Hymowitz Creative Fellowship, which supports international dancers. The fellowship was funded with a $1 million endowment from the Hymowitz Family Foundation. The Hymowitz Family Foundation has also donated to Duke University's dance program, which two of Hymowitz's children graduated from.

== Board membership ==
Hymowitz is chairman of EnTrust Global and Purus Marine, and is on the board of flyExclusive. He was a member of the Board of Trustees at Montefiore Medical Center and served two terms as a trustee of the Riverdale Country Day School.

== Personal life ==
Hymowitz was married to Debby Hymowitz, with whom he had three children, until 2007. Hymowitz later married Marcella Guarino Hymowitz in 2013, and they have three children. In 2021, Hymowitz and his wife Marcella purchased five acres of ocean-front property in Parrot Cay from Bruce Willis for $6 million.
