= Robert Jenkins Onderdonk =

American painter

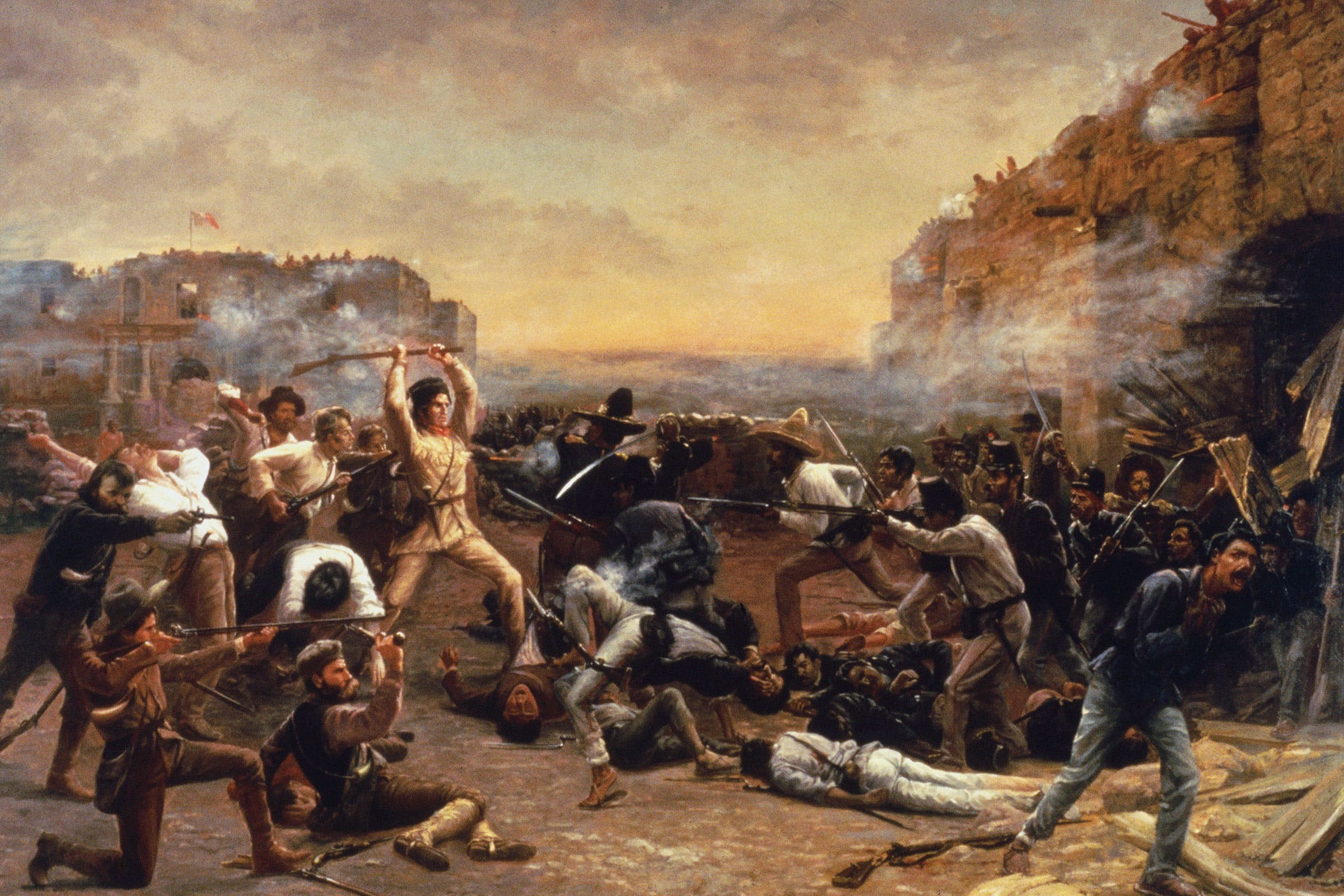
- Fall of The Alamo, oil on canvas, 1903, Texas Governor's Mansion
- Born: January 16, 1852; St. Timothy's Hall, Catonsville, Maryland
- Died: July 2, 1917 (aged 65); San Antonio, Texas
- Education: National Academy of Design, Art Students League (William Merritt Chase, James Carroll Beckwith)
- Known for: Painting
- Notable work: Fall of the Alamo

Robert Jenkins Onderdonk (January 16, 1852 – July 2, 1917) was an American painter and art teacher, born in Catonsville, Maryland. An important artist in the first stage of Texas art, he was a long-time art teacher in San Antonio and Dallas, where he formed art associations and leagues; for his contributions to the culture of art and painting in Texas he is known as the "Dean of Texas's Artists."

== Biography ==
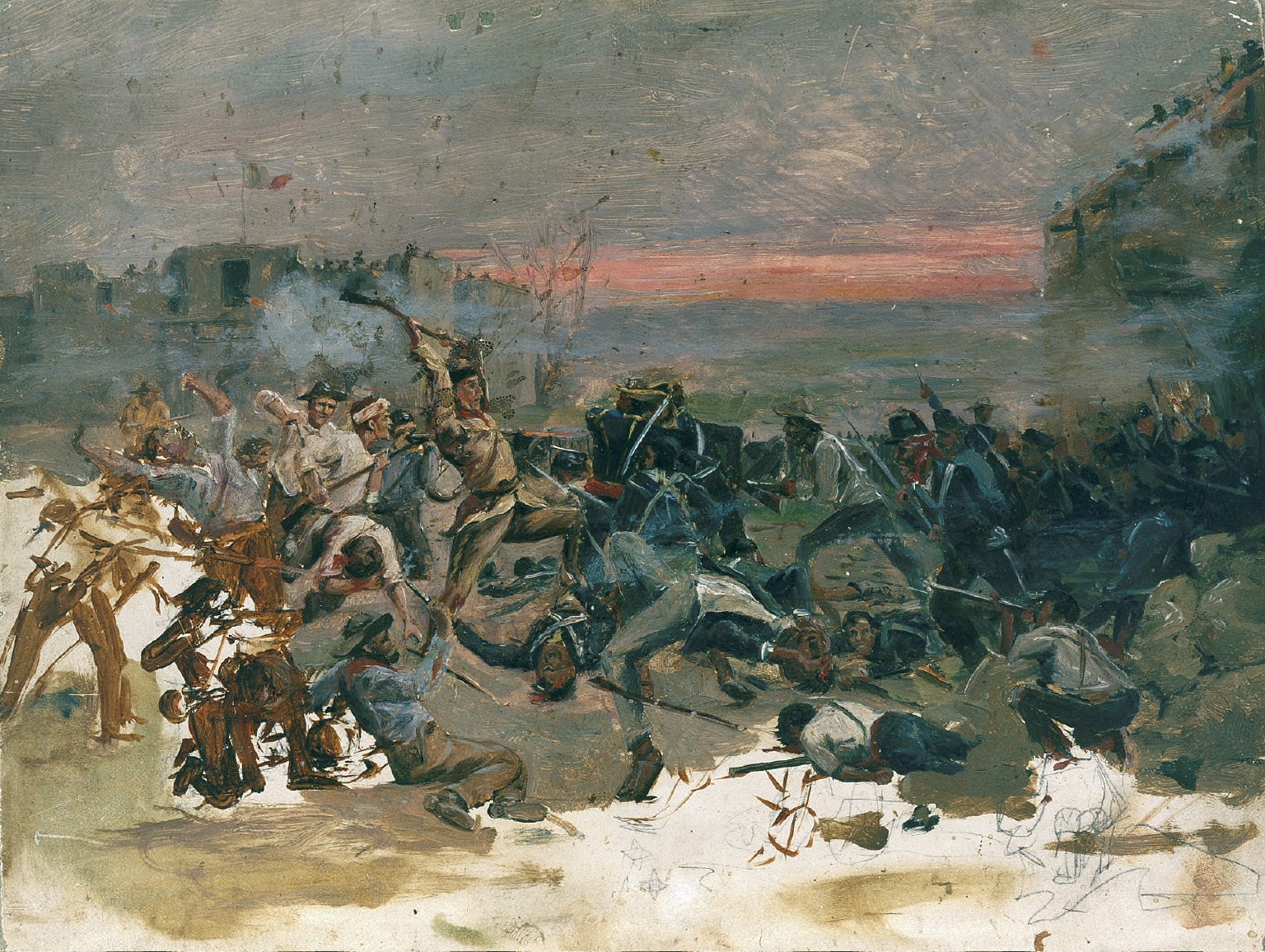
Sketch for the Fall of Alamo, 1901, Dallas Museum of Art

Robert came from a "distinguished and cultured Dutch family." His father was the Headmaster of Saint James School near Hagerstown, MD, between 1869 and his death in 1895, and had served as the President of the Maryland Agricultural College (now the University of Maryland) between 1861 and 1864. His great uncles were bishops of the Episcopal Church. Robert Jenkins Onderdonk studied art at the National Academy of Design and the Art Students League of New York in the 1870s. Among his teachers were William Merritt Chase and James Carroll Beckwith.

R. J. Onderdonk went to Texas in 1878. William Robert Negley, a friend from Maryland, had already moved to Texas to begin ranching. Robert married Emily Gould in 1881 and they had three children. He hoped to execute portraits for rich Texas citizens and make enough money to travel to Europe. He eventually stayed in Texas for thirty-eight years, where he painted and taught.

Robert was a founder of the first art clubs in Texas. He assisted in organizing "The Brass Mug Club," a group of San Antonio artists that would go out into the Texas Hill Country to paint. The club included José Arpa, Leo Cotton, Rolla Taylor, Tom Brown and Ernst Raba.

In San Antonio, he founded an art association for women painters, the Van Dyck club, which later became the San Antonio Arts League; his daughter Eleanor was an important member and organizer. In 1893 in Dallas, he co-founded the Art Students League of Dallas, pupils of which displayed their paintings each year at the State Fair of Texas.

Onderdonk's masterpiece, the 1903 painting Fall of the Alamo, was displayed at the 1904 Louisiana Purchase Exposition in St. Louis, and is now held in the Texas State Archives. Occupying central position in the painting is Davy Crockett, a depiction reproduced countless times in print; Crockett is portrayed in iconic style, "swinging his flintlock over his head to club the Mexicans advancing through a hanging cloud of gun smoke." According to Fisk's A History of Texas Artists, he would have been ranked one of America's finest artists if he had spent more time painting rather than teaching.

Two of R. J. Onderdonk's three children also made their mark in Texas art: Eleanor (1884–1964) was a respected miniaturist, and Julian Onderdonk (1882–1922) became known as the "bluebonnet painter." Julian attended the West Texas Military Academy founded in 1893 and, like his father Robert, studied painting in New York with William Merritt Chase before returning to Texas in 1909.

Robert died in 1917 at the age of sixty-five at his home in San Antonio. His works are in the collections of the Witte Museum, the Stark Museum of Art, the Dallas Museum of Art, and the Texas State Library.

== Artwork ==
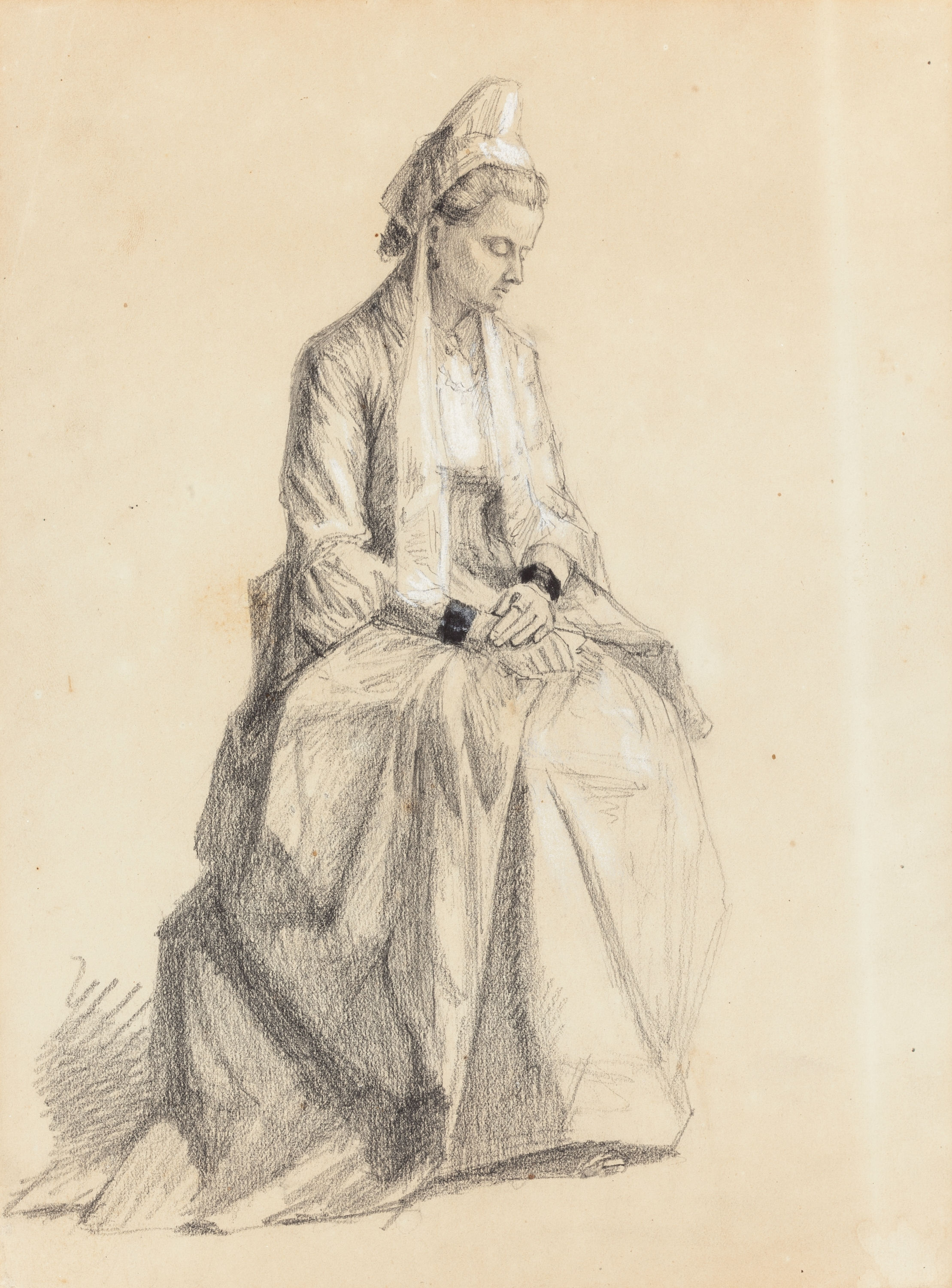
Portrait of a Seated Woman, pencil on paper, private collection.

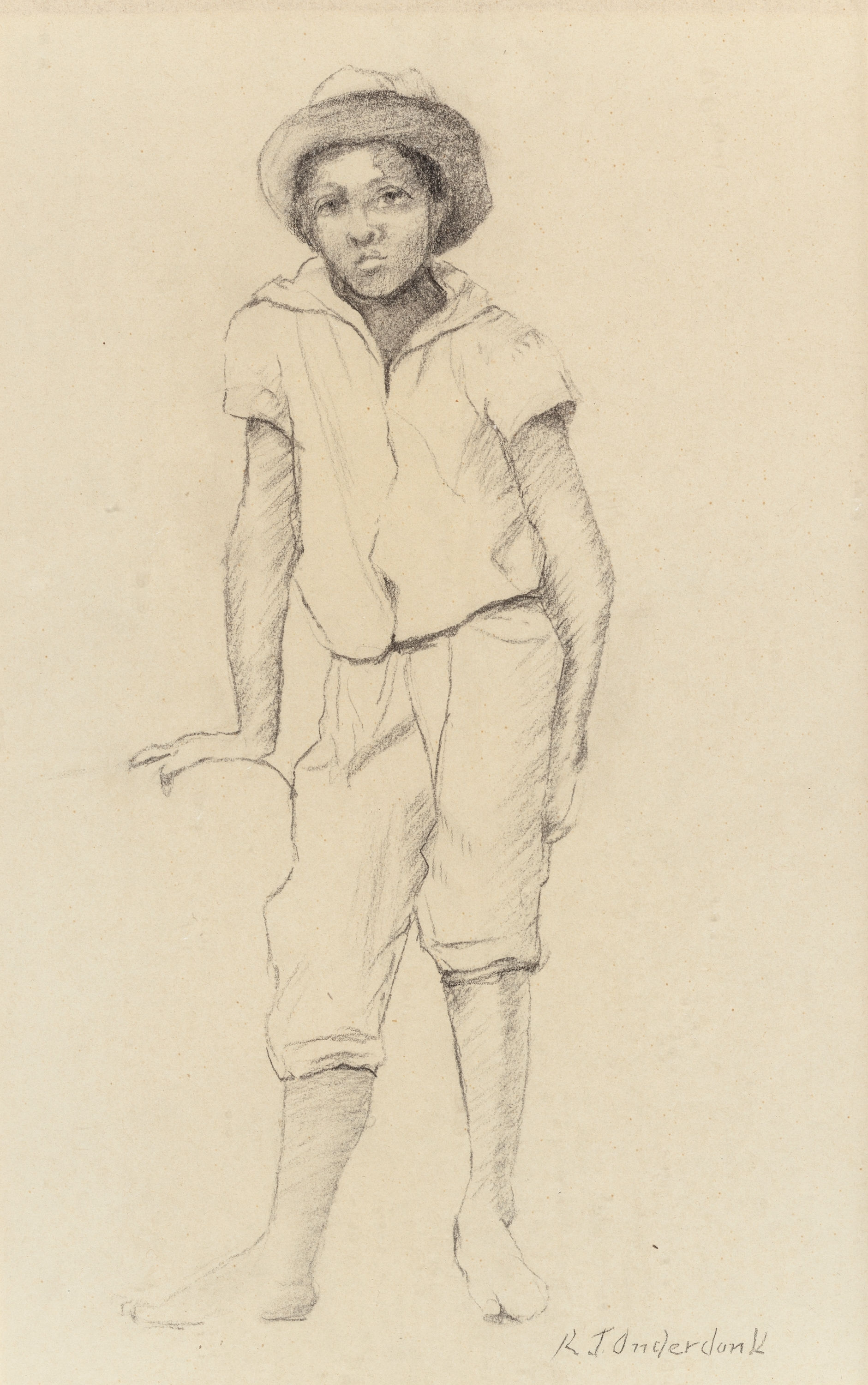
A Portrait of a Boy, pencil on paper, private collection.

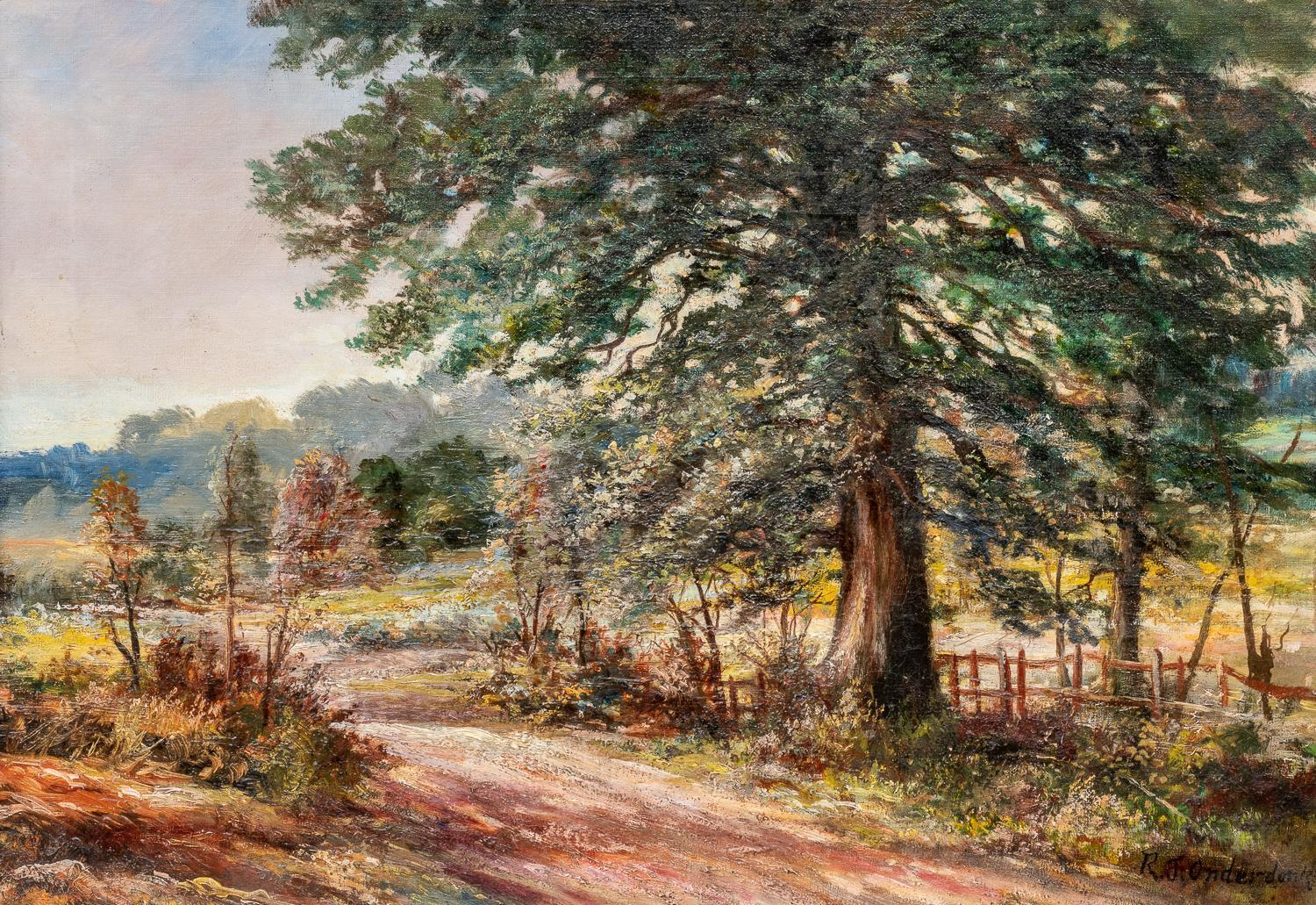
Early Texas Landscape, oil on canvas, private collection.

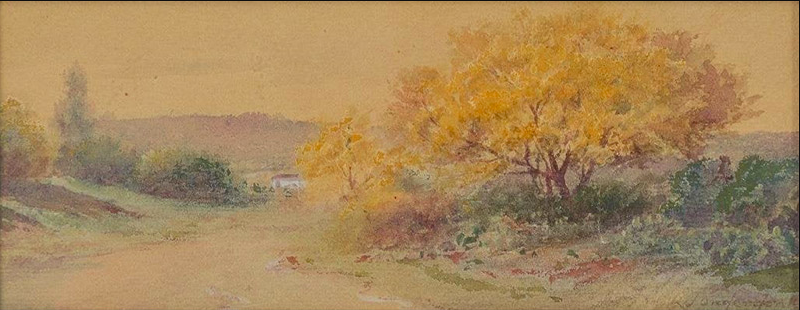
Landscape, watercolor on paper, private collection.

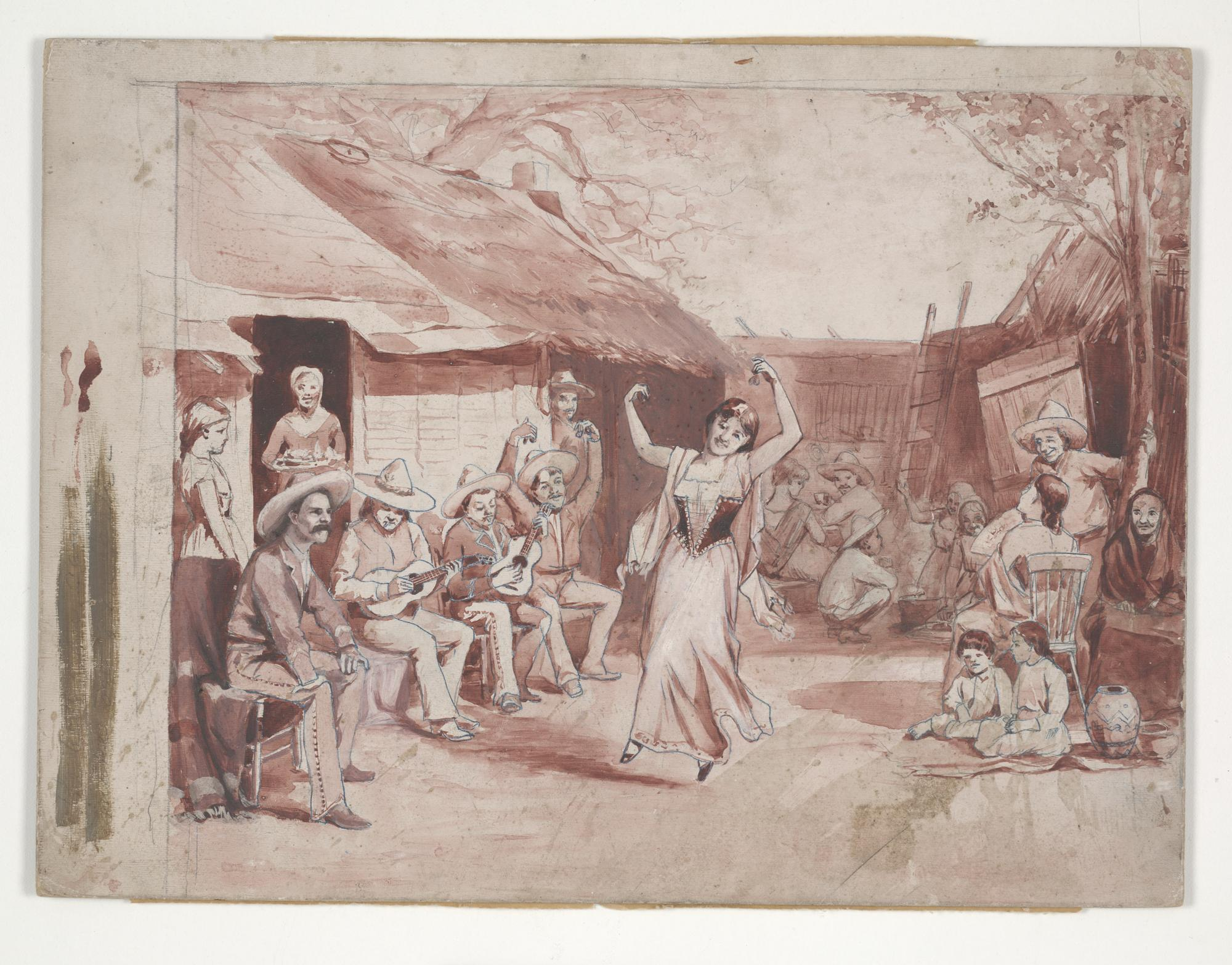
Fandango, watercolor, 1881, Dallas Museum of Art.

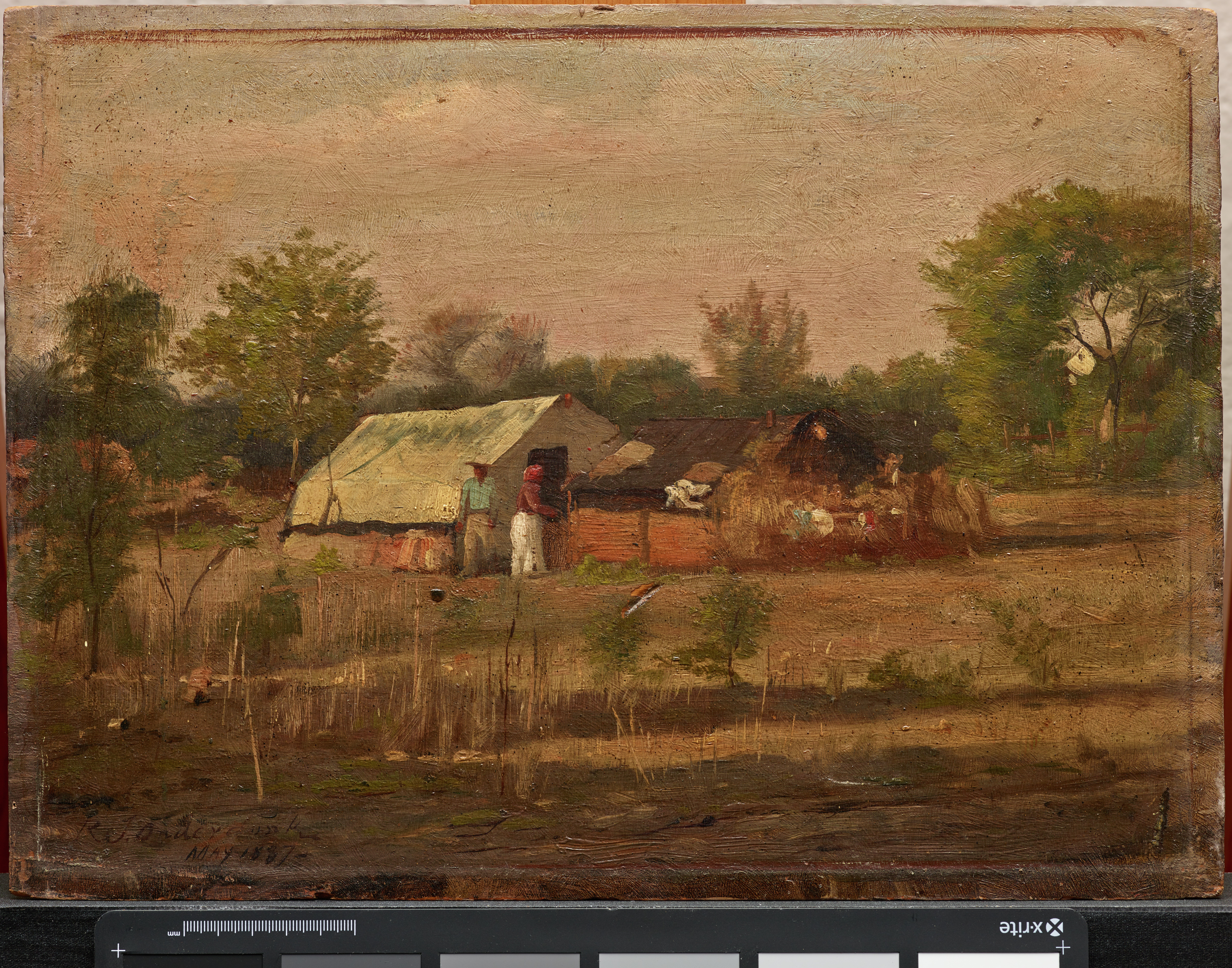
Mexican Jacal, oil on panel, 1887, Dallas Museum of Art.

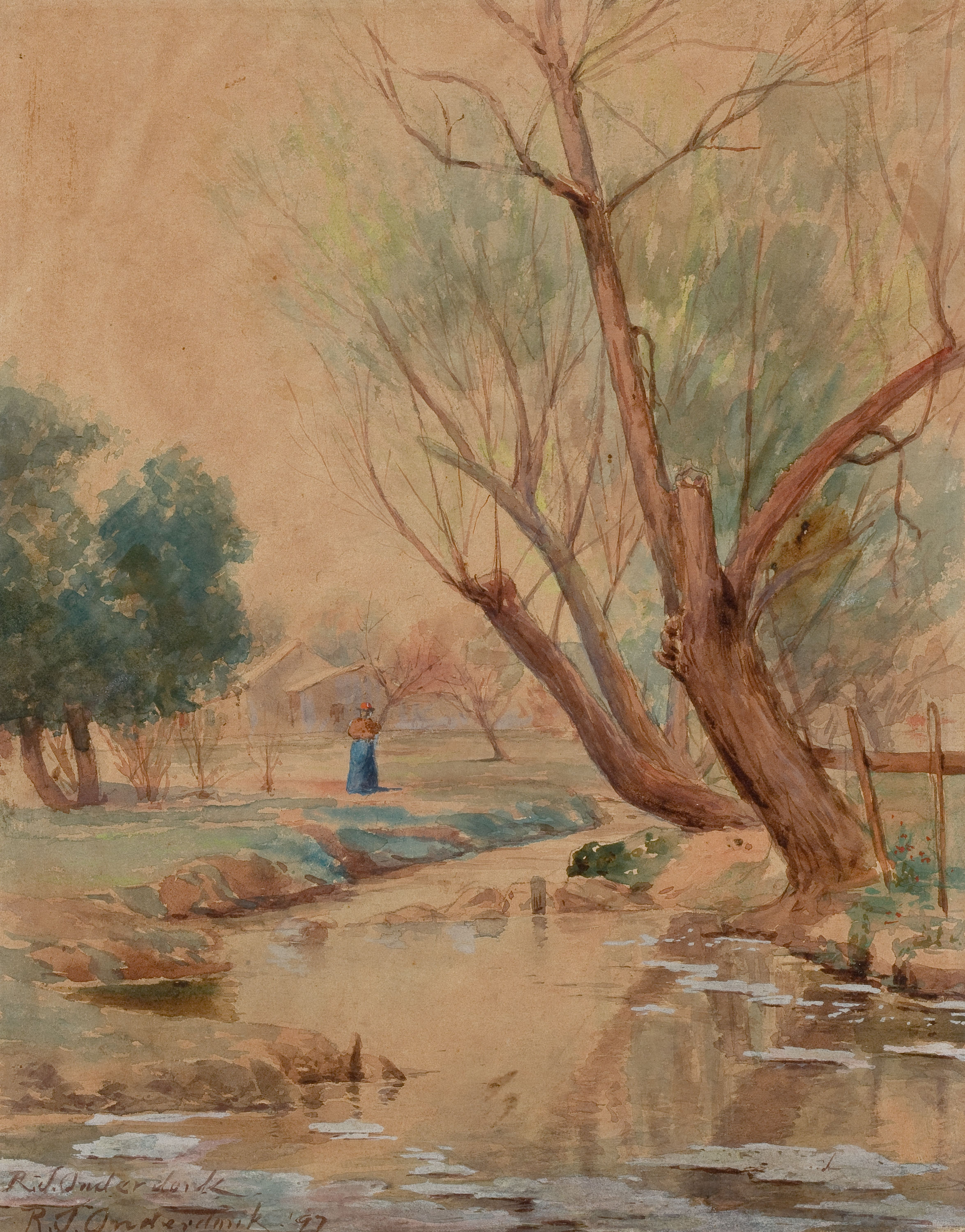
Landscape with Figure and Stream, watercolor on paper, 1897, private collection.

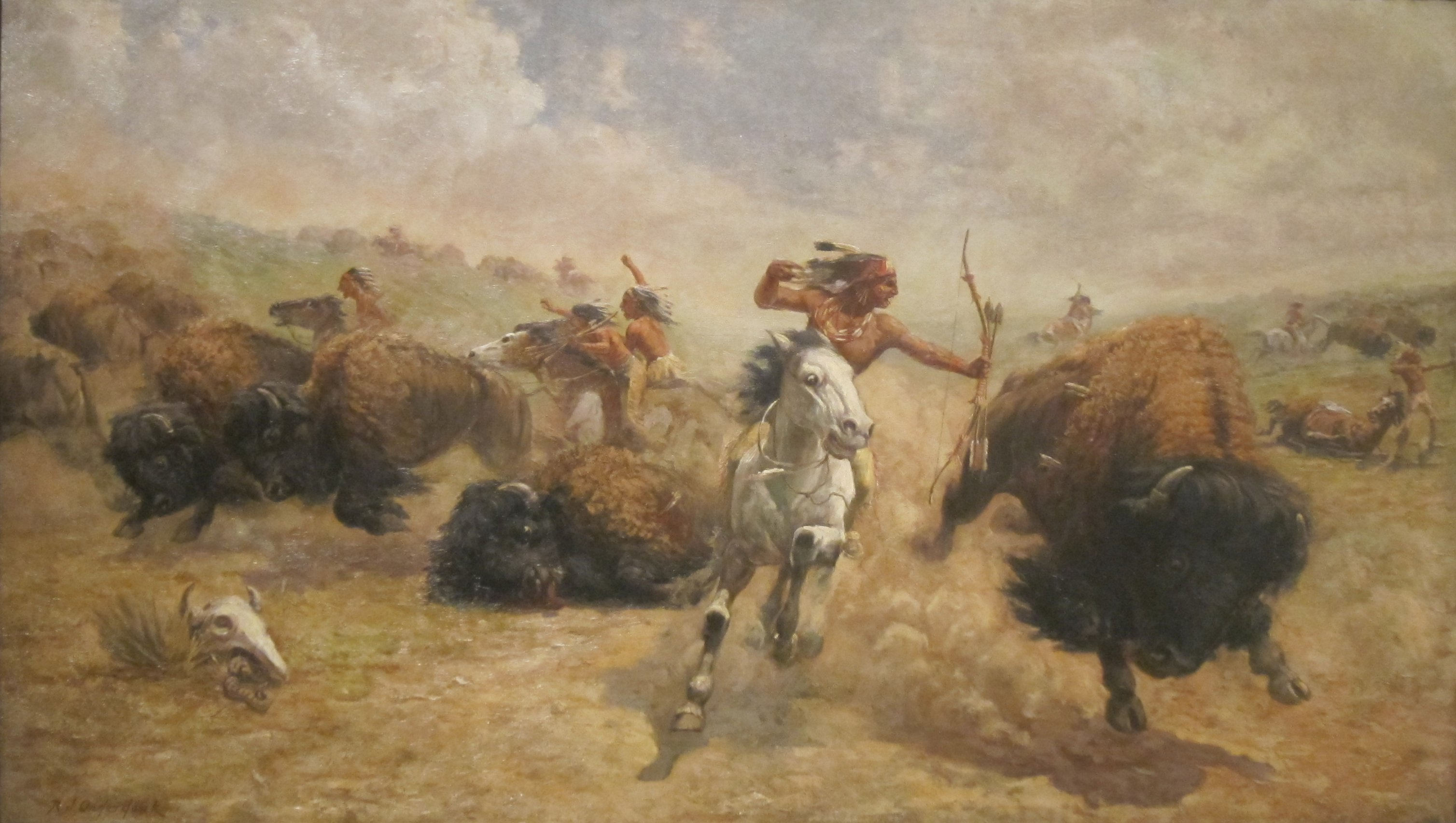
Buffalo Hunt, oil on canvas, 1898, El Paso Museum of Art.

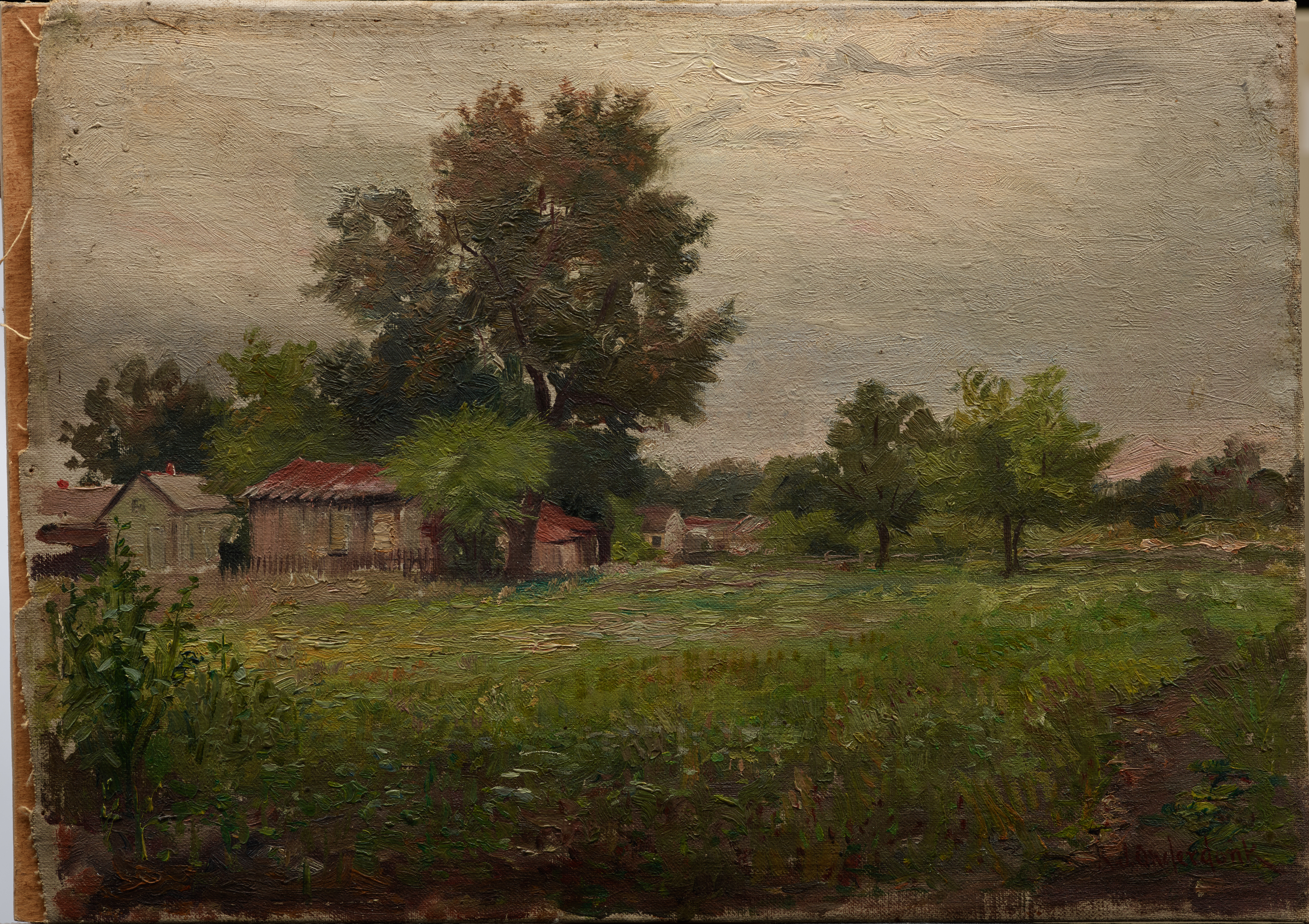
Farm Near Kerrville, oil on canvas, 1901, Dallas Museum of Art.

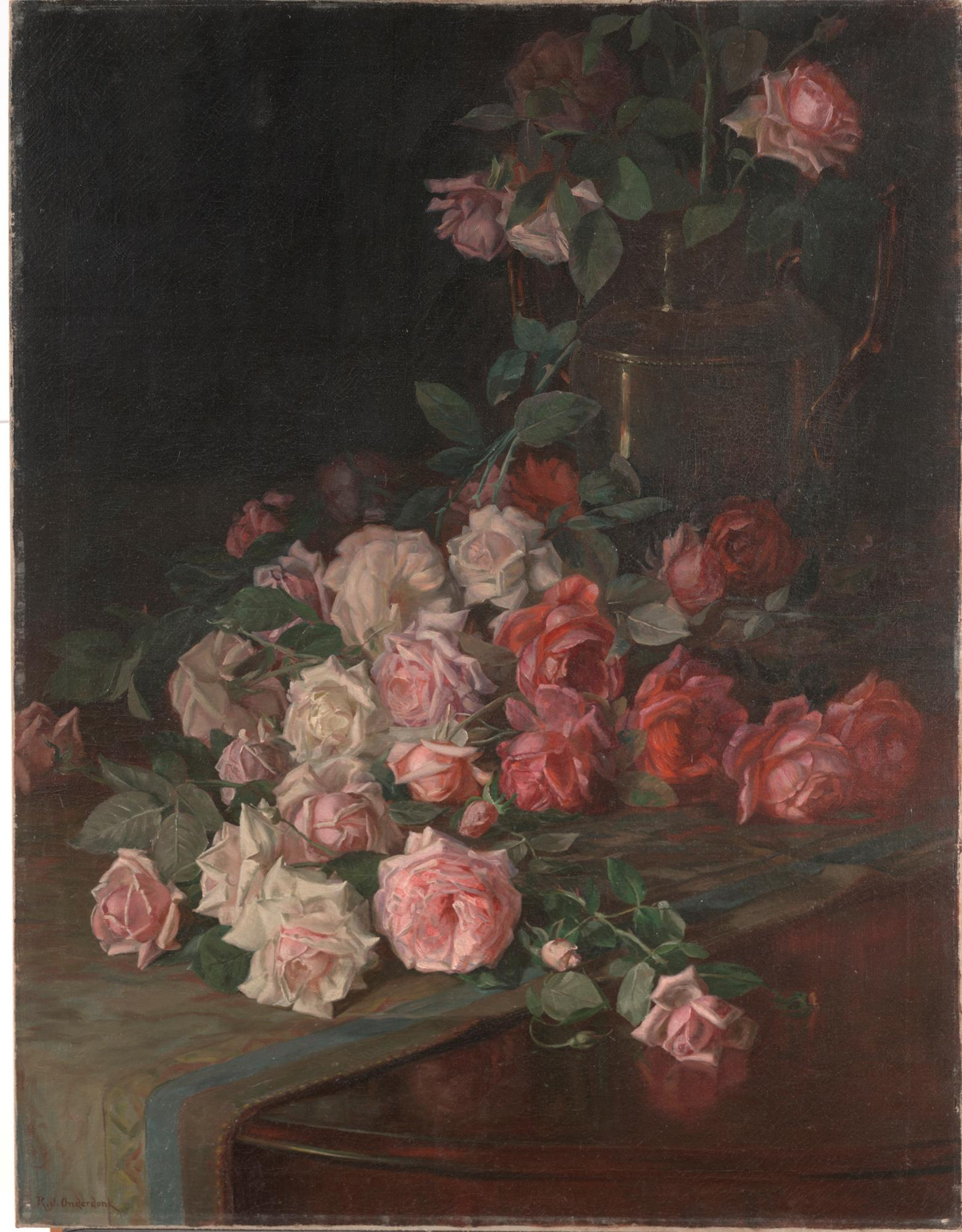
Roses and Mahogany, oil on canvas, ca.1900, Dallas Museum of Art.

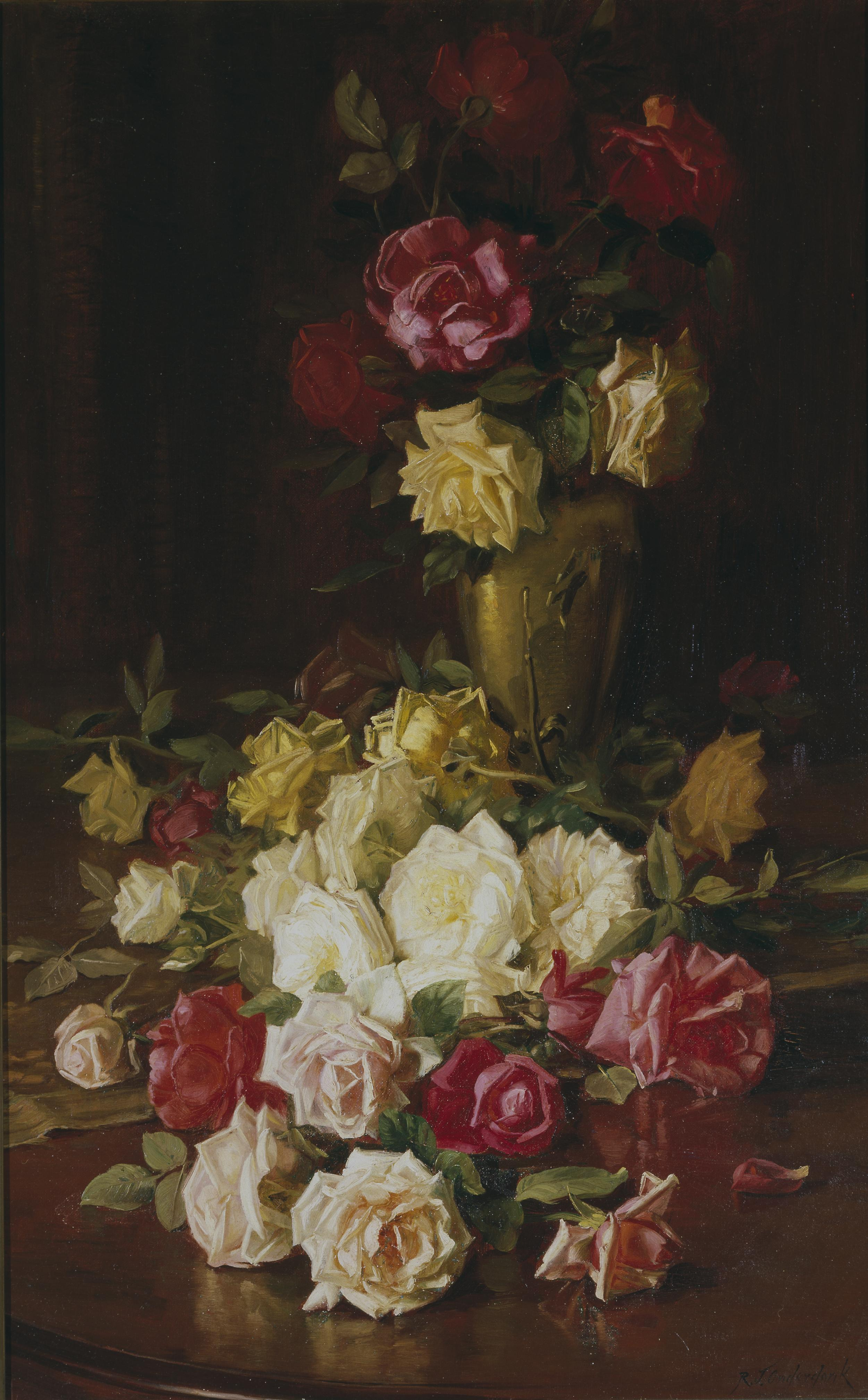
Untitled Roses, oil on canvas, ca. 1905-15, Dallas Museum of Art.

== Additional bibliography ==
- Diana Church, Guide to Dallas Artists, 1890-1917 (Plano, Texas, 1987)
- Esse Forrester-O'Brien, Art and Artists of Texas (Tardy, 1935)
- Cecilia Steinfieldt, The Onderdonks (San Antonio: Trinity University Press, 1976)
