= Federal Advisory Council =

The Federal advisory council or (FAC) is a body composed of representatives chosen by each of the twelve Federal Reserve Banks that "consults with and advises the Board on all matters within the Board's jurisdiction."

== Membership ==
- President - William Downe
- Vice President - Lyle R. Knight
- First District - Joseph L. Hooley
- Second District - James P. Gorman
- Third District - Bharat B. Masrani
- Fourth District - James E. Rohr
- Fifth District - Richard D. Fairbank
- Sixth District - Daryl G. Byrd
- Seventh District - David W. Nelms
- Eight District - Bryan Jordan
- Ninth District - Ken Karels
- Tenth District - Stanley A. Lybarger
- Eleventh District - Richard W. Evans, Jr.
- Twelfth District - J. Michael Shepherd
- Secretary - James E. Annable
