= Stifel =

American investment bank

Stifel Financial Corp.

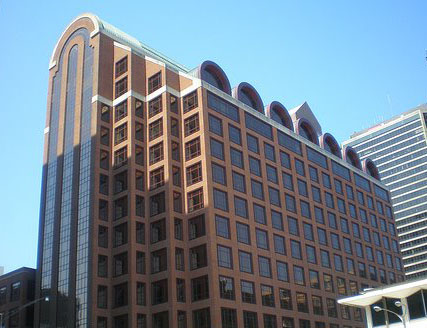
- Headquarters in St. Louis, Missouri
- Type: Public
- Traded as: NYSE: SF; S&P 400 component
- ISIN: US8606301021
- Industry: Investment services
- Founded: 1890; 136 years ago
- Headquarters: St. Louis, Missouri, US
- Key people: Ronald J. Kruszewski (chairman of the board, president, and CEO)
- Products: Asset management; Financial services; Investment banking; Investment management
- Revenue: ▲US$6.35 billion (2025)
- Net income: ▼US$684 million (2025)
- AUM: ▲US$436 billion (2021)
- Total assets: ▲US$41.3 billion (2025)
- Total equity: ▲US$5.98 billion (2025)
- Number of employees: c. 9,000 (2023)
- Website: stifel.com

Stifel Financial Corp. is an American multinational independent investment bank and financial services company created under the Stifel name in July 1983 and listed on the New York Stock Exchange on November 24, 1986. Its predecessor company was founded in 1890 as the Altheimer and Rawlings Investment Company and is headquartered in downtown St. Louis, Missouri.

Stifel offers securities-related financial services in the United States and Europe through several wholly owned subsidiaries. Its clients are served through Stifel, Nicolaus & Company, Incorporated (Stifel Nicolaus) in the U.S., a full-service retail and institutional brokerage and investment banking firm, through Stifel Nicolaus Canada Inc. in Canada, and through Stifel Nicolaus Europe Limited (SNEL) in the United Kingdom and Europe. Its other subsidiaries include Thomas Weisel Partners LLC (TWP), Stifel Independent Advisors, an independent contractor broker-dealer firm, and Stifel Bank & Trust, a retail and commercial bank. Stifel Bank & Trust offers consumer and commercial lending. Stifel Trust Company, N.A. offers trust and related services.

== Acquisition history ==
On December 1, 2005, Stifel Financial closed on the acquisition of the Legg Mason Capital Markets business (LM Capital Markets) from Citigroup Inc. The LM Capital Markets business acquired included investment banking, equity and fixed income research, equity sales and trading, and taxable fixed income sales and trading (22 offices in the US and Europe and 500 associates). These assets gave the company substantial research and capital market capabilities and transformed the company from a regional firm to a national one. In 2006, the company acquired the Private Client Group of Minneapolis-based Miller Johnson Steichen Kinnard, Inc. (MJSK) (7 offices and 50 financial advisors).

In 2007, the company completed the acquisition of Ryan Beck & Co. from BankAtlantic Bancorp (43 offices in 14 states and 1,100 associates). The acquisition significantly increased the company's presence on the East coast. The firm also opened several Private Client Group offices in the state of California and branched out across the entire West Coast. During the same year, the company completed the acquisition of First Service Financial Company, and its wholly owned subsidiary, FirstService Bank, a St. Louis-headquartered, Missouri chartered bank. As a result of the transaction, the company became a bank holding company and a financial holding company.

In 2008, the company completed its $12 million acquisition of Butler Wick & Company, Inc. from United Community Financial Corp. Butler Wick, a Youngstown, Ohio-based provider of financial advisory services, had offices in Ohio, Pennsylvania and New York (23 offices in three states and 175 associates). In 2009, the company acquired 56 branches from the UBS Wealth Management Americas (UBS) branch network (56 offices in 24 states and 500 associates). In 2010, the company completed its acquisition of Thomas Weisel Partners Group, Inc and created an enterprise with one of the largest U.S. equity research platforms and expanded institution equity business both domestically and internationally.

In 2011, the company announced an agreement to acquire Stone & Youngberg LLC, a financial firm specializing in municipal finance and fixed income securities. In 2012, the company and Keefe, Bruyette & Woods (KBW) announced a strategic merger. During the same year, the company expanded its investment banking capabilities and restructuring advisory expertise by acquiring Miller Buckfire. In 2014, the company acquired the London stockbroker Oriel Securities.

In June 2015, the company announced it would acquire Barclays US wealth and investment management unit for an undisclosed fee. In May 2015, the company acquired the debt capital markets and convertibles specialist ISM Capital LLP. In 2015, the company acquired the Birmingham, Alabama based investment bank, brokerage and wealth management firm Sterne Agee Group for $150 million. The following year, Stifel sold Sterne Agee to INTL FCStone Inc. (now StoneX Group Inc.).

In January 2016, the company acquired the placement agent Eaton Partners LLC. In 2018, the company acquired Business Bancshares, Inc. and its subsidiary, The Business Bank of St. Louis. The company also launched its venture banking and lending business, which was significantly expanded in 2023 following the disruption in the U.S. banking market.

In March 2018, the company acquired Ziegler Wealth Management. In November 2018, the group acquired German bank MainFirst Bank AG. In 2019, the company acquired First Empire Holding Corp. and its subsidiaries, including First Empire Securities Inc. In November 2021, the company acquired the Memphis, Tennessee, fixed income brokerage Vining Sparks.

== Current business ==
As of 2019, Stifel Financial Corp. employed over 7,500 associates in over 400 global locations. The CEO is Ronald J. Kruszewski. The company maintains corporate headquarters in St. Louis, Missouri, with capital markets headquarters in Baltimore, Maryland and London, England.

=== Commercial banking ===
Stifel provides commercial banking and debt capital financing to venture capital-backed technology companies and their investors. Following the disruption in the U.S. venture banking market in 2023, Stifel expanded its banking operations to serve venture-backed companies and venture capital firms seeking traditional banking services. These expanded activities include providing operating accounts, treasury management, and lending solutions tailored to early‑ and growth‑stage companies, as well as banking services designed to support venture capital funds.

Stifel's venture banking activities are integrated with the firm's capital markets and advisory capabilities, allowing clients to access banking services alongside equity research, investment banking, and wealth management offerings. The expansion positioned Stifel as a provider of banking services to the venture ecosystem during a period of reduced capacity among specialized venture banks.

=== Investment banking research ===
Stifel provides both equity and fixed income research. It is the largest provider of US equity research.

=== Global wealth management ===
Stifel employs more than 2,000 financial advisors in 300 locations. They have $19.672 billion in assets at Stifel Bank & Trust and $11.96 billion at Stifel Bank.

== Major locations ==
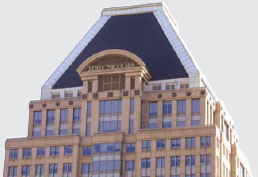
Stifel capital markets headquarters in Baltimore, Maryland

- St. Louis, Missouri, U.S., global headquarters
- Baltimore, Maryland, U.S., capital markets headquarters
- San Francisco, California, U.S.
- New York City, New York, U.S.
- Washington D.C., District of Columbia, U.S.
- London, United Kingdom, European markets headquarters

== Controversies ==
=== Securities and Exchange Commission lawsuit ===
The Securities and Exchange Commission sued Stifel Nicolaus on August 10, 2011, claiming the firm duped five Wisconsin school districts into buying $200 million in "unsuitable" securities tied to collateralized debt obligations. The investments, which the school districts had purchased in 2006 with $163 million in borrowed funds and $37 million of their own money, were "far more risky" than Stifel Nicolaus advertised to the school districts, the S.E.C. alleged, and the firm hid the risks “through a series of falsehoods and misrepresentations." The school districts' credit ratings were lowered and they lost their investments, which were intended to fund school employees' retirement benefits. Stifel Nicolaus said in a statement that it was “deeply disappointed by the misplaced action” and that it would “vigorously defend” its behavior in the transactions. The S.E.C. said the firm had claimed that the investments were so safe that it would take "15 Enrons" or some other unexpected catastrophe for the investments to fail, but the first increment of securities did badly and credit agencies issued a "negative watch" on part of the portfolio within days of its closing.

On March 19, 2012, it was announced that a settlement had been reached with the school districts to jointly pursue a $200 million lawsuit against Royal Bank of Canada, alleging that they are liable for the original misrepresentation. Royal Bank of Canada had already settled with the Securities and Exchange Commission in September 2011 for $30.4 million. In March 2012, Stifel settled with the school districts for $13 million. In 2016, the Wisconsin school districts secured a settlement with Stifel and RBC for $217.9 million, $63.9 million in cash and $154 million in debt forgiveness. Stifel and former senior vice president David Noack admitted negligence but not fraud. Stifel also agreed to pay a $22 million civil penalty and Noack agreed to pay a $100,000 penalty.

== See also ==
- List of investment banks
- Boutique investment bank
