= Permal Group =

Global investment management firm

The Permal Group
- Type: Private
- Industry: Investment management
- Founded: 1973; 53 years ago
- Headquarters: London, United Kingdom
- Products: Hedge funds, private equity funds
- AUM: $22 billion (2013)
- Website: www.permal.com

Permal Group is a British investment management firm specialized in hedge funds and private equity funds for international investors.

Permal was founded in 1973 and operates one of the oldest fund of hedge funds, and, as of 2013, manages approximately $22 billion in assets. Clients include sovereign wealth funds, pension funds, endowments, foundations, insurance companies, family offices, private banks, and high-net-worth individuals.

Its CEO is Omar Kodmani and its Chairman is Isaac R. Souede. Permal is headquartered in London, with offices in New York, Boston, Singapore, Paris, Nassau, Dubai, Hong Kong, and Beijing.

== History ==
The company was founded in 1973.

In 2005, Permal was acquired by Legg Mason in an $800 million transaction and operates as a subsidiary of that company.

In 2013, Permal acquired Fauchier Partners, a leading European based manager of funds of hedge funds, from BNP Paribas Investment Partners.

In 2016, the Permal Group subsidiary merged with EnTrust Capital to increase assets. After the merger the firm became EnTrustPermal, rebranding to EnTrust Global in 2019. In 2020 Gregg Hymowitz, the founder of EnTrust Capital, bought back Legg Mason's share of EnTrust Global, making it an independent private company.

== Investment funds ==
Permal offers a range of multi-manager, multi-strategy funds as well as single manager funds and customized separate accounts. The firm's flagship product, Permal Investment Holding, was launched in 1992 and is a global multi-strategy fund of hedge funds, managed by Robert Kaplan. The fund aims to capture two thirds of the upside during a bull market and seeks to limit its downside to one third of a comparable index during the bear market.

Permal also operates as a private equity fund of funds and secondary investment firm through its subsidiary, Permal Capital Management.

In 2016, Legg Mason merged its Permal Group subsidiary with EnTrust Capital to increase assets managed by its hedge funds-of-funds business to $26 billion. After the merge the company became known as EnTrustPermal, and later re-branded to EnTrust Global in 2019. In 2020, Gregg Hymowitz, founder of EnTrust Capital, bought back the Legg Mason share of EnTrust, creating EnTrust Global, a private, independent company.
