= Clubhouse model of psychosocial rehabilitation =

Community mental health service model

The Clubhouse model of psychosocial rehabilitation is a community mental health service model that helps people with a history of serious mental illness rejoin society and maintain their place in it; it builds on people's strengths and provides mutual support, along with professional staff support, for people to receive prevocational work training, educational opportunities, and social support. The model was created by Fountain House, one of the prime settings for what would, in the space of forty years, become the type specimen of the clubhouse model. Its validity is moderated and approved by Clubhouse International.

The model, which is non-residential, has its roots in a support group formed in 1943 inside Rockland Psychiatric Center in New York; when people were discharged they met in New York City, and eventually formalized their group in a house in Manhattan that was called "Fountain House". It was "the first psychiatric rehabilitation center of its kind in the United States." The group hired professional staff for the first time in 1955; together staff and members created a set of day programs that, along with the member-centered approach, became the model for other clubhouses.

There is an international clubhouse network, to which member clubs pay dues and which provides accreditation; standards were developed in 1989 and accreditation began in 1992.

== History ==
Fountain House was the first program of its kind. The model was spread across the US and eventually internationally starting in the 1950s, led largely by the National Council of Jewish Women. The model spread further with funding from the National Institute of Mental Health in 1977 for the National Clubhouse Training Program. In the mid-1990s New York City added "16 new clubhouses" that were funded, in part by "savings from the closing of several state mental hospitals into community programs."

== Model ==
Membership in a club is open to anyone with a serious mental illness, is voluntary, and never expires. In contrast to traditional day-treatment and other day program models, clubhouse participants are called "members" (as opposed to "patients" or "clients") and restorative activities focus on their strengths and abilities, not their illness. Clubhouses are community-based, and strive to help members join and remain part of society, with educational, prevocational, health, and mental health support. Members and staff work together to run structured day programs that follow the workday of the community where a given club is located. Programs are based on assumption that people have individual strengths that can be built on and that meaningful relationships and work are essential; members have the right to choose staff to work with and the kind of work they do.

Evening programs facilitate having a place to go after work hours. One such program collects people's of-the-moment writing, before they can edit and self-censor.

There is an international clubhouse network, to which member clubs pay dues and which provides accreditation; standards were developed in 1989 and accreditation began in 1992.

== Effectiveness ==
A review of research on the effectiveness of the clubhouse model in helping people found that evidence was limited by lack of randomized controlled trials, wide differences in the kinds of outcomes that were studied, and lack of long-term follow-up; these limitations make it difficult to generalize the results. Outcomes that have been measured include time to find full-time employment, earnings, and workplace integration; life satisfaction; psychiatric hospitalization; social integration; educational attainments; and physical health. It appears that clubhouse participation helps people avoid psychiatric hospitalization, improves quality of life, and may improve social integration. A 2016 review came to similar conclusions. A systematic review of the literature in 2018 found that the clubhouse model is a promising practice and calls for more rigorous studies.
