= Fountain House (nonprofit organization) =

Mental health nonprofit organization

Fountain House is a national mental health nonprofit organization focused on supporting people with serious and persistent mental illness. Founded in 1948, Fountain House originated the Clubhouse Model of Psychosocial Rehabilitation. The organization's stated mission is "to create the community, innovation, and social change needed for people most impacted by mental illness to lead connected and healthy lives."

The organization aims to address the isolation and social stigmatization faced by people with serious mental illness and provides assistance with housing, employment, education, community-building, and general wellness. Clubhouses work to foster interpersonal connection between members, facilitating social support for individuals experiencing serious mental illness.

The organization impacts over 100,000 people annually, has over 60,000 members, and has received the Conrad N. Hilton Humanitarian Prize.

== History ==
The origins of Fountain House can be traced back to 1943 at Rockland Psychiatric Center in Orangeburg, New York. While at Rockland, 10 patients formed a group that met in a "club room," where they shared their stories, read, painted, and socialized. This self-help group was created with the support of Dr. Hiram Johnson and volunteer Elizabeth Schermerhorn. By 1944, eight of the original members of this self-help group, as well as two former patients from other hospitals, created a formal name for the group, known as We Are Not Alone (WANA). WANA – which was created by and for people with serious mental illness – aimed to provide support to patients who were being discharged from hospitals back into their communities. The group gave practical assistance with finding employment and housing, and also provided opportunities to gain friendships and participate in recreational opportunities.

Fountain House was formally incorporated as a nonprofit organization in 1948 following the purchase of a brownstone building on 47th Street (Manhattan) in Manhattan, which served as a clubhouse for WANA. A fountain in the backyard patio inspired the name.

In 1955, a social worker from Michigan named John Beard was named Executive Director. Beard's pioneering philosophy emphasized mutually supportive relationships between members and staff, in the context of carrying out meaningful everyday tasks. The model was expanded across the US and eventually internationally starting in the 1950s, led largely by the National Council of Jewish Women. The model spread further with funding from the National Institute of Mental Health in 1977 for the National Clubhouse Training Program. In the mid-1990s New York City added 16 new clubhouses that were funded, in part by savings from the closing of several state mental hospitals into community programs.

In 1999, film maker Torstein Blixfjord directed a short performance piece to celebrate the 50th Anniversary of the Fountain House organisation in New York City. A block of the city was closed down, and portraits of Fountain House members by photographer Charlie Gross were projected onto buildings from windows. Saxophonists then descended from different fire escapes, each playing compositions by Briggan Krauss.

The type of community that was established at Fountain House, known as the Clubhouse Model, has been replicated more than 350 times in nearly 40 U.S. states and in 34 countries across the globe, serving more than 100,000 people annually. The global validity of the Clubhouse Model is moderated and approved by Clubhouse International.

In 2014, the Conrad N. Hilton Foundation honored the Fountain House organization with the Conrad N. Hilton Humanitarian Prize.
