= J.L.Stifel and Sons =

American textile and jeans manufacturing brand

J.L.Stifel & Sons was an American textile and jeans manufacturing brand which was prominent from 1835 to 1956 and a precursor in indigo-dyed cotton calicos. Smoother than canvas or denim but very resistant, calico earned success in work wear clothing. Typical JL Stifel calico motifs were polka dots, flowers and dotted lines on bandanas and ticking.

== Founding ==
Johann Stifel, the founder of J.L. Stifel Co., was born in Neuffen, Wurttemberg, Germany, on March 13, 1807. He learned the trade of dyer and calico printer, traveled throughout Europe as a journeyman and later as a foreman in Kaiserlautern. At the age 26, he emigrated to America. He landed in Baltimore in September 1833, then moved to Philadelphia and on the Bethlehem, Pa., where he worked in the woolen mills. In the summer of 1834, poor and alone, Johann Stifel walked from Bethlehem, Pa., to Wheeling. He traveled barefoot part of the time to save wear on his shoes. He became one of the first Germans to settle in Wheeling and in the winter of 1834-35 worked for his board on a local farm.

His North Main St. establishment had a short life because of his desire to return his trade of dyeing and printing of cloth. He purchased a bolt of unbleached cotton goods for $10, dyed and sold it, and purchased a new bolt. Thus he started to develop the capital for the factory which he opened at Ninth and Main Sts., where the Virginia Apartments now stand. Here he dyed and printed cloth by hand and peddled it from a wagon.

== Second generation ==
On June 18, 1835, he married Barbara Becht, a native German who was then residing in Steubenville. His life flourished and in 1859 his two sons, Louis C. and William F. Stifel, became partners in the growing firm. In 1896, the factory switched to mechanical methods of print.

J. L. Stifel retired in 1874 and died on December 1, 1881. He had developed a business that would prosper for many years. His plant had a daily capacity of many miles of cotton goods and employed several hundred people.

== Logo and 20th century ==
The brand logo, a boot ("stiefel" in German) with the word “stifel” inside, was adopted. J.L.Stifel & Sons was associated with quality and their products were exported to Latin America, the Philippines, India, Canada and Africa reaching its peak with a monthly production of 3.5 million yards of clothes.

The business was carried on by his heirs and moved to the 400 block on Main St. at the turn of the century.

During both World Wars, the plant converted to war production. In 1943, J. L. Stifel & Sons became the first in the textile industry to win the joint Army-Navy "E" Production Award.

== Closure ==
A declining demand for cotton goods, development of synthetic fibers and foreign imports resulted in the plant being closed in 1957.

== Legacy ==
J. L. Stifel had not only become a success through a trade learned in his youth but was involved in numerous business and civic ventures. He was a stockholder and director of the Wheeling Suspension Bridge; served as director and president of the Commercial Bank; was organizer and director of the National Savings Bank of Wheeling; and vice-president and director of the Benwood Iron Works.

He was founder of the first German paper in Wheeling, was a strong supporter of the Union and a member of the convention whose action brought about the separation of West Virginia from Virginia. He was also a member of the first board of Ohio County Commissioners.
