= St. Louis Regional Chamber =

The St. Louis Regional Chamber, formerly known as the St. Louis Regional Chamber and Growth Association (RCGA), is the chamber of commerce and primary economic development organization for The St. Louis Metropolitan Statistical Area.

The Chamber traces its early Roots back to 1836, making it one of the oldest chambers of commerce in the United States. Along the way, it has been involved with projects such as securing funding for Charles Lindbergh’s historic 1927 transatlantic flight (thus the naming of the Plane “The Spirit of St. Louis”) and rallying community support for the design, funding, and construction of St. Louis’ Gateway Arch.

By the late 1900s, There were three St. Louis area development related organizations: the Chamber of Commerce of Greater St. Louis; the St. Louis Regional Industrial Development Corp; and the St. Louis Research Council. In the early 1970s, these three groups merged and became the St. Louis Regional Commerce and Growth Association. In 2012, RCGA was rebranded and is now known as the St. Louis Regional Chamber. While the name of the organization has evolved over the years, its mission remains the same: to attract new jobs, help nurture and grow the businesses in the region and enhance the quality of life.

The St. Louis Regional Chamber is the region's largest business organization, representing the St. Louis business community across 15 counties in both Missouri and Illinois. With approximately 1,200 members, the mission of the organization is “to inspire a greater St. Louis”. It drives economic development and prepares people to meet 21st century global economic challenges by addressing emerging issues that impact economic development in the region.

The organization undertakes Regional economic development, it champions public policy to enhance the region's business climate, and cultivates the workforce to meet current and future market demands. Its activities include a proactive regional public policy agenda and marketing the St. Louis region nationally and internationally to develop, retain, expand, and attract businesses.

Fostering business development, the St. Louis Regional Chamber provides business programs and seminars; networking events; international business assistance; research; and informational resources. The organization further fosters economic development by recruiting new businesses to the region, helping existing companies expand and start-up companies weather their critical first years. The St. Louis Regional Chamber also advocates on behalf of the region at the local, state, and national levels.

The St. Louis Regional Chamber has three key strategies that align with the organization's vision of creating a regional economy that can compete on the world stage in the 21st century and are aimed at enhancing the region's economic competitiveness and quality of life.

== Key Strategic areas of the Chamber ==
1. Regional Economic Development – bring new jobs and companies to the St. Louis metropolitan area and help existing companies of all sizes grow
2. Regional Economic Opportunity – create new economic opportunities by leading initiatives to achieve greater education readiness, inclusion and talent attraction, and entrepreneurship and innovation
3. Advocate Forward Thinking Policy – address policy concerns that impact regional business
