= List of investment banks =

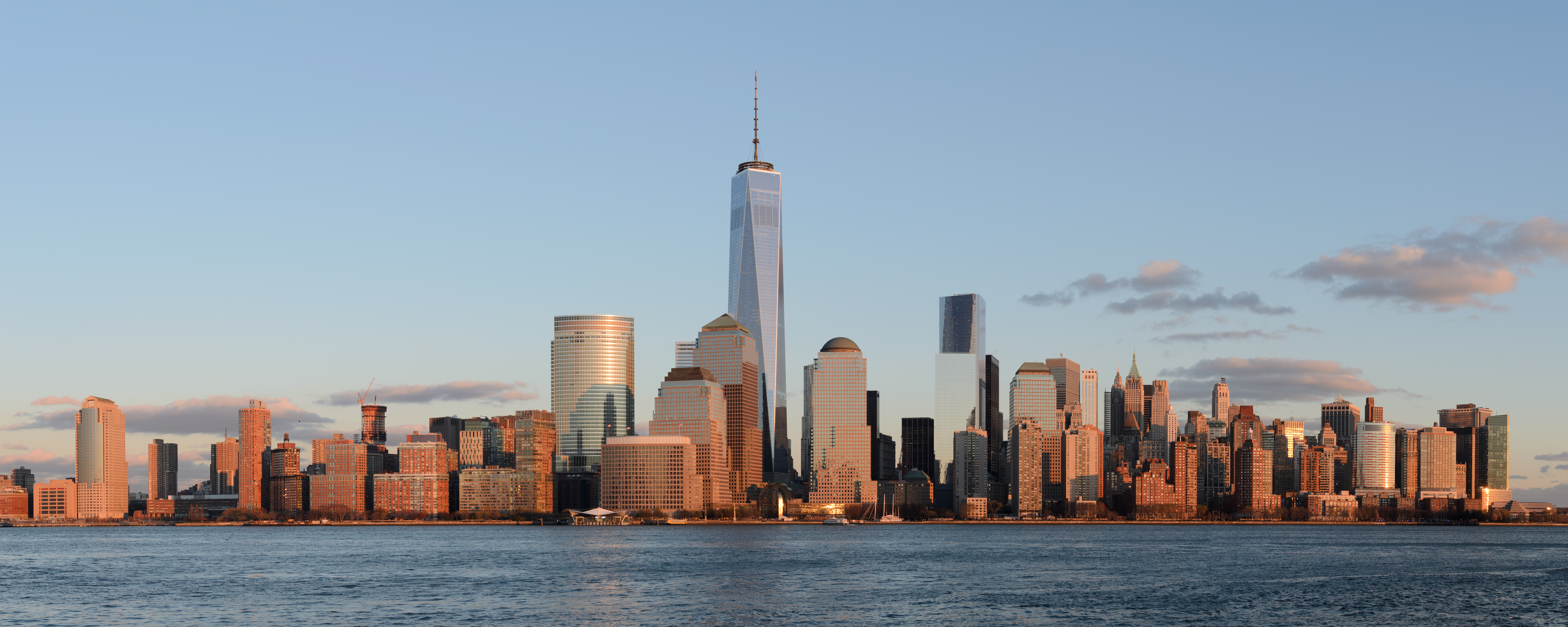
Most large investment banks maintain central offices in financial centers. Pictured: Lower Manhattan

The following list catalogues the largest, most profitable, and otherwise notable investment banks. This list of investment banks notes full-service banks, financial conglomerates, independent investment banks, private placement firms and notable acquired, merged, or bankrupt investment banks. As an industry it is broken up into the Bulge Bracket (upper tier), Middle Market (mid-level businesses), and boutique market (specialized businesses).

== Largest full-service investment banks ==
The following are the largest full-service global investment banks; full-service investment banks usually provide both advisory and financing banking services, as well as sales, market making, and research on a broad array of financial products, including equities, credit, rates, currency, commodities, and their derivatives. Based on data from London Stock Exchange Group, the largest investment banks by fees in 2024 are as follows:

1. (United States) JPMorgan Chase
2. (United States) Goldman Sachs
3. (United States) Bank of America
4. (United States) Morgan Stanley
5. (United States) Citigroup
6. (United Kingdom) Barclays
7. (United States) Wells Fargo
8. (France) BNP Paribas
9. (Germany) Deutsche Bank
10. (United States) Jefferies Group
11. (Canada) RBC Capital Markets
12. (Switzerland) UBS
13. (Japan) Mizuho Financial Group
14. (United Kingdom) HSBC
15. (Japan) Sumitomo Mitsui Financial Group
16. (Canada) TD Securities
17. (United States) Evercore
18. (United States) Lazard
19. (Canada) BMO Capital Markets
20. (United States) Centerview Partners
21. (France) Crédit Agricole Corporate and Investment Bank
22. (China) CITIC Group
23. (Japan) Mitsubishi UFJ Financial Group
24. (Spain) Santander Corporate & Investment Banking
25. (Japan) Nomura

Many of the largest investment banks are considered among the "bulge bracket banks" and as such underwrite the majority of financial transactions in the world. Additionally, banks seeking more deal flow with smaller-sized deals with comparable profitability are known as "middle market investment banks" (known as boutique or independent investment banks).

== Financial conglomerates ==
Large financial-services conglomerates combine commercial banking, investment banking, and sometimes insurance. Such combinations were common in Europe but illegal in the United States prior to the passage of the Gramm-Leach-Bliley Act of 1999. The following are large investment banking firms (not listed above) that are affiliated with large financial institutions:

- (Netherlands) ABN AMRO
- (Italy) Banca Monte dei Paschi di Siena (MPS Capital Services)
- (Brazil) Banco Bradesco
- (Spain) Banco Santander
- Bank of China (BOC International Holdings)
- (China) Bank of Communications (BOCOM International Holdings)
- (Spain) BBVA
- (Germany) Berenberg Bank
- (Canada) Canadian Imperial Bank of Commerce (CIBC World Markets)
- China CITIC Bank
- China Construction Bank (CCB International Holdings)
- (Malaysia) CIMB
- (Germany) Commerzbank
- (France) Crédit Agricole
- (Japan) Daiwa Securities
- (Singapore) DBS Bank (Capital Markets Group)
- (Canada) Desjardins Group (Desjardins Capital Markets)
- (Sweden) Handelsbanken
- (India) ICICI Bank
- Industrial and Commercial Bank of China (ICBC International Holdings)
- (Netherlands) ING Group
- (Italy) Intesa Sanpaolo (Banca IMI)
- (Turkey) İş Bankası (Is Investment)
- (Brazil) Itaú Unibanco (Itaú BBA)
- (Brazil) BTG Pactual
- (Belgium) KBC Bank
- (United States) KeyCorp (KeyBanc Capital Markets)
- (India) Kotak Mahindra Bank
- Laurentian Bank of Canada (Laurentian Bank Securities)
- (United Kingdom) Lloyds Banking Group (Lloyds Bank Wholesale Banking & Markets)
- (United States) M&T Bank
- (Australia) Macquarie Group
- (Malaysia) Maybank
- (Italy) Mediobanca
- (Japan) Mizuho Financial Group
- National Bank of Canada (National Bank Financial Markets)
- (France) Natixis
- (Finland) Nordea
- (United States) PNC Financial Services (Harris Williams & Company)
- (Netherlands) Rabobank
- (Malaysia) RHB Bank
- (United Kingdom) / (France) Rothschild & Co
- (South Africa) Sanlam
- (Russia) Sberbank
- (Canada) Scotiabank (Scotia Capital)
- (Sweden) SEB
- (France) Société Générale
- (South Africa) Standard Bank
- (United Kingdom) Standard Chartered Bank
- State Bank of India (SBI Capital Markets)
- (United States) Stifel Financial (Stifel Nicolaus)
- (Japan) Sumitomo Mitsui Financial Group
- (United States) SunTrust (Robinson Humphrey)
- (Canada) TD Securities
- (United States) Truist Financial
- (Italy) UniCredit (UBM)
- (Russia) VTB Bank (VTB Capital)

== Private placement companies ==
Private placement agents, including companies that specialize in fundraising for private equity funds:

- (United Kingdom) Asante Capital
- (United Kingdom) Campbell Lutyens
- (United States) Probitas Partners
- (United Kingdom) Rede Partners

== Other notable advisory and capital markets firms ==
The following is a list of other boutique advisory firms and capital markets firms that have some notability:

- (Belgium) BDO International (BDO Capital Advisors)
- (United States) Berkery, Noyes & Co
- (United Kingdom) RBC Brewin Dolphin
- (United States) Capital One (Capital One Securities)
- (United Kingdom) Deloitte (Deloitte Corporate Finance)
- (United States) Duff & Phelps
- (United Kingdom) Ernst & Young (Ernst & Young Capital Advisors)
- (Netherlands) KPMG (KPMG Corporate Finance)
- (United Kingdom) PwC (PwC Corporate Finance)
- (United States) Roth MKM

== Notable former investment banks and brokerages ==
The following are notable investment banking and brokerage firms that have been liquidated, acquired or merged and no longer operate under the same name.

Firm	Fate
A.G. Becker & Co.	acquired by Merrill in 1984
A.G. Edwards	acquired by Wachovia in 2007
Alex. Brown & Sons	ultimately part of Deutsche Bank, survives as minor business unit
The Argosy Group	acquired by Canadian Imperial Bank of Commerce in 1995
Babcock & Brown	collapsed 2009, liquidation of its assets
BancAmerica Robertson Stephens	acquired by NationsBank in 1998 and integrated into NationsBanc Montgomery Securities to form Banc of America Securities
Barings	collapsed 1995; assets acquired by ING Bank
Bear Stearns	collapsed 2008; assets acquired by JPMorgan Chase
Blyth, Eastman Dillon & Co.	merged with Paine Webber in 1979
Bowles Hollowell Connor & Co.	acquired by First Union in 1998
Brown Bros. & Co.	merged with Harriman Brothers & Company in 1931 to form Brown Brothers Harriman & Co.
BT Alex. Brown	acquired by Deutsche Bank in 1999 to form Deutsche Bank Alex. Brown
C.E. Unterberg, Towbin	acquired by Collins Stewart in 2007
Commodities Corporation	acquired by Goldman Sachs in 1997 and renamed Goldman Sachs Princeton
Dain Rauscher Wessels	bought by Royal Bank of Canada in 2000
Dean Witter Reynolds	merged with Morgan Stanley to form Morgan Stanley Dean Witter, subsequently the Dean Witter name was eliminated
Dillon, Read & Company	acquired by Swiss Bank Corporation in 1997, and is ultimately part of UBS AG
Donaldson, Lufkin & Jenrette	acquired by Credit Suisse in 2001
Drexel Burnham Lambert	liquidated 1990
E.F. Hutton & Co.	acquired by Shearson Lehman/American Express in 1988, ultimately part of Lehman Brothers
First Boston Corporation	merged with Credit Suisse in 1988 to form CS First Boston, renamed "Credit Suisse First Boston" in 1996 and "Credit Suisse" in 2006
First Union Securities	acquired by Wachovia in 2002 to form Wachovia Securities
G.H. Walker & Co.	acquired by White Weld & Co in 1974 and ultimately part of Merrill Lynch
Giuliani Capital Advisors	the investment banking division of Giuliani Partners was sold to Macquarie Group in 2007
Goodbody & Co.	acquired by Merrill in 1970
Gruntal & Co.	acquired by Ryan Beck & Co. in 2002
H.B. Hollins & Co.	liquidated in 1913
Halsey, Stuart & Co.	ultimately part of Wachovia
Hambrecht & Quist	acquired by Chase Manhattan Bank in 1999 and ultimately part of JPMorgan Chase; H&Q name continues as investment advisor
Hambros Bank	acquired by Société Générale in 1998
Harriman Brothers & Company	merged with Brown Bros. & Co. in 1931 to form Brown Brothers Harriman & Co.
Hayden, Stone & Co.	acquired Shearson Hammill & Co. in 1974 and assumed the Shearson name; ultimately acquired by American Express in 1981.
HBOS	acquired by Lloyds TSB to form the Lloyds Banking Group in 2009
Hill Samuel	acquired by Trustee Savings Bank (TSB) in 1987 later Lloyds TSB
Hornblower & Weeks	investment bank acquired by Loeb, Rhoades & Co. in 1977 and ultimately part of Shearson/American Express
J.&W. Seligman & Co.	investment bank ultimately part of UBS AG; continues as asset manager
J.C. Bradford & Co.	acquired by PaineWebber in 2000, ultimately part of UBS AG
John Nuveen & Co.	IBD acquired by Piper Jaffray in 1999; company continues as asset management house under Nuveen Investments, which is controlled by private equity firm Madison Dearborn Partners
Kaufman Bros.	Ceased operations in 2012
Keefe, Bruyette & Woods	acquired by Stifel in 2012, still maintain independent branding
Kidder, Peabody & Co.	acquired by General Electric Corporation in 1986, subsequently resold to PaineWebber in 1994 and ultimately part of UBS AG
Kleinwort Benson	acquired by Dresdner Bank in 1995
Kuhn, Loeb & Co.	ultimately part of Lehman Brothers
L.F. Rothschild	ultimately part of C.E. Unterberg, Towbin, with parts sold to Oppenheimer; not to be confused with Rothschild & Co (the result of a merger of the British N.M. Rothschild & Sons with the French Rothschild & Cie); see Rothschild family
Lee, Higginson & Co.	liquidated 1932
Lehman Brothers	bankrupt in 2008, asset sold to Barclays Capital and Nomura Holdings
Llama Company	ultimately defunct in 1998 after departure of Alice Walton
Loeb, Rhoades & Co.	acquired by Shearson Hammill & Co. to form Shearson Loeb Rhoades in 1979 which was later acquired by American Express in 1981 to form Shearson/American Express
Mendelssohn & Co.	aryanized by the Nazis in 1938, sold in parts to Deutsche Bank
Merrill	acquired by Bank of America in 2008 and integrated into Banc of America Securities
Miller Buckfire & Co.	acquired by Stifel in 2012, still maintains independent branding
Montgomery Securities	acquired by NationsBank in 1997 and integrated into NationsBanc Capital Markets to form NationsBanc Montgomery Securities
Morgan & Cie	acquired by Morgan Stanley in 1967 and incorporated as Morgan et Compagnie International in Morgan Stanley International Incorporated in 1975
Monnet, Murnane & Co.	liquidated 1945
Morgan Grenfell	acquired by Deutsche Bank in 1990
Morgan, Harjes & Co.	renamed Morgan & Cie in 1926 and acquired by Morgan Stanley in 1926
Paine Webber	acquired by UBS AG in 2000.
Park Ryan	liquidated 1979
Prudential Securities	acquired by Wachovia in 2003
Reynolds Securities	merged with Dean Witter & Co. in 1978 to form Dean Witter Reynolds, subsequently merged with Morgan Stanley
Robert Fleming & Co.	acquired by JPMorgan Chase in 2000.
Robertson Stephens	acquired by BankAmerica in 1997 and integrated into BancAmerica Securities to form BancAmerica Robertson Stephens. Sold again in 1998 to BankBoston (later FleetBoston Financial and would operate as Robertson Stephens from 1998–2002, when the firm was shuttered after the collapse of the Internet bubble
Roosevelt & Son	Broken up into three firms in 1934: Roosevelt & Son (liquidated), Roosevelt & Weigold (today operates as Roosevelt & Cross); and Dick & Merle Smith
Ryan Beck & Co.	acquired by Stifel in 2007
S. G. Warburg & Co	ultimately part of UBS AG; not to be confused with M.M. Warburg or Warburg Pincus; see Warburg family
Salomon Brothers	acquired by Travelers Group in 1997, ultimately part of Citigroup
Schroders	investment bank bought by Citigroup in 2000; continues as asset manager
Shearson/American Express	acquired Lehman Brothers Kuhn Loeb in 1984 to form Shearson Lehman/American Express, later Shearson Lehman Hutton and Shearson Lehman Brothers
Shearson, Hammill & Co.	renamed Shearson Loeb Rhoades after the 1979 acquisition of Loeb, Rhoades & Co. in 1979; acquired by American Express in 1981 to form Shearson/American Express
Shearson Lehman Hutton	renamed Shearson Lehman Brothers in 1990 and split up in 1993 with the IPO of Lehman Brothers and the sale of the retail and brokerage operations to Primerica
Soundview Technology Group	Acquired by Charles Schwab in 2003.
Swiss Bank Corporation	merged with Union Bank of Switzerland to form UBS AG
Union Bank of Switzerland	merged with Swiss Bank Corporation to form UBS AG
Wachovia Securities	acquired by Wells Fargo in 2008 and renamed Wells Fargo Securities
Wasserstein Perella & Co.	acquired by Dresdner Bank in 2000.
Wertheim & Co.	acquired by Schroders, and ultimately by Salomon Smith Barney
White Weld & Co.	acquired by Merrill in 1978.
Wood Gundy	acquired by the Canadian Imperial Bank of Commerce in 1987, operating as CIBC Wood Gundy before becoming CIBC World Markets in 1997

== See also ==
- List of private-equity firms
- List of investment banking private equity groups
- List of asset management firms
- Sovereign wealth fund
- List of exchange-traded funds
- Bulge bracket
- Boutique investment bank
