= Rede Partners =

British independent private equity fundraising advisory firm

- Company type: Private Company
- Industry: Financial services, Private placement agent
- Headquarters: London, W1; United Kingdom
- Key people: Scott Church (Founder); Adam Turtle (Founder)
- Services: Fund placement
- Number of employees: 70
- Website: www.rede-partners.com

Rede Partners is an independent private equity fundraising advisory firm focused on primary fundraising, secondaries, strategic advisory projects and investor relations advisory. The firm has offices in London, Hong Kong and New York with a team of over 100 professionals. Rede Partners was founded in 2011 by Scott Church and Adam Turtle. Scott's career began at Merrill Lynch where he remained for sixteen years, ending it as a managing director within the private equity group (placement). He moved to Lazard where he was a managing director in the private funds group. Adam, previously a Director within the investor relations group at private equity firm Actis, began his career with Credit Suisse's private fund placement group. Kristina Widegren joined the partnership in 2019 and was followed by Alexandra Bazareweski, Magnus Goodlad and Bruce Weir in 2020.

== Business Lines ==
Rede Partners operates four lines of business:

- Fund placement for private equity fund managers, acting as the placement agent. Rede Partners assists private equity firms in fund raising and advises on all the stages and areas of the fundraising process including strategy, documentation and structuring. The firm works closely with investors to fully understand their programme and then takes a thoughtful approach to introducing relevant opportunities. Recently, Rede has completed fundraising for private equity firms including Alchemy, Ambienta, AnaCap Financial Partners, Apax France, Hg, PAI Partners, Paragon Partners, Stirling Square Capital Partners, Summa Equity, TCV, Thomas H.Lee Partners, Valedo Partners, Verdane Capital.
- Strategic advisory services for General Partners of private equity funds including advising on strategic assessment, fund positioning, fund structuring, investor cartography and market testing. Restructuring and secondary advisory are additional lines for private equity funds.
- Investor Relations advisory for General Partners of private equity funds including investor development, press releases, investor reporting, AGM preparation and co-investments.
- Secondaries advisory services focused on GP-led transactions including liquidity solutions, direct portfolio transactions, fund restructuring, early secondaries and staple transactions.

== Competitors ==
Fundraising for private funds is supported by numerous firms. Notable competitors include Asante Capital, Campbell Lutyens, UBS, Probitas Partners and Credit Suisse.
