= Matt Kaufmann (disambiguation) =

Matt Kaufmann is an American research scientist based in Texas.

Matt Kaufmann, Matt Kaufman or Matthew Kauffman may refer to:

- Matt Kaufman (executive), American executive and the Chief Safety Officer at Roblox.
- Matthew Kaufman, British biologist
- Matthew King Kaufman, American record producer
- Matthew Kauffman, American journalist

== See also ==
- Kaufman (disambiguation)
