= Kaufman =

Kaufman or Kauffman may refer to:

== People ==
- Kaufmann (surname) (including variant spellings)

== Places ==
- Kaufman, Illinois, an unincorporated community in Madison Count
- Kaufman, Texas, a city in Kaufman County
  - Kaufman Lake, a lake in the city of Kaufman, Texas
- Kaufman County, Texas, located in the northeast area of the state
- Kauffman Stadium, a baseball stadium in Kansas City, Missouri
- Kauffman's Distillery Covered Bridge, in Lancaster County, Pennsylvania
- Mount Kauffman, a mountain in Antarctica

== Other ==
- Kaufmann's, a former department store chain
- Kaufman Bros., a former investment banking firm

== See also ==
- Ewing Marion Kauffman Foundation a nonprofit known as the Kauffman Foundation
  - Kauffman Fellows Program, established by the Kauffman Foundation
