= Castolin Eutectic =

- Type: Private
- Industry: Wear and Fusion Technology
- Genre: Corporate histories
- Founded: Lausanne, Switzerland
- Founder: Jean-Pierre Wasserman
- Number of locations: over 100 worldwide
- Area served: worldwide
- Products: welding, brazing, coating (consumables & equipment), wear plates
- Services: Castolin Services
- Number of employees: 2,000 worldwide
- Parent: Paragon Partners
- Subsidiaries: in over 100 countries

Castolin Eutectic was established in 1906 by Jean-Pierre Wasserman in Lausanne, Switzerland. He discovered a new method of low-temperature brazing of cast iron, which was a revolutionary process for the repair and wear-protection of metals. During the last decades fluxes, brazing alloys as well as coating and welding equipment and consumables have been developed and the company is present with its own subsidiaries in over 100 countries on all five continents.

== Paragon partners ==
Castolin Eutectic reinforced its position in 2020 with a new shareholder.

== Products ==
The 4 principal product areas are:

- Welding consumables and equipment
- Brazing consumables, fluxes and equipment
- Coating consumables and equipment
- Wear plates and engineered parts

== History ==
- 1906 Foundation of Castolin in Lausanne, Switzerland
- 1940 Foundation of Eutectic Welding Alloys Corporation in New York City
- 1959 Foundation of Eutectic Japan Ltd
- 1962 Foundation of Eutectic India Ltd - a joint venture with the company Larsen & Toubro, with products marketed under the name of L&T EWAC Alloys
- 1960's Start of first CastoLab workshops
- 1970's Development of Cored wire and production
- 1980's Development of world's first gas atomised powder production
- 1991 CDP® Wearplate development and production
- 1996 Creation of Global Industry Program
- 2005 Part of the Messer World.
- 2006 100 years anniversary
- 2007 Opening of the World's most advanced powder production facility and introduction of first NanoAlloy® welding consumable
- 2008 Castolin Services growth and acquisitions in the United Kingdom, Russia, United States, Canada, China, Austria, Norway, Hungary, Belgium.
- 2013 Acquisition of Monitor Coatings, technology leader for surface engineering in extreme environments with facilities in the UK, Singapore and China.
- 2014 Acquisition of Whertec, a privately owned company with headquarters in Jacksonville, Florida, USA. Over the past years Whertec has secured a leading position in the boiler coatings market covering the power, recycling, biomass, steel and pulp & paper industries.
- 2015 Geographical expansion by Joint Venture agreements in Nigeria and Saudi Arabia
- 2017 Acquisition of FMP Coatings. FMP specializes in inorganic-hybrid coatings.
- 2020 Paragon Partners acquired all shares in Castolin Eutectic.
