= Joseph Safina =

American racing driver

- Born: December 8, 1967 (age 58); Brooklyn, New York, U.S.
- Occupations: Racing driver, businessman, author
- Years active: 1987–present
- Notable work: 24 Hours of Daytona, Grand Am Rolex Sports Car Series, IMSA GT, 12 Hours of Sebring

Joseph Safina (born December 8, 1967) is an American race car driver and businessman. He began his racing career in 1990 and he has since competed in races such as the 24 Hours of Daytona, 12 Hours of Sebring and Dubai 24 Hour. Notable achievements include being on the VICI Racing team as they were the first to race a Lamborghini GTR at the 12 Hours of Sebring, as well as driving the Florida Marlins sponsored Porsche in the 2008 IMSA SportsCar Championship.

== Career ==
Safina began his investment banking career in 1988 by joining Gruntal & Co. where he was later named Senior Vice President. After leaving Gruntal & Co. in 1993 he founded Nichols, Safina, Lerner & Co. Inc. (NSL), where he served as CEO. Under his leadership, NSL grew into a 200 employee multi-location business that was involved in around a billion dollars in financing. His work with NSL was featured in R.J. Shook's book The Winner's Circle II. In 1997, he sold his interests in the company and became the CEO of Safina Asset Management now Safina Capital, a private equity investment firm. He was also involved in bringing Financial Carrier Services (FCS) into the Inc 5000 where Joseph worked as a founding partner of FCS with Derek Skea. Joseph was also notably involved in the founding of Loud Records helping the company to sell stock to Universal Music Group. He later became Vice Chairman of Trimedia Entertainment Group Inc., and an investor in Secured Health and Life. In 2013, he sold Secured Health and Life to Health Insurance Innovations. He has written three books.

== Racing career ==
Safina began racing cars professionally in 1997, first racing a 5.8L V8 Ford Mustang Cobra R in the IMSA Speedvision Cup. He has raced for six different manufacturers, those being Porsche, BMW, Saleen, Ferrari, Ford, and Lola. Safina has had a racing career with achievements such as being the first to race a Lamborghini GTR at the 12 Hours of Sebring. and racing the Miami Marlins sponsored GT3 in 2008, going top-ten three years in a row at the 24 Hours of Daytona. win in his Ferrari 360 Challenge in 2001 at Homestead–Miami Speedway.

Safina owns a body shop called Safina Performance that works on custom cars, such as a 2011 Ford F-450 4x4 King Ranch that was modified into an all-black custom vehicle. Safina also worked with prominent auto shop Mobsteel to create a resto-modded 1964 Lincoln Continental, with a 427ci CobraJet V8, forged 22-inch alloy wheels, 12inch disk brakes, and a custom interior and exterior.

== Publications ==
Safina is the author of three books:

- Driven: From Racing Tracks to Wall Street: One Man's Journey of Triumph, Loss, and Redemption (2019), a business memoir.
- Amici del Lago: Popular Italian Recipes & Home Cooked Meals For Family, Friends and Celebrations: A Cookbook (2021), a collection of essays inspired by automotive culture and personal growth.
- Deal Mode: Mastering the Art of Selling Your Company (2023), focused on negotiation and selling a business.
