= Asante Capital =

British private equity placement and advisory firm

Asante Capital Group
- Type: Private Ownership
- Industry: Private equity, Private Equity Secondaries, Venture Capital, Buyout, Growth Equity, Infrastructure
- Founded: 2010
- Founder: Warren Hibbert, Fraser van Rensburg
- Headquarters: London, England, UK
- Area served: Worldwide
- Products: Fund placement, Secondary Advisory, Research
- Number of employees: 60 (January 2021)
- Website: www.asantecapital.com

Asante Capital Group is a private equity advisory firm with offices in London, New York City, Hong Kong, and Munich. The firm is active across primary capital raising, secondaries advisory and direct investment transactions. Asante partners with fund managers globally and across the strategy spectrum including buyout, growth, venture, private debt, infrastructure and real assets. To date, Asante has assisted the placement of over 100 funds and transactions with more than 60 notable investment firms, including Welsh Carson Anderson & Stowe, Chequers Capital, Creandum, LLR Partners, Montagu Private Equity, One Equity Partners, Summit Partners, NIO Capital, Whitehorse Liquidity Partners, and others.

== History ==
Asante Capital Group was founded in 2010 by managing partners Warren Hibbert and Fraser van Rensburg; both had previously been partners at MVision.

== Business Verticals ==
Asante Capital Group is active across three verticals:

- Primary Capital Raising - fund placement for private equity fund managers, typically as the sole global placement agent advisor. Clients vary from less established managers to some of the oldest and most established multi-vertical investment platforms globally. As of 2021, Asante has raised over $40 billion for 70 funds across 45 fund managers.
- Secondaries Advisory - supporting both General Partners and Limited Partners with liquidity solutions. Types of deals include both GP-led and LP-led transactions and Asante has advised on multiple continuation vehicle fund restructurings, LP stake sales, tender processes, bridge funds and seasoned primaries. As of 2021, Asante has advised on over $5 billion worth of secondaries transactions.
- Direct Investment Transactions - partnering with fundless sponsors to finance investments on a deal-by-deal basis. This vertical provides creative capital raising and structuring solutions, as well as tailored advisory beyond the traditional fundraising remit. As of 2021, Asante has completed over $2.5 billion of direct transaction sales.

== Competitors ==
The placement agent landscape is a competitive environment, with many firms providing private equity advisory services to managers across the spectrum. A few placement agents are structured as groups within larger investment banking firms, though a number, like Asante, operate as independent advisors. Notable competitors include Campbell Luytens, Evercore, Lazard, Credit Suisse, PJT Partners, Rede Partners, and UBS.
