= Gruntal & Co. =

Financial services company

- Type: Acquired
- Industry: Financial services
- Predecessor: Sternberger & Fuld; Sternberger, Fuld & Sinn; Gruntal, Lilienthal & Co.
- Founded: 1880
- Defunct: 2002
- Fate: Acquired in 2002 by Ryan Beck & Co.
- Successor: Stifel Financial (after 2007 acquisition of Ryan Beck
- Headquarters: New York City, United States
- Key people: Benedict H. Gruntal, Morris Hartig, Albert Hartig
- Products: Investment banking
- Number of employees: 700+

Gruntal & Co. was a boutique investment banking and brokerage firm based in New York City. Prior to its acquisition in 2002, the firm was among the oldest independent investment banking houses in the U.S. The firm was founded as Sternberger & Fuld in 1880 by Maurice Sternberger, who partnered Ludwig Fuld. Sternberger bought a seat on the New York Stock Exchange in 1881 for $20,000. They were joined in 1884 by a third partner, Samuel Sinn, and the firm became Sternberger, Fuld & Sinn, with an office at 52 Broadway in Lower Manhattan.

Gruntal's brokerage business included more than 620 account executives across more than 30 locations throughout the U.S. The firm managed in excess of $19 billion of assets on behalf of its clients through its private client wealth management business. Additionally, the firm had a well-regarded investment banking, equity research as well as sales and trading operations.

Gruntal, which was headquartered in New York City was a member of the New York Stock Exchange and the National Association of Securities Dealers.

In 2002, Ryan Beck, a New Jersey–based investment banking firm, announced the acquisition of the bulk of the operations Gruntal. Following the acquisition, the Gruntal name which had been used since the early 1900s was retired. The firm, which had already been struggling to compete with the bulge bracket investment banks suffered the temporary loss of its headquarters after the September 11 attacks. The firm was located at 1 Liberty Plaza, across the street from the World Trade Center. Gruntal had already been eliminating certain businesses, including its corporate bond trading department in July 2001. In 2007, Ryan Beck & Co. was sold to Stifel Financial.

== Corporate affairs ==
=== Prominent former employees ===
- Steven A. Cohen founder of hedge funds S.A.C. Capital Advisors and Point72 Asset Management
- Stephen A. Feinberg Co-Founder and Co-Chief Executive Officer, Cerberus Capital Management
- Carl Icahn Investor and Founder of Icahn Enterprises, worked at the firm from 1964 until 1968
- Joseph Safina former Senior Vice President, current race car driver and businessman
