= Kaufman, Illinois =

- Unincorporated community
- Location within Illinois Location within the United States
- Coordinates: 38°51′45″N 89°46′38″W
- Country: United States
- State: Illinois
- County: Madison
- Elevation: 541 ft (165 m)
- Time zone: UTC-6 (Central (CST))
  - Summer (DST): UTC-5 (CDT)
- Area code: 618
- GNIS feature ID: 422858

Kaufman is an unincorporated community in Madison County, Illinois, United States.

== History ==
Kaufman was a station on the Toledo, St. Louis and Western Railroad (commonly known as the Clover Leaf).
