= Matt Kaufman (executive) =

American executive and engineer (born 1971)

- Born: Matthew Douglas Kaufman; March 7, 1971 (age 55); San Carlos, California, U.S.
- Education: University of California, Davis (BS); Virginia Tech (MS)
- Occupations: Engineer; Product developer; Executive
- Years active: 2017–present
- Website: sites.google.com/view/matt-kaufman/home

Matthew Douglas Kaufman (born March 7, 1971) is an American executive, engineer and product developer who currently serves as the Chief Safety Officer for Roblox. He previously served as the Vice President of Product and Product Operations at Roblox, and has previously worked at other companies such as Edgio in 2006.

== Early life and education ==
Matthew Douglas Kaufman was born in 1971 in San Carlos, California. He attended the University of California, Davis, where he graduated with a Bachelor of Science in 1994. Afterwards, he went to Virginia Tech, where he graduated with a Master of Science in 1996.

== Career ==
Kaufman first began working at Crunchbase, where he served as Head of Operations. He also worked for Edgio as a founding member for the company's technical team in 2006. He worked for other companies such as There.com and Ooodle.

=== Roblox ===
Kaufman joined Roblox on September 3, 2017 after an employment letter from Roblox that was dated from August 2017, which gave him the role as the Vice President for Product and Product Operations. In April 2018, he, alongside three others, joined the senior staff for Roblox. In 2023, he was appointed as the Chief Safety Officer for Roblox.

=== Controversies ===
In 2025, heavy controversy sparked over the safety for kids on Roblox. Kaufman responded by saying that Roblox will continue to add more safety features and moderation onto the platform. This was announced after 35 pending lawsuits against Roblox. After an update for age verification on Roblox released, Kaufman responded by saying that it was a misunderstanding between the AI in terms of checking for the user's age, where it was guessing with major inaccuracy.
