= Probitas Partners =

Independent global advisory firm

- Type: Private Ownership
- Industry: Private Equity, Infrastructure, Real estate, Hedge funds
- Founded: 2001
- Founder: Greg Hausler, Michael Hoffmann, Craig Marmer
- Headquarters: San Francisco, California, United States
- Products: Fund Raising, Portfolio Management, Secondary Advisory, Research
- Number of employees: 50+
- Website: www.probitaspartners.com

Probitas Partners is an independent, global advisory firm founded in 2001. The company is focused on raising capital as a placement agent for private equity fund sponsors as well as providing portfolio management and liquidity services, through the private equity secondary market, for investors in private equity. The firm operates through three primary businesses: fund placement, portfolio management and secondary advisory. In 2002, the firm established a European placement business.

Probitas Partners identifies and raises capital for some alternative fund managers across multiple strategies. Among the notable private equity firms that Probitas has represented in fundraising are: Alta Partners, CIVC Partners, Granite Ventures, KRG Capital, Littlejohn & Co., MidOcean Partners, and Panorama Capital.

In 2015, Probitas Partners announced the promotion of four new managing directors who will continue managing the growth of the firm. It was reported that "these promotions are in recognition of contributions to the success of the firm and in anticipation of continued success on behalf of our fund sponsor and institutional investor clients".
