= Paragon Partners =

German private equity company

Paragon Partners GmbH
- Company type: private (GmbH)
- Industry: private equity
- Founded: 2004; 22 years ago
- Headquarters: Munich, Germany
- Area served: Germany; Austria; Switzerland
- Key people: Marco Attolini; Edin Hadzic; Krischan von Moeller
- Number of employees: 35 (2021)
- Website: paragon.de

Paragon Partners (Paragon for short) is a European private equity company based in Munich, Germany. It was founded in 2004 and is owner-managed. Paragon focuses on medium-sized companies with an established business model. Investors comprise institutional investors such as life insurance companies and pension funds.

== History ==
In 2004, Paragon was founded by Edin Hadzic and Krischan von Moeller. Hadzic already had experience in the private equity industry through his partner position at Triton. Von Moeller had worked for the Holtzbrinck Publishing Group and the Boston Consulting Group. In 2010, Marco Attolini, who was previously also with Triton, joined the company as a third partner.

After initial successful investments, Paragon Secondary Partners was founded to bundle different assets. The investment fund was active until 2011. In 2008, Paragon then finally launched the Paragon Fund I with a volume of around €200 million. In 2009, the company achieved greater awareness with the acquisition of Schülerhilfe, the German market leader for private tutoring.

The Paragon Fund II, which was launched in 2014 with around €400 million in committed capital, sought to acquire the insolvent Weltbild Publishing Group to restructure it and keep it as a whole. Due to differences over transaction details, Paragon had to improve its offer but failed to complete the acquisition. In 2015, Paragon participated in a tight bidding round for the Balda Group but ultimately was not able to close the deal.

In 2019, the company launched its fourth investment fund, the Paragon Fund III, for which it raised almost €800 million. This enabled, among other things, the acquisition of the industrial services provider Castolin Eutectic. The acquisition of Castolin Eutectic was one of the most significant private equity transactions in Germany during the COVID-19 pandemic.

== Investments ==
Paragon invests in medium-sized companies in Germany, Austria, and Switzerland for several years. Generally, Paragon acquires a majority stake and supports companies in their strategic and operational development to increase their enterprise value. It usually takes five to seven years before Paragon sells the company again.

Since 2004, Paragon has invested in more than 30 companies. Currently, the portfolio includes about a dozen companies, including Pro Optik and the Weka Group. Total investments have a combined workforce of 6,000 and sales of €1.3 billion.

== Corporate affairs ==
Paragon operates as a limited liability company (GmbH) under German law. Its object extends to the investment in other companies as well as consulting services in this field. The Paragon Funds I, II, and III are structured as limited partnerships with limited liability (GmbH & Co. KG).

Paragon's shareholders are the three partners Marco Attolini, Edin Hadzic, and Krischan von Moeller. They each hold one third of the shares and also form the company's management. Currently, around 35 people work for Paragon.
