= Ryan Beck & Co. =

- Company type: Acquired
- Industry: Financial services
- Predecessor: John J. Ryan & Co.
- Founded: 1947
- Founder: John J. Ryan; Roy G. Beck
- Defunct: 2007
- Fate: Acquired in 2007 by Stifel Financial
- Headquarters: West Orange, New Jersey (First HQ); Livingston, New Jersey (Final HQ)
- Products: Investment banking, Municipal bonds, Brokerage

Ryan Beck & Co. was founded in 1946 by John J. Ryan, an investment banking and brokerage firm based in New Jersey. Since its acquisition in 2007, the firm is no longer operating. Today Ryan Beck & Co. continue to provide investment banking and brokerage services under the Stifel brand.

== History ==
The firm, originally known as John J. Ryan & Co., was founded in 1946 by John J. Ryan, a Lehman Brothers bond buyer. In 1951, Roy G. Beck, who had his own small firm, joined the firm working as the lead bond salesman.

In the early years, the firm focused on underwriting municipal bonds in New Jersey and grew relatively slowly. In 1966, John J. Ryan & Co. was named co-manager of the $179-million bond issue for the New Jersey Turnpike which established the firm as one of the leading underwriters of municipal bonds in New Jersey. Also, in the 1960s, the firm began to shift its focus toward financial services companies, particularly banks. In 1963, the firm formed a bank-stock trading and research subsidiary. In 1969, the company established a mergers and acquisitions department, which quickly earned a mandate to advise on the merger of the Bank of Sussex County into National Community Bank (later acquired by Bank of New York).

In 1986, the company completed an initial public offering on the New York Stock Exchange. In 1998, the firm was acquired by BankAtlantic. In 2002, Ryan Beck announced the acquisition of the bulk of the operations Gruntal & Co., one of the oldest investment banks in U.S. in a deal that quadrupled Ryan Beck & Co's assets. In 2006, the firm filed to an initial public offering to sell $100m of stock before changing course and selling to Stifel Financial in 2007. At the time of sale, Ryan Beck had approximately 1,000 employees in 40 offices, located in 14 states.
