= Bulge bracket =

World's largest investment banks

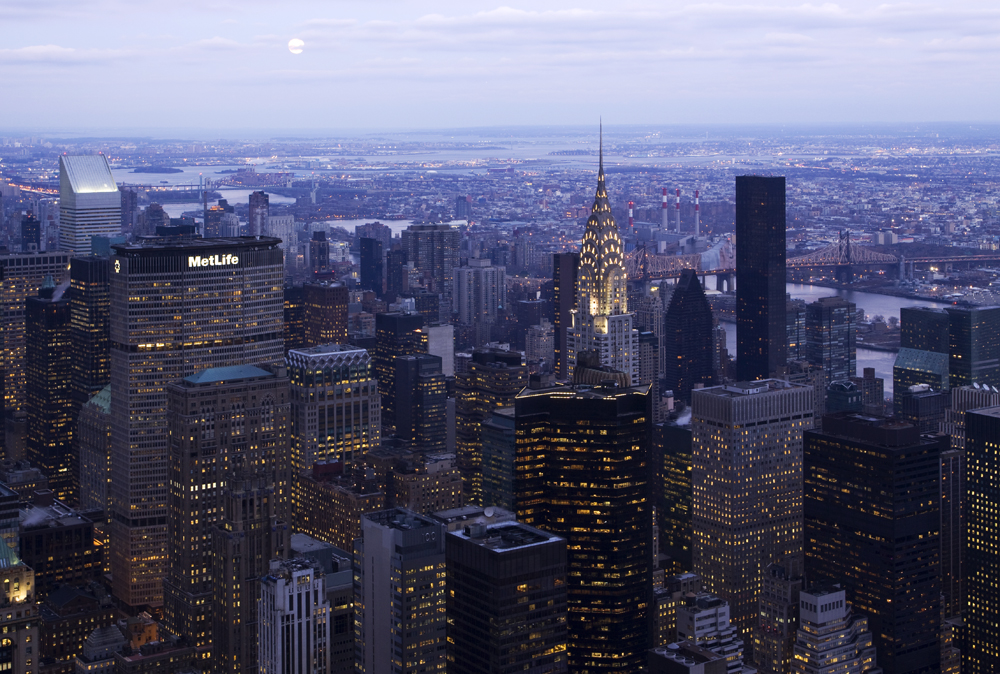
Most "bulge bracket" banks maintain central offices in New York City, one of the three key global financial hubs alongside London and Hong Kong.

Bulge bracket banks are the world's largest global investment banks, serving mostly large corporations, institutional investors and governments. The descriptor "bulge bracket" comes from the way investment banks are listed on the "tombstone", or public notification of a financial transaction, where the largest advisors on investment banking operations (mergers, acquisitions, IPOs, or debt issuance) are listed first. The designation of a bulge bracket bank is primarily based on the bank's financial advisory business, as opposed to sales and trading.

== Overview ==
Bulge bracket banks usually provide both advisory and financing banking services, as well as the sales, market making, and research on a broad array of financial products including equities, credit, rates, commodities and their derivatives. They are also heavily involved in the invention of new financial products, such as mortgage-backed securities (MBS) in the 1980s, credit default swaps (CDS) in the 1990s, collateralized debt obligations (CDO) in the 2000s, and today, carbon emission trading and insurance-linked products.

Bulge bracket firms are usually primary dealers in US treasury securities. Bulge bracket banks are also global in the sense that they have a strong presence in all four of the world's major regions: the Americas, Europe, the Middle East and Africa (EMEA) and Asia-Pacific (APAC).

== History ==
According to biographer Ron Chernow's 1990 book The House of Morgan, "in the late 1960s and early 1970s, the top tier—called the bulge bracket—consisted of Morgan Stanley; First Boston; Kuhn, Loeb; and Dillon, Read." Morgan Stanley appeared above the other members of the bulge bracket by demanding and receiving the role of syndicate manager. While order within brackets was otherwise determined alphabetically, Chernow describes this positioning as being of "life-and-death" importance to the firms. Chernow says that Bache Halsey Stuart Shields Incorporated's name was chosen based on a desire to be placed as high as possible within its bracket.

According to Chernow, Morgan Stanley "queasily noted the rise of Salomon Brothers and Goldman Sachs, which were using their trading skills to chip away at the four dominant firms." In 1975, to more reflect economic reality, Morgan Stanley removed Kuhn, Loeb and Dillon, Read, and replaced them with Merrill Lynch, Salomon Brothers and Goldman Sachs. Chernow describes' Morgan Stanley's place at the top of the bracket as a "gilded anachronism" by the late 1970s.

For Morgan Stanley, the doomsday trumpet sounded in 1979. That year, IBM asked the firm to accept Salomon Brothers as co-manager on a $1 billion debt issue needed for a new generation of computers... After much resounding talk, nearly everybody [at Morgan Stanley] voted to defy IBM and demand sole management. Morgan Stanley was shocked when word came back that IBM hadn't budged in its demand: Salomon Brothers would head the issue, as planned. It was a landmark in Wall Street history: the golden chains [of Morgan dominance] were smashed.

By the 1980s a revised bulge bracket had been defined. The New York Times in 1987 reported that

Of these, six firms—The First Boston Corporation, Goldman, Sachs & Company, Merrill Lynch & Company, Morgan Stanley & Company, Salomon Brothers and Shearson Lehman Brothers—are so powerful that they make up the bulge bracket, so-called because more often than not they lead the deals, garnering the top tombstone spots.

In the 1990s, the dominance of the bulge bracket firms was globalizing. In 2001 The New York Times reported that "The real battle for the bulge bracket is taking place in Europe."

== Modern list ==
In 2020, the Corporate Finance Institute, a Canadian financial analyst certification organization, and Wall Street Oasis, an online investment banking and finance forum, listed nine investment banks as part of the bulge bracket category. Investopedia in 2022 listed the same banks. As of March 2023, there are eight bulge bracket banks, following the acquisition of Credit Suisse by UBS. In alphabetical order:

- (United States) Bank of America
- (United Kingdom) Barclays
- (United States) Citigroup
- (Germany) Deutsche Bank
- (United States) Goldman Sachs
- (United States) JPMorgan Chase
- (United States) Morgan Stanley
- (Switzerland) UBS

== See also ==
- Boutique investment bank
- List of investment banks
- Primary dealer
