= List of brazing alloys =

Composition by weight %	Family	Solidus/liquidus point (°C)	Toxic	Comments	Cu	Zn	Ag	Au	Pd	Pt	Ti	Cr	Mo	W	Mn	Fe	Co	Ni	Cd	Sn	Al	B	Si	P	other
Al_{94.75}Si_{5.25}	Al	575/630	–	BAlSi-1, AL 101																	94.75		5.25		
Al_{92.5}Si_{7.5}	Al	575/615	–	AL 102cu																	92.5		7.5		
Al_{90}Si_{10}	Al	575/590	–	BAlSi-5, AL 103																	90		10		
Al_{88}Si_{12}	Al	575/585; 577/582	–	BAlSi-4, AL 104, AL 718, L-ALSi12, BrazeTec L88/12. Free-flowing, most fluid of aluminium filler metals. General purpose filler metal, can be used with brazeable aluminiums in all types of brazing. For joining aluminium and its alloys. Can be used for joining aluminium and titanium to dissimilar metals; the risk of galvanic corrosion then has to be considered. Excellent corrosion resistance when joining aluminiums. Grayish-white color. Usable for both flame and furnace brazing.																	88		12		
Al_{86}Si_{10}Cu_{4}	Al	520/585	–	BAlSi-3, AL 201, AL 716. General purpose filler metal, can be used with brazeable aluminiums in all types of brazing. For joining aluminium and its alloys. Good corrosion resistance. Can be used for joining aluminium and titanium to dissimilar metals; the risk of galvanic corrosion then has to be considered. Tendency to liquation, has to be heated rapidly through the melting range. Grayish-white color.	4																86		10		
Al_{88.75}Si_{9.75}Mg_{1.5}	Al	555/590	–	AL 301. Suitable for vacuum brazing.																	88.75		9.75		Mg_{1.5}
Al_{88.65}Si_{9.75}Mg_{1.5}Bi_{0.1}	Al	555/590	–	AL 302. Suitable for vacuum brazing.																	88.65		9.75		Mg_{1.5}Bi_{0.1}
Al_{76}Cu_{4}Zn_{10}Si_{10}	Al	516/560	–	AL 719. For joining aluminium and its alloys. Can be used for brazing otherwise unbrazeable aluminiums, e.g. castings. Used with flux. Unsuitable for vacuum brazing due to high zinc content. Worse corrosion resistance due to higher alloying. Tendency to liquation, has to be heated rapidly through the melting range. Grayish-white color.	4	10															76		10		
Zn_{98}Al_{2}		382/392	–	AL 802. General purpose filler metal for aluminium soldering/brazing with a torch. Grayish-white color.		98															2				
Al_{73}Cu_{20}Si_{5}Ni_{2}Bi_{0.01}Be_{0.01}Sr_{0.01}	Al–Cu–Si	515/535	–	For brazing aluminium. Traces of bismuth and beryllium disrupt the surface aluminium oxide. Strontium refines grain structure of the brazing alloy, improving ductility and toughness.	20													2			73		5		Bi,Be,Sr
Al_{61.3}Cu_{22.5}Zn_{9.5}Si_{4.5}Ni_{1.2}Bi_{0.01}Be_{0.01}Sr_{0.01}	Al–Cu–Si	495/505	–	For brazing aluminium. Traces of bismuth and beryllium disrupt the surface aluminium oxide. Strontium refines grain structure of the brazing alloy, improving ductility and toughness.	22.5	9.5												1.2			61.3		4.5		Bi–Be–Sr
Al_{71}Cu_{20}Si_{7}Sn_{2}	Al–Cu–Si	505/525	–	For brazing aluminium.	20															2	71		7		
Al_{70}Cu_{20}Si_{7}Sn_{2}Mg_{1}	Al–Cu–Si	501/522	–	For brazing aluminium.	20															2	70		7		Mg_{1}
Zn_{85}Al_{15}		381/452	–	AL 815. General purpose filler metal for aluminium soldering/brazing with a torch. Grayish-white color.		85															15				
Zn_{78}Al_{22}		426/482	–	AL 822. High-strength, low-temperature. For aluminium-to-aluminium and aluminium-to-copper.		78															22				
Ag_{72}Zn_{28}		710/730	–	Ag72Zn. Ammonia-resistant. For joining ferrous and non-ferrous metals (steel, copper, brass...). Good flow properties. With stainless steel in humid environments risk of interfacial corrosion. Copper-free, good where copper presence is not desired and/or in presence of ammonia. (Ammonia in presence of water rapidly attacks copper-containing alloys.) Intended especially for brazing tubes in refrigeration systems using ammonia (R717) as refrigerant.		28	72																		
Ag_{85}Mn_{15}		960/970	–	Ag85Mn, BAg-23, AG 501, Ag 485, Silver Braze 85. Ammonia-resistant. For joining ferrous and non-ferrous metals (steel, stainless steel, copper, bronze, brass...). Very good flow properties. Good for stainless steel in humid or wet environments as there is no risk of interfacial corrosion. Copper-free, zinc-free. Good where copper presence is not desired and/or in presence of ammonia. (Ammonia in presence of water rapidly attacks copper-containing alloys.) Intended especially for brazing tubes in refrigeration systems using ammonia (R717) as refrigerant, or for high-temperature brazing of stainless steels.			85								15										
Cu_{80}Ag_{15}P_{5}	Cu–Ag–P	643/802; 645/700; 645/800	–	BCuP-5, CP 102, CP1, Sil-Fos, Silvaloy 15, Matti-phos 15, SILVERPHOS 15. Ductile, slow-flowing. Gap-filling. Can resist torsional stresses, shock loads, and flexing. For copper, copper alloys, brass, bronze. Primarily for copper-to-copper. Can be used also on silver, tungsten and molybdenum. Low vibration resistance. Light copper color. Used in plumbing. Frequently used for resistance brazing. Used where ductility is important and low tolerances are not achievable. Ductile copper-copper joints. Used on electrical assemblies, e.g. motors or contacts. Used in refrigeration and air conditioning systems, and brass and copper pipe fitting. More fluid than BCuP-3 due to higher phosphorus content. Mutually soluble with copper and copper alloys. Strong tendency to liquate. Available also in strip and sheet form. Recommended joint clearance 0.051–0.127 mm (0.002-0.005"). Flow point 705 °C. Maximum service temperature 149 °C (intermittently 204 °C).	80		15																	5	
Cu_{75.75}Ag_{18}P_{6.25}	Cu–Ag–P	643/668	–	Silvaloy 18M, SILVERPHOS 18. Close to eutectic, narrow melting range, suitable for low heating rates, e.g. in furnace brazing. Very fluid, for tight-fitting joints. For copper, copper alloys, brass, bronze. Can be used also on silver, tungsten and molybdenum. Due to low melting point suitable for joining copper to brass, as dezincification of brass is less pronounced. Light copper color. Maximum service temperature 204 °C (intermittently 260 °C).	75.75		18																	6.25	
Cu_{45.75}Ag_{18}Zn_{36}Si_{0.25}	Ag–Cu–Zn	784/816	–	Matti-sil 18Si. Cheaper alternative of high-silver alloys. Suitable for automotive industry for brazing steel components where higher-temperature bronze alloys can not be used. Gap 0.075–0.2 mm.	45.75	36	18																0.25		
Cu_{75.9}Ag_{17.6}P_{6.5}	Cu–Ag–P	643	–	Sil-Fos 18. Eutectic. For copper, brass and bronze alloys. Self-fluxing on copper. Extremely fluid. Good fitup required. Gap 0.025–0.075 mm. Gray color.	75.9		17.6																	6.5	
Cu_{89}Ag_{5}P_{6}	Cu–Ag–P	643/813; 645/825; 645/815	–	BCuP-3, CP 104, CP4, Sil-Fos 5, Silvaloy 5, Matti-phos 5, SILVERPHOS 5. Slow-flowing, very fluid. Less expensive than BCuP-5. Can fill gaps and form fillets. Strong tendency to liquate. For copper tube brazing, used in plumbing. Used for fluxless brazing in refrigeration, air conditioning, medical gas pipework, and heat exchangers. Gap 0.051–0.127 mm. Flow point 720 °C. Light copper color. Maximum service temperature 149 °C (intermittently 204 °C).	89		5																	6	
Cu_{88}Ag_{6}P_{6}	Cu–Ag–P	643/807	–	Silvaloy 6. Flow point 720 °C. For copper, copper alloys, brass, bronze. Primarily for copper-to-copper. Can be used also on silver, tungsten and molybdenum. Low vibration resistance. Light copper color. Maximum service temperature 149 °C (intermittently 204 °C).	88		6																	6	
Cu_{86.75}Ag_{6}P_{7.25}	Cu–Ag–P	645/720; 645/750; 641/718	–	BCuP-4, Sil-Fos 6, Matti-phos 6, SILVERPHOS 6HP. Very fluid, fast flow, for narrow joints. Low melting range. Flow point 690 °C. Lowest melting point from the low-silver alloys. Low cost. Used for fluxless brazing in refrigeration, air conditioning, medical gas pipework, and heat exchangers. Tends to liquate. Extremely fluid above flow point, readily penetrates narrow gaps. Gap 0.025–0.076 mm (0.05–0.2 mm). Less ductile than BCuP-1 or BCuP-5.	86.75		6																	7.25	
Cu_{90.5}Ag_{2}P_{7}	Cu–Ag–P	705/800	–	CP 202, CP3. Gap-filling. Used in plumbing.	90.5		2																	7	
Cu_{91}Ag_{2}P_{7}	Cu–Ag–P	643/802; 645/875; 643/788; 641/780	–	BCuP-6, CP 105, Sil-Fos 2, Silvaloy 2, Matti-phos 2, SILVERPHOS 2. Medium flow. Flow point 704–720 °C. Very fluid, can penetrate narrow gaps. Gaps 0.025–0.127 mm (0.05–0.2 mm). Comparable to Fos-Flo 7. For copper, copper alloys, brass, bronze. Primarily for copper-to-copper. Can be used also on silver, tungsten and molybdenum. Low vibration resistance. Tends to liquate. Light copper color. Maximum service temperature 149 °C (intermittently 204 °C).	91		2																	7	
Cu_{91.5}Ag_{2}P_{6.5}	Cu–Ag–P	643/796	–	Silvaloy 2M. Medium flow. Flow point 718 °C. Very fluid, can penetrate narrow gaps. For copper, copper alloys, brass, bronze. Primarily for copper-to-copper. Can be used also on silver, tungsten and molybdenum. Low vibration resistance. Light copper color. Maximum service temperature 149 °C (intermittently 204 °C).	91.5		2																	6.5	
Cu_{91.7}Ag_{1.5}P_{6.8}	Cu–Ag–P	643/799	–	Silvalite. For copper, brass and bronze. Self-fluxing on copper. Also usable on silver, tungsten, and molybdenum. Primarily for copper-to-copper joining. Low resistance to vibrations. Good for tight-fitting copper pipes and tubing. Extremely fluid, will penetrate even thin joints. Light copper color. Maximum service temperature 149 °C (intermittently 204 °C). Flow point 732 °C. Optimal brazing temperature slightly above flow point. Sluggish at low temperatures, suitable for gap-filling. Very fluid at high temperatures, suitable for deep penetration to tight-fitting joints.	91.7		1.5																	6.8	
Cu_{92.85}Ag_{1}P_{6}Sn_{0.15}	Cu–Ag–P	643/821	–	Silvabraze 33830. For copper, brass and bronze. Self-fluxing on copper. Also usable on silver, tungsten, and molybdenum. Primarily for copper-to-copper joining. Low resistance to vibrations. Good for tight-fitting copper pipes and tubing. Extremely fluid, will penetrate even thin joints. Light copper color. Maximum service temperature 149 °C (intermittently 204 °C).	92.85		1													0.15				6	
Cu_{93.5}P_{6.5}	Cu–P	645/740	–	CP 105, CP2. Gap-filling. Used in plumbing.	93.5																			6.5	
Cu_{92.8}P_{7.2}	Cu–P	710/793; 710/795	–	BCuP-2, Fos-Flo 7, Silvaloy 0, Copper-flo, PHOSCOPPER 0. Fast flow, very fluid. Can withstand moderate vibration, not very ductile. For copper, brass and bronze. Primarily for copper-to-copper. Can be used also on silver, tungsten and molybdenum. For joining tight fittings and tubing, will penetrate narrow gaps. Unsuitable for larger gaps, should be used only where good fitup can be maintained. For heat exchanger return bends, hot water cylinders, refrigeration pipes. Flow point 730 °C. Gap 0.051–0.127 mm (0.075–0.2 mm, 0.025–0.076). Tends to liquate. Maximum service temperature 149 °C, intermittently 204 °C. Steel gray color.	92.8																			7.2	
Cu_{93.85}P_{6.15}	Cu–P	710/854	–	Fos-Flo 6. Ductile, moderate flow. Economical. Wide melting range. Use where joint tolerances are larger and ductility is important. Flow point 746 °C. Gap 0.076–0.127 mm.	93.85																			6.15	
Cu_{97}Ni_{3}B_{0.02–0.05}	Cu	1085/1100	–	CU 105. Fluid. Capable of bridging larger gaps than pure copper (up to 0.7 mm in extreme cases).	97													3				0.05			
Cu_{99}Ag_{1}	Cu	1070/1080	–	CU 106. Slightly lower melting point than pure copper. More expensive due to silver content. Rarely used now. Can be used after CU 105 in step brazing.	99		1																		
Cu_{95}Sn_{4.7}P_{0.3}	Cu–Sn	953/1048	–	CDA 510. Bronze. For steels where lower temperature than with pure copper is required.	95															4.7				0.3	
Cu_{93.5}Sn_{6.3}P_{0.2}	Cu–Sn	910/1040	–	CU 201. Bronze. Requires fast heating to avoid problems with wide melting range.	93.5															6.3				0.2	
Cu_{92}Sn_{7.7}P_{0.3}	Cu–Sn	881/1026	–	CDA 521. Bronze. For steels where lower temperature than with pure copper is required.	92															7.7				0.3	
Cu_{87.8}Sn_{12}P_{0.2}	Cu–Sn	825/990	–	CU 202. Bronze. Requires fast heating to avoid problems with wide melting range.	87.8															12				0.2	
Cu_{86.5}Sn_{7}P_{6.5}	Cu–Sn	649/700	–	Silvacap 35490. Bronze. Self-fluxing on copper. Generally provides joints stronger than the base metals. Used for joining copper assemblies with low tolerances. Maximum service temperature 204 °C, intermittently 316 °C.	86.5															7				6.5	
Cu_{86.8}Sn_{7}P_{6.2}	Cu–Sn	657/688	–	Fos-Flo 670. Low-cost. Useful for joining copper to copper or copper alloys where strong impacts and vibrations are not encountered. Requires good fitup. Self-fluxing on copper. Silver-free. Extremely fluid above flow point, for tight-fitting joints. Gap 0.025–0.075 mm. Light brown color.	86.8															7				6.2	
Cu_{85.3}Sn_{7}P_{6.2}Ni_{1.5}	Cu–Sn	612/682	–	Fos-Flo 671. Low-cost. Useful for joining copper to copper or copper alloys where strong impacts and vibrations are not encountered. Requires good fitup. Self-fluxing on copper. Silver-free. Extremely fluid above flow point, for tight-fitting joints. Gap 0.025–0.075 mm.	85.3													1.5		7				6.2	
Cu_{58.5}Zn_{41.3}Si_{0.2}	Cu–Zn	875/895	–	CU 301. Brass. Brasses are often used on mild steel assemblies. For use on brass, bronze, and low carbon steel. Used in plumbing.	58.5	41.3																	0.2		
Cu_{58.5}Zn_{41.1}Sn_{0.2}Si_{0.2}	Cu–Zn	875/895	–	CU 302. Brass. For carbon steel and galvanized steel. Used in plumbing.	58.5	41.1														0.2			0.2		
Cu_{60}Zn_{39.55}Si_{0.3}Mn_{0.15}	Cu–Zn	870/900	–	CU 303. Brass.	60	39.55									0.15								0.3		
Cu_{60}Zn_{39.8}Ni_{10}Si_{0.2}	Cu–Zn	875/890	–	BrazeTec 60/40. For brazing zinc-coated tubes. Similar to CU 303.	60	39.8																	0.2		
Cu_{60}Zn_{29.35}Sn_{0.35}Si_{0.3}	Cu–Zn	870/900	–	CU 304. Brass.	60	29.35														0.35			0.3		
Cu_{60}Zn_{40}	Cu–Zn	865/887	–	RBCuZn-C, CDA 681. Brass. Fluid. For alloys of iron, copper, and nickel.	60	40																			
Cu_{46}Zn_{45.4}Sn_{0.5}Si_{0.1}Ni_{8}	Cu–Zn	890/920	–	CU 305. Brass. For use on carbon and galvanized steel, slightly higher tensile strength than CU 302. Used in plumbing.	46	45.4												8		0.5			0.1		
Cu_{48}Zn_{41.8}Ni_{10}Si_{0.2}	Cu–Zn	890/920	–	BrazeTec 48/10. For brazing steel tube frames.	48	41.8												10					0.2		
Cu_{56}Zn_{38.25}Sn_{1.5}Si_{0.5}Mn_{0.2}Ni_{0.2}	Cu–Zn	870/890	–	CU 306. Brass. For use on cast and malleable iron. Used in plumbing.	56	38.25									0.2			0.2		1.5			0.5		
Cu_{54.85}Zn_{25}Mn_{12}Ni_{8}Si_{0.15}	Cu–Zn	855/915	–	Hi-Temp 080. Economical. High-strength. For attaching carbides to alloy steels. Light yellow joint.	54.85	25									12			8					0.15		
Cu_{52.5}Mn_{38}Ni_{9.5}	Cu–Mn	855/915; 879/927	–	AMS 4764, Hi-Temp 095, Nicuman 38. High-strength. For carbides, steels, stainless steels, cast iron, and nickel refractory alloys. Ideal for combined brazing/heat treatment. Good for materials where copper-brazing would require too high temperature or where boron alloys would be detrimental. Relatively free-flowing; melting point may rise when more nickel is dissolved from the base metal. Fluxless brazing requires vacuum, argon or dry hydrogen atmosphere. Reddish gray color.	52.5										38			9.5							
Cu_{67.5}Mn_{23.5}Ni_{9}	Cu–Mn	925/955	–	Nicuman 23.	67.5										23.5			9							
Cu_{55}Zn_{35}Ni_{6}Mn_{4}	Cu–Zn	880/920; 866/885	–	Hi-Temp 548, Silvaloy X55. Modified nickel-silver. Moderate-strength, tough. Excellent plasticity in molten state. Gap-filling. Excellent strength and ductility during cooling, which is an advantage over silver brazes when joining materials with dissimilar thermal expansion. For carbides, stainless steels, tool steels, and nickel alloys. Used for joining carbide tool tips to steel holders. Light yellow color. May contain 0.2% silicon for better flow. For induction, torch and furnace brazing.	55	35									4			6							
Cu_{87}Mn_{10}Co_{2}	Cu–Mn	960/1030	–	Hi-Temp 870. High-temperature strength. Free-flowing. For carbides, stainless steels, tool steels, and nickel alloys. Excellent wetting of carbides, stainless steel and copper. Good gap-filling at lower brazing temperatures. Fluxless brazing possible in vacuum or suitable atmosphere. Brazing often done together with heat treatment.	87										10		2								
Cu_{87.75}Ge_{12}Ni_{0.25}	Cu	880/975	–	Gemco. Used for special purposes, e.g. brazing CFC (carbon fibre composites), pure copper, copper-zirconium alloys and molybdenum. As the braze does not contain active elements, the carbon-based material may have to be surface-treated for sufficient wetting, e.g. by a solid-state reaction with chromium.	87.5													0.25							Ge_{12}
Ag_{38}Cu_{32}Zn_{28}Sn_{2}	Ag–Cu–Zn	649/721; 650/720; 660/720	–	BAg-34, AMS 4761, Braze 380, Silvaloy A38T, Silver Braze 38. Free-flowing, for ferrous alloys, nickel, copper and their alloys, and combinations. Tin content improves wetting of tungsten carbide, stainless steel, and other difficult metals. Absence of lead and cadmium allows use of long heating cycles. Cheaper alternative of BAg-28 with similar properties. Suitable for fluxless controlled atmosphere brazing. Mostly used in furnace brazing. Best for narrow gaps. General purpose alloy for air conditioning applications for joining steels, copper, and copper and nickel alloys. Gap 0.075–0.2 mm. Pale yellow color. Maximum service temperature 204 °C (intermittently 316 °C).	32	28	38													2					
Ag_{40}Cu_{30}Zn_{30}	Ag–Cu–Zn	674/727; 675/725	–	Braze 401, AMS 4762. Low-temperature, fairly free flowing. Narrow melting range. For ferrous and non-ferrous metals. For copper alloys, brass, nickel silver, bronze, mild steel, stainless steel, nickel, and Monel. Cadmium-free substitute of BAg-2a. Moderate liquation, but can be exploited for bridging larger gaps. Pale yellow color.	30	30	40																		
Ag_{45}Cu_{30}Zn_{25}	Ag–Cu–Zn	663/743; 665/745; 675/735	–	BAg-5, Braze 450, Silvaloy A45, Matti-sil 45, Silver Braze 45. Low-temperature. For ferrous, non-ferrous, and dissimilar metals. For band instruments, brass lamps, ship piping, aircraft engine oil coolers. Can be used in food industry. Allows larger joint clearances. Melting range sufficient to braze joints with gaps commonly encountered in commercial tubing and fittings. Yellow white color. Maximum service temperature 204 °C (intermittently 316 °C). Gap 0.075–0.2 mm.	30	25	45																		
Ag_{45.75}Cu_{18.3}Zn_{25.62}Ni_{1.93}	Ag–Cu–Zn		–		18.3	25.62	45.75											1.93							
Ag_{50}Cu_{20}Zn_{28}Ni_{2}	Ag–Cu–Zn	660/707; 660/705	–	BAg-24, AMS 4788, Braze 505, Silvaloy A50N, Argo-braze 502, Silver Braze 50Ni2. For most metals, incl. stainless steel and carbides. Highly recommended. Recommended for 300-series stainless steel. Good for food-handling applications with close joint tolerances. Gap 0.1–0.25 mm. Alloy specifically designed for brazing tungsten carbide tips to steel tools and wear parts. Readily wets nickel and iron alloys. Nickel offsets embrittlement by aluminium diffusion when brazing aluminium bronzes. Retards interface corrosion where base metals can cope. Zinc-free alloys suggested where there is a risk of dezincification, e.g. exposure to salt water at high temperatures. Very fluid, quickly fills long narrow joints. Tends to liquate. Yellow-white color. Cadmium-free replacement for BAg-3.	20	28	50											2							
Ag_{54}Cu_{40}Zn_{5}Ni_{1}	Ag–Cu–Zn	725/855; 718/857	–	BAg-13, AMS 4772, Braze 541, Silvaloy A54N, Silver Braze 54. Atmosphere furnace brazing. Melts through mushy state, tends to liquate. Broader melting range suitable for non-uniform clearances. Suitable for hand-feeding of wide-gap joints as the mushy alloy can be worked into shape. For joining ferrous, nonferrous and dissimilar metals. Used in furnace brazings due to low zinc content. For high-temperature applications e.g. on jet engines, especially on stainless steel; maximum service temperature 371 °C. Used in many jet engine subassemblies for US Air Force. White color.	40	5	54											1							
Ag_{56}Cu_{42}Ni_{2}	Ag–Cu	770/895; 771/893	–	BAg-13a, AMS 4765, Braze 559, Silver Braze 56Ni2. Atmosphere furnace brazing. For high-temperature applications (up to 370 °C), e.g. on jet engines. Zinc free; used instead of BAg-13 where zinc fumes in the furnace are not allowed. Similar to BAg-13. Tends to liquate. Can be used for wide gap joints. Can be used with flux, but mostly used for fluxless furnace brazing of stainless steel in dry hydrogen. White color.	42		56											2							
Ag_{49}Cu_{16}Zn_{23}Mn_{7.5}Ni_{4.5}	Ag–Cu–Zn	680/700; 682/699	–	BAg-22, AG 502, Braze 495, Silvaloy A49NM, Argo-braze 49H, Silver Braze 49Ni4. Low-temperature. For tungsten carbide and all types of carbon steels and stainless steels. For attaching tungsten carbide tips to steel holders. Excellent wetting properties, used extensively for attaching tungsten carbide bits to cutting tools and rock drills. Tends to liquate.	16	23	49								7.5			4.5							
Ag_{49}Cu_{27.5}Zn_{20.5}Mn_{2.5}Ni_{0.5}	Ag–Cu–Zn	670/710	–	Argo-braze 49LM. For attaching tungsten carbide tips to steel holders. Supplied as Trifoil – copper foil sandwiched between braze alloy foils. The copper layer helps absorbing stresses caused by differential heating.	27.5	20.5	49								2.5			0.5							
Ag_{65}Cu_{20}Zn_{15}	Ag–Cu–Zn	670/720	–	BAg-9, Braze 650, Silver Braze 65. For iron, silverware, and nickel alloys. Slight tendency to liquate. Silver-white color; used in silversmithing due to color match. Corrosion-resistant. Remelt temperature altered by dissolving base metal; increased by silver, decreased by copper. Often used for step brazing.	20	15	65																		
Ag_{65}Cu_{28}Mn_{5}Ni_{2}	Ag–Cu	750/850	–	Braze 655. For alloys like kovar and invar to copper, for vacuum tubes. As rubbing seals in jet engines.	28		65								5			2							
Ag_{70}Cu_{20}Zn_{10}	Ag–Cu–Zn	690/740	–	BAg-10, Braze 700, Silver Braze 70. For silverware. Wets nickel and iron alloys. For step brazing, with BAg-9 as next step. Slight tendency to liquate. Silver-white color; used in silversmithing due to color match. Corrosion-resistant. Remelt temperature altered by dissolving base metal; increased by silver, decreased by copper. Often used for step brazing.	20	10	70																		
Ag_{56}Cu_{22}Zn_{17}Sn_{5}	Ag–Cu–Zn	620/655; 618/652; 620/650	–	BAg-7, AG 102, L-Ag55Sn, Ag 1, AMS 4763, Braze 560, Silvaloy A56T, Matti-sil 56Sn, BrazeTec 5600, Silver Braze 56. Low-melting. Excellent for general purpose brazing of close-tolerance joints. Lowest melting point cadmium-free silver alloy. Low zinc content minimizes issues with prolonged or repeated heating. Slight tendency to liquate. Used in plumbing. Used in food equipment. Gap 0.05–0.15 mm. White color; often chosen for silver or stainless steel due to excellent color match. Maximum service temperature 204 °C (intermittently 316 °C). For brazing steels, copper and its alloys, nickel and its alloys. Good alternative to cadmium-containing brazes. Good wicking. Can be used for induction brazing and flame brazing. Used in electrotechnics, automotive industry and toolmaking. For improved corrosion resistance on stainless steel, use a nickel-containing alloy, e.g. BAg-24 or BAg-21.	22	17	56													5					
Ag_{57.5}Cu_{32.5}Sn_{7}Mn_{3}	Ag–Cu	605/730	–	Braze 580. Free-flowing. For brazing tungsten carbide. Wets some metals that are difficult to wet by more standard alloys, e.g. chromium and tungsten carbides. Does not tend to produce porous fillets despite manganese content. Excellent wetting of high manganese stainless steels in vacuum brazing. Does not outgas during titanium nitride coating.	32.5		57.5								3					7					
Ag_{68}Cu_{27}Sn_{5}	Ag–Cu	743/760	–	Cusiltin 5. Low vapor pressure. Stronger than BAg-8.	27		68													5					
Ag_{60}Cu_{25}Zn_{15}	Ag–Cu–Zn	675/720	–	Braze 600. For nickel alloys (e.g. Monel). For silverware instead of BAg-9 when only one joint is needed. Fluidity decreased on copper and increased on silver due to dissolution of base metal. Easily wets nickel and iron alloys due to zinc content. Eutectiferous. White color, slightly more yellow than BAg-9.	25	15	60																		
Ag_{71.5}Cu_{28}Ni_{0.5}	Ag–Cu	780/795	–	BAg-8b, BVAg-8b, AMS 4766, Braze 715, Braze 716 (VTG grade, for vacuum systems, with reduced volatile impurities) For ferrous and nonferrous alloys. For atmospheric brazing of nickel and ferrous alloys. High electrical and thermal conductivity. Nickel-modified silver-copper eutectic. Nickel addition makes the alloy more sluggish but improves wetting of ferrous alloys. Dissolution of copper, silver or nickel from base metal increases remelt temperature. Silver-white color.	28		71.5											0.5							
Ag_{72}Cu_{28}	Ag–Cu	780; 779.4	–	BAg-8, BVAg-8, Silvaloy B72, Braze 720, Braze 721 (VTG grade, for vacuum systems, with reduced volatile impurities), Silver Braze 72. Eutectic. For nonferrous alloys. Remelt temperature increased by dissolution of copper or silver from the base metals. High electrical and thermal conductivity. For controlled-atmosphere fluxless brazing. Very fluid when molten. Limited wetting on nickel and ferrous metals, poor wetting on carbon steel; in these cases wetting mediated by copper as iron and nickel are not soluble in silver but are soluble in copper. Wetting in hydrogen atmosphere is superior to wetting with flux. Mostly used on copper and nickel alloys. Used with reducing or inert atmospheres or vacuum. Widely used for joining metalized ceramics to metals in vacuum. White color. Maximum service temperature 204 °C (intermittently 316 °C).	28		72																		
Ag_{71.7}Cu_{28}Li_{0.3}	Ag–Cu–Li	760	–	BAg-8a, Lithobraze 720, Lithobraze BT, Silver Braze 72a High fluidity. For ferrous and nonferrous alloys. Especially suitable for thin stainless steel. For general purpose fluxless furnace brazing of stainless steels. Requires hydrogen or inert atmosphere.	28		71.7																		Li_{0.3}
Ag_{92.5}Cu_{7.3}Li_{0.2}	Ag–Cu–Li	760/890	–	BAg-19, Lithobraze 925, Silver Braze 92.5. Good for precipitation-hardened steel. Often used for joining skins to honeycomb cores of airframe structures made of precipitation-hardened steels. For general purpose fluxless furnace brazing of stainless steels. Not suitable for torch brazing. Requires hydrogen or inert atmosphere, most often argon. Silver-white color.	7.3		92.5																		Li_{0.3}
Ag_{63}Cu_{28.5}Sn_{6}Ni_{2.5}	Ag–Cu	690/800; 691/802	–	BAg-21, AMS 4774, Braze 630, Nicusiltin 6, Silver Braze 63. For 400-series stainless steels. Resistant to chloride corrosion and dezincification; withstands chlorine solutions, salt sprays, etc. Very sluggish, can bridge wide gaps. Tends to liquate. Combined brazing/heat treatment at above 925 °C improves fluidity of the alloy. Can be used in protective atmosphere (e.g. hydrogen-nitrogen) or in vacuum for fluxless brazing. Used in food handling and surgical equipment. Used in joints requiring higher corrosion resistance than alternative alloys offer. Used in vacuum applications. White color. High strength, low vapor pressure.	28.5		63											2.5		6					
Ag_{71.15}Cu_{28.1}Ni_{0.75}	Ag–Cu	780/795	–	Nicusil 3. Better strength and wetting than BAg-8.	28.1		71.15											0.75							
Ag_{75}Cu_{22}Zn_{3}	Ag–Cu–Zn	740/790	–	Braze 750. For silverware. For step brazing. For enameling; low zinc content causes very little change in brilliance of the enamel. Corrosion-resistant. Remelt temperature altered by dissolving base metal; increased by silver, decreased by copper. For iron or nickel alloys. Silver-white color; used in silversmithing due to color match. Low zinc content minimizes zinc evaporation, especially in controlled atmospheres during fluxless brazing.	22	3	75																		
Ag_{50}Cu_{34}Zn_{16}	Ag–Cu–Zn	675/775; 677/774	–	BAg-6, Braze 501, Braze 502, Braze 503, Silvaloy A50, Silver Braze 50. For steam turbine blades. For thickly galvanized steel, aluminium and brass tubing. Widely used in electrical industry. Used in dairy industry. Broad melting range, can form fillets and bridge large gaps.	34	16	50																		
Ag_{50}Cu_{17}Zn_{33}	Ag–Cu–Zn	780/870	–	BAg-6b, BVAg-6b, Braze 502, Braze 503 (VTG grade for vacuum systems, with reduced volatile impurities). For nonferrous alloys. High electrical and thermal conductivity. Higher gap-filling capability than corresponding BAg-8. (DUBIOUS, see the other BAg-6b entry)	17	33	50																		
Ag_{50}Cu_{50}	Ag–Cu	779/870	–	BVAg-6b, Braze 503. Vacuum-grade. For electronics where cadmium and zinc have to be avoided.	50		50																		
Ag_{61.5}Cu_{24}In_{14.5}	Ag–Cu	625/705	–	BAg-29, BVAg-29, Premabraze 616, Incusil 15. Vacuum grade. For ferrous and nonferrous alloys in moderate temperature vacuum systems. Slightly sluggish. Tends to liquate. Can be used without flux in hydrogen, inert gas, or vacuum. Indium improves wetting of ferrous alloys. Silver-white color. Lowest melting point from ductile low-vapor pressure alloys.	24		61.5																		In_{14.5}
Ag_{63}Cu_{27}In_{10}	Ag–Cu	685/730	–	Premabraze 631, Incusil 10. Low vapor pressure. For ferrous and nonferrous alloys.	27		63																		In_{10}
Ag_{65}Cu_{20}Zn_{15}	Ag–Cu–Zn	850/900	–	PD 103.	20	15	65																		
Ag_{55}Cu_{21}Zn_{22}Sn_{2}	Ag–Cu–Zn	630/660	–	AG 103, L-Ag55Sn, BrazeTec 5507. For brazing steels, copper and its alloys, nickel and its alloys. Good alternative to cadmium-containing brazes. Good wicking. Can be used for induction brazing and flame brazing. Used in electrotechnics, automotive industry and in toolmaking.	21	22	55													2					
Ag_{45}Cu_{27.75}Zn_{25}Sn_{2.25}	Ag–Cu–Zn	640/680	–	AG 104, L-Ag45Sn, Ag 2, BrazeTec 4576. Low-temperature, free-flowing. Used in plumbing. For brazing steels, copper and its alloys, nickel and its alloys. Good alternative to cadmium-containing brazes. Good wicking. Can be used for induction brazing and flame brazing. Used in construction industry, electrotechnics and automotive industry.	27.75	25	45													2.25					
Ag_{45}Cu_{27}Zn_{25}Sn_{3}	Ag–Cu–Zn	640/680; 646/677	–	BAg-36, Braze 452, Silvaloy A45T, Matti-sil 453, Silver Braze 45T. Low-temperature, free-flowing. General-purpose. Good substitute of cadmium-containing alloys. Narrow melt range, suitable for manual or machine feeding to the joint. Good for narrow gaps. Gap 0.025–0.15 mm. Pale yellow color. Similar to AG 104. Maximum service temperature 204 °C, intermittently 316 °C. For improved corrosion resistance on stainless steel, use a nickel-containing alloy instead, e.g. BAg-24.	27	25	45													3					
Ag_{45}Cu_{25}Zn_{26.8}Sn_{3}Si_{0.2}	Ag–Cu–Zn	643/671	–	Matti-sil 453S. Similar to BAg-36, addition of silicon promotes flow and produces smoother fillets.	25	26.8	45													3			0.2		
Ag_{40}Cu_{30}Zn_{28}Ni_{2}	Ag–Cu–Zn	660/780	–	BAg-4, Braze 403, Argo-braze 40N, Silver Braze 40Ni2. Slow flow. For tungsten carbides. For stainless steel food handling equipment. Economical alloy for brazing tungsten carbide tool tips to stainless steels. For brazing stainless steel, mild steel, cast iron, malleable iron, and many nonferrous alloys. Particularly good for stainless steel containers and equipment for food handling. Tends to liquate. Gap 0.1–0.25 mm. Light yellow color.	30	28	40											2							
Ag_{40}Cu_{30}Zn_{25}Ni_{5}	Ag–Cu–Zn	660/860	–	Braze 404. For tungsten carbides. For stainless steel.	30	25	40											5							
Ag_{40}Cu_{30}Zn_{28}Sn_{2}	Ag–Cu–Zn	650/710	–	BAg-28, AG 105, L-Ag40Sn, Ag 3, Braze 402, Silvaloy A40T, Matti-sil 40Sn, BrazeTec 4076, Silver Braze 40Sn2. Free-flowing. Gap-filling. Often chosen for its low temperature, good wetting and good flow. Suitable for torch brazing with manual feed, where heating may be inconsistent. For steel, copper and copper alloys, nickel and nickel alloys; for joining ferrous, nonferrous and dissimilar alloys with narrow tolerances. General-purpose, often used in refrigeration work. Used in plumbing. Best suited for narrow-gap joints. Maximum service temperature 204 °C, intermittently 316 °C. Gap 0.075–0.2 mm. Pale yellow color. Good alternative to cadmium-containing brazes. Good wicking. Can be used for induction brazing and flame brazing. Used in construction industry, electrotechnics and automotive industry.	30	28	40													2					
Ag_{34}Cu_{36}Zn_{27.5}Sn_{2.5}	Ag–Cu–Zn	630/730	–	AG 106, L-Ag34Sn, Silvaloy A34T, BrazeTec 3476. Tin provides good wetting of difficult metals, e.g. tungsten carbide and stainless steel. For copper and its alloys, nickel and its alloys, and ferrous alloys. Absence of lead and cadmium allows use of long heating cycles. Can be used for controlled atmosphere fluxless brazing. Mostly used for furnace brazing. Pale yellow color. Maximum service temperature 204 °C, intermittently 316 °C. Good alternative to cadmium-containing brazes. Good wicking. Can be used for induction brazing and flame brazing. Used in electrotechnics and automotive industry.	36	27.5	34													2.5					
Ag_{30}Cu_{36}Zn_{32}Sn_{2}	Ag–Cu–Zn	665/755	–	AG 107, L-Ag30Sn, BrazeTec 3076. For brazing steels, copper and its alloys, nickel and its alloys. Good alternative to cadmium-containing brazes. Good wicking. Can be used for induction brazing and flame brazing. Used in electrotechnics and automotive industry.	36	32	30													2					
Ag_{25}Cu_{40}Zn_{33}Sn_{2}	Ag–Cu–Zn	680/760; 690/780	–	BAg-37, AG 108, Braze 255, L-Ag25Sn, BrazeTec 2576, Silver Braze 25Sn2. Economical. For ferrous and non-ferrous alloys. For joints not requiring high impact strength nor high ductility. For brazing steels, copper and its alloys, nickel and its alloys. Good alternative to cadmium-containing brazes. Good wicking. Can be used for induction brazing and flame brazing. Used in electrotechnics and automotive industry.	40	33	25													2					
Ag_{24}Cu_{43}Zn_{33}	Ag–Cu–Zn	688/810	–	Silvaloy A24. Lower-silver modification of BAg-20; higher melting temperature provides higher mechanical strength at elevated temperatures. For copper, brass, silver, nickel and ferrous alloys. Often used for ferrous, non-ferrous and dissimilar metals with close tolerances. Light yellow color. Maximum service temperature 260 °C, intermittently 371 °C.	43	33	24																		
Ag_{56}Cu_{19}Zn_{17}Sn_{5}Ga_{3}	Ag–Cu–Zn	608/630	–	BrazeTec 5662. For brazing steels, copper and its alloys, nickel and its alloys, high speed steels, diamond, tungsten carbide. Good alternative to cadmium-containing brazes. Good wicking, very low melting point.	19	17	56													5					Ga_{3}
Ag_{63}Cu_{24}Zn_{13}	Ag–Cu–Zn	690/730	–	AG 201	24	13	63																		
Ag_{60}Cu_{26}Zn_{14}	Ag–Cu–Zn	695/730	–	AG 202	26	14	60																		
Ag_{44}Cu_{30}Zn_{26}	Ag–Cu–Zn	675/735	–	AG 203, L-Ag44, BrazeTec 4404. For brazing steels, copper and its alloys, nickel and its alloys. Good alternative to cadmium-containing brazes. Good wicking. Can be used for induction brazing and flame brazing. Used in electrotechnics and installations.	30	26	44																		
Ag_{30}Cu_{38}Zn_{32}	Ag–Cu–Zn	680/765; 695/770; 677/766; 675/765	–	BAg-20, AG 204, L-Ag30, Ag 4, Braze 300, Silvaloy A30, Matti-sil 30, BrazeTec 3075, Silver Braze 30. Used in plumbing. For steel and nonferrous alloys with melting point above 790 °C. For nickel silver knife handles. For electrical equipment. Gap-filling; wide melting range allows producing fillets. For assemblies that come in contact with food and dairy. General purpose braze extensively used for joining copper, brass, bronze, nickel-silver, steel and nonferrous alloys. Suitable for dip-brazing of wires in electronics; the flow point matches melting point of borax, which is used as a flux to cover the surface of the molten metal in the pot. Light yellow color. Maximum service temperature 204 °C, intermittently 316 °C.	38	32	30																		
Ag_{35}Cu_{32}Zn_{33}	Ag–Cu–Zn	685/755	–	BAg-35, Braze 351, Silvaloy A35, Silver Braze 35. Good general purpose alloy. Can be used in food industry. For ferrous and non-ferrous alloys. Used in electrical industry and for brazing parts of ships, lamps, piping, band instruments, etc. Yellow white color. Maximum service temperature 204 °C, intermittently 316 °C.	32	33	35																		
Ag_{25}Cu_{40}Zn_{35}	Ag–Cu–Zn	700/790	–	AG 205, L-Ag 25, BrazeTec 2500. For brazing steels, copper and its alloys, nickel and its alloys. Good alternative to cadmium-containing brazes. Good wicking. Can be used for induction brazing and flame brazing. Used in electrotechnics and automotive industry.	40	35	25																		
Ag_{20}Cu_{44}Zn_{36}Si_{0.05–0.25}	Ag–Cu–Zn	690/810	–	AG 206, L-Ag 20, BrazeTec 2009. For brazing steels, copper and its alloys, nickel and its alloys. Good alternative to cadmium-containing brazes. Good wicking. Can be used for induction brazing and flame brazing. Used in electrotechnics and automotive industry.	44	36	20																0.25		
Ag_{12}Cu_{48}Zn_{40}Si_{0.05–0.25}	Ag–Cu–Zn	800/830	–	AG 207	48	40	12																0.25		
Ag_{5}Cu_{55}Zn_{40}Si_{0.05–0.25}	Ag–Cu–Zn	820/870	–	AG 208	55	40	5																0.25		
Ag_{50}Cu_{15}Zn_{16}Cd_{19}	Ag–Cu–Zn	620/640	Cd	AG 301	15	16	50												19						
Ag_{45}Cu_{15}Zn_{16}Cd_{24}	Ag–Cu–Zn	605/620; 607/618	Cd	BAg-1, AMS 4769, AG 302, Easy-Flo 45, Mattibraze 45. Very ductile, good flow properties. High-strength. For ferrous, nonferrous and dissimilar alloys. For close joint clearances. Lowest melting point of Ag–Cu–Zn-Cd alloys. Suitable for most metals, e.g. steel, stainless steel, copper, nickel and their alloys. Unsuitable for aluminium and magnesium. Narrow melting range, good capillary flow. Wide acceptance by industrial users. Light yellow color. Maximum service temperature 204 °C (intermittently 316 °C).	15	16	45												24						
Ag_{50}Cu_{15.5}Zn_{16.5}Cd_{18}	Ag–Cu–Zn	625/635	Cd	BAg-1a, AMS 4770, Easy-Flo, Easy-Flo 50, Silvaloy 50, Mattibraze 50, Silver Alloy 50. Near-eutectic. Same applications as BAg-1. Suitable for most metals, e.g. steel, stainless steel, copper, nickel and their alloys. Unsuitable for aluminium and magnesium. For ferrous, nonferrous and dissimilar alloys. Narrow melting range, no liquation. High fluidity, for close joint clearances. Very free-flowing, used where minimum brazing temperatures are required. When brazing cast iron, graphite must be removed from the surface to assure good wetting. May facilitate stress cracking of some alloys by liquid metal embrittlement; prior stress relief annealing is required then, or use of a higher melting point alloy that does not melt until stress relief temperature of the base metal is reached. Light yellow color. Maximum service temperature 204 °C (intermittently 316 °C).	15.5	16.5	50												18						
Ag_{30}Cu_{27}Zn_{23}Cd_{20}	Ag–Cu–Zn	605/710; 608/710; 605/745	Cd	BAg-2a, Easy-Flo 30, Silvaloy 30, Mattibraze 30, Silver Alloy 30. Similar to BAg-2, more economical. For ferrous, nonferrous and dissimilar alloys. For larger gaps, where fillets are desired. For steel, stainless steel, copper, copper alloys, nickel, nickel alloys, and combinations. For larger gaps, where fillets are desired and clearances are not uniform. Light yellow color. Maximum service temperature 204 °C, intermittently 316 °C.	27	23	30												20						
Ag_{25}Cu_{35}Zn_{26.5}Cd_{13.5}	Ag–Cu–Zn	605/745	Cd	BAg-27, Easy-Flo 25, Silvaloy 25. Similar to BAg-2a, more economical due to lower silver content; higher melting point and melting range results. For steel, stainless steel, copper, copper alloys, nickel, nickel alloys, and combinations. Melts through mushy state. For larger gaps, where fillets are desired and clearances are not uniform. Light yellow color. Maximum service temperature 204 °C, intermittently 316 °C.	35	26.5	25												13.5						
Ag_{25}Cu_{40}Zn_{33}Sn_{2}	Ag–Cu–Zn	685/771	–	BAg-37, Silvaloy A25T, Silver Braze 25Sn2. Similar to BAg-28, more economical due to lower silver content; less-active flow, higher melting point, higher melting range. For ferrous and nonferrous alloys. For joints not requiring ductility and impact strength. Not ductile during cooling, must be allowed to cool without mechanical and thermal shocks.	40	33	25													2					
Ag_{42}Cu_{17}Zn_{16}Cd_{25}	Ag–Cu–Zn	610/620	Cd	AG 303	17	16	42												25						
Ag_{40}Cu_{19}Zn_{21}Cd_{20}	Ag–Cu–Zn	595/630	Cd	AG 304	19	21	40												20						
Ag_{35}Cu_{26}Zn_{21}Cd_{18}	Ag–Cu–Zn	610/700; 605/700; 607/701	Cd	BAg-2, AMS 4768, AG 305, Easy-Flo 35, Silvaloy 35, Mattibraze 35, Silver Alloy 35. Similar to BAg-1, more economical. For ferrous, nonferrous and dissimilar alloys. Free-flowing, for larger gaps, where fillets are desired. For steel, stainless steel, copper, copper alloys, nickel, nickel alloys, and combinations. Light yellow color. Maximum service temperature 204 °C, intermittently 316 °C.	26	21	35												18						
Ag_{30}Cu_{28}Zn_{21}Cd_{21}	Ag–Cu–Zn	600/690	Cd	AG 306	28	21	30												21						
Ag_{25}Cu_{30}Zn_{27.5}Cd_{17.5}	Ag–Cu–Zn	605/720; 640/715	Cd	BAg-33, AG 307, Easy-Flo 25HC. Similar to BAg-2a, more economical. For ferrous, nonferrous and dissimilar alloys. For larger gaps, where fillets are desired.	30	27.5	25												17.5						
Ag_{21}Cu_{35.5}Zn_{26.5}Cd_{16.5}Si_{0.5}	Ag–Cu–Zn	610/750	Cd	AG 308	35.5	26.5	21												16.5				0.5		
Ag_{20}Cu_{40}Zn_{25}Cd_{15}	Ag–Cu–Zn	605/765	Cd	AG 309	40	25	20												15						
Ag_{50}Cu_{15.5}Zn_{15.5}Cd_{16}Ni_{3}	Ag–Cu–Zn	635/655; 630/690; 632/688	Cd	BAg-3, AMS 4771, AG 351, Easy-Flo 3, Silvaloy 50N, Mattibraze 50N, Silver Alloy 50Ni3. For 300-series stainless steel. For joining tungsten carbide, beryllium copper and aluminium bronze to steel. Introduced as a replacement of BAg-1a due to its increased corrosion resistance in certain conditions. Resistant to chloride corrosion. Used in marine applications. Used in dairy equipment exposed to strong chlorine-based cleaning solutions. Used extensively for brazing tungsten carbide tips on woodcutting, metal cutting and mining tools. Recommended for aluminium bronze as the nickel content offsets the detrimental effect of aluminium diffusion. Mushy during melting, most volume melts at the higher end of melting range. Can be used to shape fillets and to bridge large gaps. Fillets may be used for bridging large gaps or for distributing stresses in the assembly. Tendency to liquation. Light yellow color. Maximum service temperature 204 °C (intermittently 316 °C). Gap 0.1–0.25 mm. Cadmium-free alternative is BAg-24.	15.5	15.5	50											3	16						
Ag_{44}Cu_{27}Zn_{13}Cd_{15}P_{1}	Ag–Cu–Zn	595/660	Cd	Braze 440. For electrical contacts and copper-tungsten electrodes. Low-melting filler.	27	13	44												15					1	
Cd_{95}Ag_{5}	Cd-Ag	340/395	Cd	Braze 053, Braze 53. A high-temperature solder. For medium-strength joints. Can join copper, brass and steel. Used where joint strength needs to be higher than achievable by solders and temperature must be low, e.g. thermostatic bellows operating at temperatures too high for soft solders and requiring being joined below their annealing temperature. Large use on small electric motors, where soft soldering would fail on overheating. Used for soldering gun parts instead of soft solders due to high resistance to alkali solutions used for blacking, and due to higher strength at high temperatures. Gray color.			5												95						
Cu_{58}Zn_{37}Ag_{5}	Ag–Cu–Zn	840/880	–	Braze 051. For nichrome resistance elements; the brazing temperature allows simultaneous stress relief annealing which prevents intergranular cracking. For brazing and simultaneous heat treatment of steels. For various ferrous and nonferrous alloys. Zinc content and high temperature required causes rapid alloying with nonferrous metals, so the duration of contact with liquid alloy with base metals should be limited. In furnace brazing the heat cycles should be kept short, as otherwise zinc could volatilize and leave pinholes in the alloy. Brass yellow color.	58	37	5																		
Cu_{57}Zn_{38}Mn_{2}Co_{2}	Cu–Zn	890/930	–	F Bronze. For brazing tungsten carbide to steels. Primarily used for rock drills or when simultaneous heat treatment is required.	57	38									2		2								
Cu_{86}Zn_{10}Co_{4}	Cu–Zn	960/1030	–	D Bronze. For brazing tungsten carbide to steels. Primarily used for rock drills or when simultaneous heat treatment is required.	86	10											4								
Cu_{85}Sn_{8}Ag_{7}	Ag–Cu	665/985	–	Braze 071. For vacuum systems. As a lower-temperature alternative to copper. For brazing with following heat treatment.	85		7													8					
Cu_{85}Sn_{15}	Cu-Sn	789/960	–	Cutin.	85															15					
Cu_{60.85}Ag_{36}Si_{3}Sn_{0.15}	Ag–Cu		–	Developed as a replacement for Ag_{72}Cu_{28} eutectic, with half the silver content and correspondingly lower material cost. Very similar mechanical and physical properties and application temperature.	60.85		36													0.15			3		
Cu_{53}Zn_{38}Ag_{9}	Ag–Cu–Zn	765/850	Cd	Braze 090. For copper alloys, e.g. in band instruments. Also for brazing of steels with simultaneous cyanide case hardening.	53	38	9												18						
Cu_{45}Zn_{35}Ag_{20}	Ag–Cu–Zn	710/815; 713/816	–	Braze 202, Silvaloy A20. Has variety of applications but used rarely due to high melting point. Close temperature match for heat treating carbon steel, allows brazing and heat treating in a single step. Strength generally higher than of base metals. Maximum service temperature 149 °C, intermittently 260 °C.	45	35	20																		
Cu_{52.5}Zn_{22.5}Ag_{25}	Ag–Cu–Zn	675/855; 677/857	–	Braze 250. For joining ferrous and non-ferrous alloys. Tends to liquate, rapid heating preferred. Long melting range is advantageous for large gap joints. Special use in jet engine compressors as bearing surface material on rubbing seals. Brass yellow color.	52.5	22.5	25																		
Ag_{72}Cu_{28}	Ag–Cu	780	–	AG 401, BrazeTec 7200. Eutectic. Good ductility, moderate temperature. Widely used. Can be used for brazing metalized ceramics. Can be used for both flame and furnace brazing, with protective atmosphere and vacuum. In vacuum silver may evaporate above 900 °C.	28		72																		
Ag_{60}Cu_{30}Sn_{10}	Ag–Cu	600/730; 600/720; 602/718	–	AG 402, BAg-18, BVAg-18, AMS 4773, Braze 603, Braze 604 (VTG grade for vacuum systems, with reduced volatile impurities), Cusilitin 10, BrazeTec 6009, Silver Braze 60Sn10. For vacuum tube seals, for alloyed steels. Can braze some ferrous and nonferrous alloys without flux. For marine heat exchangers (which come in contact with sea water at elevated temperature, where zinc would tend to leach). Some tendency to liquate. Tin content improves wetting of ferrous alloys. Useful for seals on vacuum tube components and for fluxless brazing in controlled atmosphere. White color. Can be used for both flame and furnace brazing, with protective atmosphere and vacuum. In vacuum silver may evaporate above 900 °C.	30		60													10					
Ag_{56}Cu_{27.25}In_{14.5}Ni_{2.25}	Ag–Cu	600/710	–	AG 403, Ag56InNi. Suitable for brazing parts to be later coated with TiN.	27.25		56											2.25							In_{14.5}
Ag_{64}Cu_{26}In_{6}Mn_{2}Ni_{2}	Ag–Cu	730/780	–	Ag64MnNiIn. Suitable for brazing parts to be later coated with TiN.	26		64								2			2							In_{6}
Ag_{55}Cu_{30}Pd_{10}Ni_{5}	Ag–Cu	827/871	–	Premabraze 550. For corrosion-resistant joints on stainless steel.	30		55		10									5							
Ag_{85}Mn_{15}	Ag	960/970	–	BAg-23, AMS 4766, AG 501, Braze 852, Silver Braze 85. For high-temperature service where good strength is required. For complex chromium-titanium carbides, stainless steel, Stellite, Inconel. For torch and furnace brazing. High melting point advantageous for subsequent heat treatments. Used for carbide tools subjected to high temperatures. White color. Can be used for infiltrating porous components made by powder metallurgy ("infiltration brazing"); the lubricity of silver and its resistance to galling makes it attractive for bearings. Can be strain-hardened by mechanical cold working.			85								15										
Ag_{49}Cu_{16}Zn_{23}Mn_{7.5}Ni_{4.5}	Ag–Cu–Zn	680/705	–	AG 502	16	23	49								7.5			4.5							
Ag_{27}Cu_{38}Zn_{20}Mn_{9.5}Ni_{5.5}	Ag–Cu–Zn	680/830	–	AG 503	38	20	27								9.5			5.5							
Ag_{25}Cu_{38}Zn_{33}Mn_{2}Ni_{2}	Ag–Cu–Zn	710/815	–	BAg-26, Braze 252, Silver Braze 25. Economical. For tungsten carbide, stainless steel, and steels.	38	33	25								2			2							
Ag_{90}Pd_{10}	Ag-Pd	1002/1065; 1025/1070	–	Premabraze 901, Palsil 10. For stainless steels, nickel, molybdenum, tungsten, and fast brazing cycles on titanium.			90		10																
Ag_{48.5}Pd_{22.5}Cu_{19}Ni_{10}	Ag-Pd	910/1179	–	Palnicusil. Economical. Ductile, for stainless steels. Wide gaps.	19		48.5		22.5									10							
Ni_{57.1}Pd_{30}Cr_{10.5}B_{2.4}	Pd–Ni	941/977	–	Palnicro 30. Better high-temperature creep resistance than BAu-4.					30			10.5						57.1				2.4			
Ni_{47}Pd_{47}Si_{6}	Pd–Ni	810/851	–	Palnisi-47. Better high-temperature creep resistance than BAu-4.					47									47					6		
Ni_{50}Pd_{36}Cr_{10.5}B_{3}Si_{0.5}	Pd–Ni	820/960	–	Palnicro-36-M. Better high-temperature creep resistance than BAu-4.					36			10.5						50				3	0.5		
Cu_{62.5}Au_{37.5}	Au–Cu	990/1015; 991/1016	–	BAu-1, Premabraze 399. For copper, nickel, kovar, and molybdenum-manganese metallized ceramics.	62.5			37.5																	
Au_{80}Cu_{20}	Au–Cu	891; 908/910	–	BAu-2, Gold Braze 8020. Eutectic. Loses ductility above 200 F.	20			80																	
Au_{80}Sn_{20}	Au	280	–	Au80, Indalloy 182, Premabraze 800, Orotin. Good wetting, high strength, low creep, high corrosion resistance, high thermal conductivity, high surface tension, zero wetting angle. Limited ductility. Suitable for step soldering. The original flux-less alloy, does not need flux. Used for die attachment and attachment of metal lids to semiconductor packages, e.g. kovar lids to ceramic chip carriers. Coefficient of expansion matching many common materials. Due to zero wetting angle requires pressure to form a void-free joint. Alloy of choice for joining gold-plated and gold-alloy plated surfaces. As some gold dissolves from the surfaces during soldering and moves the composition to non-eutectic state (1% increase of Au content can increase melting point by 30 °C), subsequent desoldering requires higher temperature. Forms a mixture of two brittle intermetallic phases, AuSn and Au_{5}Sn. Brittle. Proper wetting achieved usually by using nickel surfaces with gold layer on top on both sides of the joint. Comprehensively tested through military standard environmental conditioning. Good long-term electrical performance, history of reliability. Low vapor pressure, suitable for vacuum work. Good ductility. Also classified as a solder. Lowest melting point alloy with low vapor pressure.				80												20					
Au_{88}Ge_{12}	Au	356	–	Au88, Indalloy 183, Premabraze 880, Georo. Eutectic. Low ductility. Used for die attachment of some chips. The high temperature may be detrimental to the chips and limits reworkability. Very low vapor pressure.				88																	Ge_{12}
Ag_{90}Ge_{10}	Ag	651/790	–	Low vapor pressure. Copper-free. Much lower thermal conductivity than silver. Low tarnishing due to germanium content; transparent passivation layer of germanium oxide protects against silver sulfide formation. Can be precipitation-hardened. See also Argentium sterling silver.			90																		Ge_{10}
Ag_{82}Pd_{9}Ga_{9}	Ag-Pd	845/880	–	Gapasil 9. Ductile. Corrosion-resistant. For brazing titanium to titanium and titanium to stainless steel.			82		9																Ga_{9}
Cu_{62}Au_{35}Ni_{3}	Au–Cu	974/1029	–	BAu-3, Premabraze 127, Nicoro. For nickel, kovar, stainless steel, molybdenum, and molybdenum-manganese metallized ceramics. Excellent wetting, low base metal erosion.	62			35										3							
Au_{35}Cu_{31.5}Ni_{14}Pd_{10}Mn_{9.5}	Au-Pd	971/1004	–	RI-46. For tungsten carbide and superalloys.	31.5			35	10						9.5			14							
Au_{82}Ni_{18}	Au-Ni	950; 955	–	BAu-4, BVAu-4, AU 105, Premabraze 130, Premabraze 131 (vacuum grade), AMS 4787, Nioro, Gold Braze 8218. Eutectic. Excellent wetting. Ductile. Oxidation resistance exceeds palladium-bearing alloys. High mechanical strength at high temperatures. Nickel gray color. For stainless steel, tungsten, all common iron and nickel refractory alloys, Inconel X, A286, Kovar, and similar alloys. Normally not used for copper or silver-based alloys; flow point close to melting point of silver, and too readily alloys with copper. Low penetration of base metal, suitable for brazing thin parts, e.g. thin-wall tubing or vacuum tubes. Does not produce severe intergranular penetrations characteristic for boron-containing nickel brazing alloys. Extensively used in nuclear industry except in high-neutron flux regions and in contact with liquid sodium or potassium. Oxidation and scaling resistance up to 815 °C. Brazing done in inert atmospheres or vacuum.				82										18							
Au_{82}In_{18}	Au	451/485	–	Au82, Indalloy 178. High-temperature solder, extremely hard, very stiff.				82																	In_{18}
Au_{60}Cu_{37}In_{3}	Au–Cu	860/900	–	Incuro 60. Lower brazing temperature than other Au–Cu.	37			60																	In_{3}
Au_{20}Cu_{68}In_{2}	Au–Cu	975/1025	–	Incuro 20. Cheaper substitute of BAu-3 and other gold-rich gold-copper alloys.	68			20																	In_{2}
Au_{72}Pd_{22}Cr_{6}	Au-Pd	975/1000	–	Croniro. For brazing diamond to stainless steel. Minimizes chromium depletion of base metals. High corrosion resistance.				72	22			6													
Au_{75}Ni_{25}	Au-Ni	950/990	–	AU 106. Oxidation resistance exceeds palladium-bearing alloys. High mechanical strength at high temperatures.				75										25							
Au_{73.8}Ni_{26.2}	Au-Ni	980/1010	–	Nioro-Ni. For loose tolerances with stainless steel and superalloys. Excellent flow.				73.8										26.2							
Au_{81.25}Ni_{18}Ti_{0.75}	Au-Ni	945/960	–	Nioro-Ti. Wets difficult-to-wet metals.				81.25			0.75							18							
Au_{70}Ni_{30}	Au-Ni	960/1050	–	Ductile, oxidation resistant. Flow strength. Excellent wetting.				70										30							
Au_{75}Cu_{20}Ag_{5}	Au–Cu	885/895	–	Premabraze 051, Silcoro 75. Narrow melting range, suitable for step brazing.	20		5	75																	
Au_{80}Cu_{19}Fe_{1}	Au–Cu	905/910	–	AU 101	19			80								1									
Au_{62.5}Cu_{37.5}	Au–Cu	930/940	–	AU 102	37.5			62.5																	
Au_{60}Ag_{20}Cu_{20}	Au–Ag–Cu	835/845	–	Premabraze 408, Silcoro 60. Narrow melting range, good for step brazing.	20		20	60																	
Au_{81.5}Cu_{16.5}Ni_{2}	Au–Cu	955/970	–	Premabraze 409, Nicoro 80. Remains ductile when solid. Low vapor pressure. For copper, nickel, molybdenum-manganese.	16.5			81.5										2							
Au_{50}Cu_{50}	Au–Cu	955/970	–	Premabraze 402. For copper, nickel, kovar, and molybdenum-manganese metallized ceramics.	50			50																	
Au_{37.5}Cu_{62.5}	Au–Cu	980/1000; 985/1005	–	AU 103. For copper, nickel, kovar, and molybdenum-manganese metallized ceramics.	62.5			37.5																	
Au_{35}Cu_{65}	Au–Cu	990/1010	–	Premabraze 407. For copper, nickel, kovar, and molybdenum-manganese metallized ceramics.	65			35																	
Au_{30}Cu_{70}	Au–Cu	995/1020	–	AU 104	70			30																	
Ni_{36}Pd_{34}Au_{30}	Au–Pd–Ni	1135/1166	–	BAu-5, Gold Braze 3034.				30	34									36							
Au_{70}Ni_{22}Pd_{8}	Au–Pd–Ni	1007/1046; 1005/1037	–	BAu-6, AMS 4786, Premabraze 700, Palniro 7. High strength and ductility. For stainless steels and superalloys.				70	8									22							
Au_{50}Pd_{25}Ni_{25}	Au–Pd–Ni	1102/1121	–	BVAu-7, AMS 4784, Premabraze 500, Palniro 1, Gold Braze 5025. High strength, good oxidation resistance. Suitable for joining superalloys. Like Au_{30}Pd_{34}Ni_{36}, lower brazing temperature.				50	25									25							
Au_{30}Pd_{34}Ni_{36}	Au-Pd–Ni	1135/1169	–	AMS 4785, Palniro 4. High-strength. Corrosion-resistant. For superalloys.				30	34									36							
Au_{92}Pd_{8}	Au–Pd	1199/1241	–	BAu-8, BVAu-8, Paloro. Ductilie, nonoxidizable. Wets tungsten, molybdenum, tantalum and superalloys.				92	8																
Au_{25}Cu_{31}Ni_{18}Pd_{15}Mn_{11}	Au–Pd–Ni	1017/1052	–	Palnicurom 25. For tungsten carbide and superalloys.	31			25	15						11			18							
Au_{25}Cu_{37}Ni_{10}Pd_{15}Mn_{13}	Au–Pd–Ni	970/1013	–	Palnicurom 10. For tungsten carbide and superalloys.	37			25	15						13			10							
Ag_{68}Cu_{27}Pd_{5}	Ag–Cu	807/810	–	BVAg-30, Premabraze 680, Palcusil 5, PAL 5. Narrow melting range. For kovar and molybdenum-manganese seals, better wetting here than Cusil.	27		68		5																
Ag_{59}Cu_{31}Pd_{10}	Ag–Cu	824/852	–	BVAg-31, Premabraze 580, Palcusil 10, PAL 10. (Ag_{58}Cu_{32}Pd_{10}?) Excellent for vacuum-tight joints. For brazing nickel, kovar, copper, and molybdenum-manganese.	31		59		10																
Ag_{54}Pd_{25}Ni_{21}	Ag–Pd	899/949; 900/950	–	BAg-32, BVAg-32, Premabraze 540, Palcusil 25, PAL 25. Similar to Au-Ni, cheaper, lower density. Does not embrittle kovar.			54		25									21							
Pd_{65}Co_{35}	Pd	1229/1235	–	BVPd-1, Premabraze 180. Narrow melting range, low erosion of substrates.					65								35								
Ag_{54}Cu_{21}Pd_{25}	Pd	900/950	–	PD 101.	21		54		25																
Ag_{52}Cu_{28}Pd_{20}	Pd	875/900	–	PD 102.	28		52		20																
Ag_{65}Cu_{20}Pd_{15}	Pd	850/900	–	PD 103, Premabraze 265, Palcusil 15. For copper, stainless steel, kovar, and non-manganese/molybdenum metallized ceramics.	20		65		15																
Ag_{67.5}Cu_{22.5}Pd_{10}	Pd	830/860	–	PD 104.	22.5		67.5		10																
Ag_{58.5}Cu_{31.5}Pd_{10}	Pd	825/850	–	PD 105.	31.5		58.5		10																
Ag_{68.5}Cu_{26.5}Pd_{5}	Pd	805/810	–	PD 106.	26.5		68.5		5																
Pd_{60}Ni_{40}	Pd	1235	–	PD 201, Palni. Eutectic. Does not flow well due to high Ni content. Wets tungsten, nickel, stainless steel, superalloys.					60									40							
Ag_{75}Pd_{20}Mn_{5}	Ag–Pd	1000/1120; 1008/1072	–	PD 202, Palmansil 5. For tungsten carbide and superalloys.			75		20						5										
Cu_{82}Pd_{18}	Cu–Pd	1080/1090	–	PD 203	82				18																
Ag_{95}Pd_{5}	Ag–Pd	970/1010	–	PD 204			95		5																
Ag_{95}Al_{5}		780/830	–	Ductile. For titanium alloys.			95														5				
Au_{75.5}Ag_{12.4}Cu_{9.5}Zn_{2.5}Ir_{0.1}		860/882	–	Wieland Porta Optimum 880. Dental solder. Yellow color.	9.5	2.5	12.4	75.5																	Ir_{0.1}
Au_{73}Ag_{12.4}Zn_{14.5}Ir_{0.1}		680/700	–	Wieland Porta Optimum 710. Dental solder. Yellow color.		14.5	12.4	73																	Ir_{0.1}
Au_{73.5}Ag_{25}Zn_{1.5}		960/1010	–	Wieland Bio Porta 1020. Dental solder. Yellow color.		1.5	25	73.5																	
Au_{88.7}Ag_{3}Zn_{6.2}Pt_{2}Ir_{0.1}		830/890	–	Wieland Porta Optimum 900. Dental solder. Yellow color.		6.2	3	88.7		2															Ir_{0.1}
Au_{89}Zn_{5.7}Pt_{5}Ir_{0.3}		850/930	–	Wieland Porta Optimum 940. Dental solder. Yellow color.		5.7		89		5															Ir_{0.3}
Au_{49.7}Ag_{32.5}Zn_{4.5}Pd_{13}Ir_{0.3}		980/1090	–	Wieland Porta-1090W. Dental solder. White color.		4.5	32.5	49.7	13																Ir_{0.3}
Au_{80}Ag_{17.5}Sn_{0.2}In_{0.3}Pt_{1.9}Ir_{0.1}		1015/1055	–	Wieland Porta IP V-1. Dental solder. Yellow color.			17.5	80		1.9										0.2					Ir_{0.1}In_{0.3}
Au_{64}Ag_{34.9}In_{0.6}Pt_{0.4}Ir_{0.1}		1015/1030	–	Wieland Porta IP V-2. Dental solder. Yellow color.			34.9	64		0.5															Ir_{0.1}In_{0.6}
Au_{62}Ag_{17}Cu_{7}Zn_{6}In_{5}Pd_{3}		710/770	–	Wieland Auropal M-1. Dental solder. Yellow color.	7	6	17	62	3																In_{5}
Au_{62}Ag_{22}Cu_{4}Zn_{12}		720/750	–	Wieland Auropal W-2. Dental solder. Yellow color.	4	12	22	62																	
Au_{71.5}Ag_{17.5}Zn_{10}Pt_{1}		750/810	–	Wieland Porta OP M-1. Dental solder. Yellow color.		10	17.5	71.5		1															
Au_{68}Ag_{19}Zn_{12}Pt_{1}		710/765	–	Wieland Porta OP W-2. Dental solder. Yellow color.		12	19	68		1															
Ni_{73.25}Cr_{14}Si_{4.5}B_{3}Fe_{4.5}C_{0.75}	Ni-Cr	980/1060; 977/1038	–	BNi-1, AMS 4775, NI 101, Hi-Temp 720. Relatively aggressive to the base metal. Good flow. Good corrosion characteristics. Limited applications, usually in brazing of heavier sections. Recommended for light stresses at elevated temperatures. Gap 0.05–0.12 mm. When joining martensitic stainless steels, cracks appear in the fillets on cooling (due to volume strain caused by martensitic transition of the base metal) and may reduce fatigue life of the joint; this can be prevented by a time-intensive stress relief heating just above the martensitic transition of the base metal, or by using BNi-1A, a reduced-carbon version, which reduces modulus of the filler alloy enough to prevent crack formation.								14				4.5		73.25				3	4.5		C_{0.75}
Ni_{73.25}Cr_{14}Si_{4.5}B_{3}Fe_{4.5}	Ni–Cr	980/1070; 977/1077	–	BNi-1A, AMS 4776, NI 101A, Hi-Temp 721. <0.06% C. Low-carbon version of BNi-1, used where carbon content of BNi-1 would be detrimental. Low flow, slower than BNi-1. Oxidation-resistant joints. Used in some gas turbine applications. Gaps 0.05-0.15 mm.								14				4.5		73.25				3	4.5		
Ni_{73.25}Cr_{7}Si_{4.5}B_{3}Fe_{3}C_{0.75}	Ni–Cr	970/1000	–	NI 102. Near-eutectic. General purpose alloy. Relatively low-temperature. Good flow at rapid heating rates. Gaps 0.03–0.10 mm.								7				3		73.25				3	4.5		C_{0.75}
Ni_{82.4}Cr_{7}Si_{4.5}Fe_{3}B_{3.1}	Ni–Cr	966/1040; 971/999	–	BNi-2, AMS 4777, Hi-Temp 820. <0.06% C. Good flow, good fillets, low base metal erosion. Widely used. For food-handling components, medical devices, and aircraft parts. For furnace brazing.								7				3		82.4				3.1	4.5		
Ni_{92.5}Si_{4.5}B_{3}	Ni	980/1040; 982/1066	–	BNi-3, AMS 4778, NI 103, Hi-Temp 910. <0.5% Fe, <0.06% C. Relatively fluid, free-flowing. Chromium-free. Limited use in specialized applications. Good for tight and longer joints. Relatively insensitive to furnace atmosphere dryness.														92.5				3	4.5		
Ni_{94.5}Si_{3.5}B_{2}	Ni	970/1000	–	BNi-4, AMS 4779, NI 104, Hi-Temp 930. <1.5% Fe, <0.06% C. More hypoeutectic version of BNi-3. Wider use than BNi-3. Relatively sluggish. Relatively ductile. Often capable of higher loads than other nickel-based metals. Gaps 0.05-0.10 mm. For stainless steels and alloys of cobalt and nickel. Suitable for brazing thin sections in e.g. chemical devices and jet engine parts.														94.5				2	3.5		
Ni_{71}Cr_{19}Si_{10}	Ni–Cr	1080/1135	–	BNi-5, AMS 4782, NI 105. High melting point, lowered only by silicon. Good flow, limited gap-filling. Avoid fillets, these tend to be crack initiators. Avoid larger gaps. Can produce small, tough, very oxidation-resistant joints. Gaps 0.03–0.1 mm.								19						71					10		
Ni_{89}P_{11}	Ni-P	875; 877	–	BNi-6, NI 106, Hi-Temp 932. <0.06% C. Eutectic. Extremely fluid, therefore limited gap-bridging. Good performance in nitrogen-bearing atmospheres. Can be plated from electroless baths. Used for low-stress joints. Not widely used. Can be used for brazing stainless-steel to phosphorus-deoxidized or OFHC copper. Gaps about 0.03 mm. For stainless steels and alloys of cobalt and nickel. Suitable for brazing thin sections in e.g. chemical devices and jet engine parts. Provides high temperature properties and good corrosion resistance with relatively low processing temperatures.														89						11	
Ni_{76}Cr_{14}P_{10}	Ni–Cr–P	890; 888	–	BNi-7, NI 107, Hi-Temp 933. <0.06% C. Eutectic. Chromium-containing version of BNi-6. Originally developed for brazing parts for cores of nuclear reactors. Extended flow at higher temperatures. Good results for low-stress tight joints. Used for e.g. immersion heaters and thermocouple harnesses. Suitable for continuous furnace brazing in dissociated ammonia atmosphere. Gaps below 0.03 mm. Often used for brazing honeycomb structures and thin-walled tubing. Used in nuclear applications due to absence of boron. Chromium content provides improved high temperature properties and better corrosion resistance than BNi-6.								14						76						10	
Ni_{65.5}Si_{7}Cu_{4.5}Mn_{23}	Ni	980/1010	–	NI 108. Specialized use, for very thin sections. Very low diffusion, low interaction with base metal. Manganese volatility requires special handling for vacuum brazing. Gaps below 0.03 mm.	4.5										23			65.5					7		
Ni_{81.5}Cr_{15}B_{3.5}	Ni–Cr	1055	–	NI 109. Eutectic. <1.5% Fe. Good initial penetration. Specialized use in aerospace. Good choice for gap-filling powders.								15						81.5				3.5			
Ni_{62.5}Cr_{11.5}Si_{3.5}B_{2.5}Fe_{3.5}C_{0.5}W_{16}	Ni-Cr-W	970/1105	–	NI 110. Moderate flow. Use in aerospace. Almost always requires tracing. Gaps 0.1–0.25 mm.								11.5		16		3.5		62.5				2.5	3.5		C_{0.5}
Ni_{67.25}Cr_{10.5}Si_{3.8}B_{2.7}Fe_{3.25}C_{0.4}W_{12.1}	Ni-Cr-W	970/1095	–	NI 111. Reduced-tungsten version of NI 110, improved flow. May have better fatigue resistance than other nickel alloys.								10.5		12.1		3.25		67.25				2.7	3.8		C_{0.5}
Ni_{65}Cr_{25}P_{10}	Ni–Cr–P	880/950	–	NI 112. Chromium-rich version of NI 107, similar flow; non-eutectic but penetrates well. Excellent corrosion resistance in many weak electrolytes.								25						65						10	
Co_{67.8}Cr_{19}Si_{8}B_{0.8}C_{0.4}W_{4}	Co–Cr	1120/1150	–	CO 101. Suitable for gas turbine operations. In some cases can withstand temperature excursions above brazing temperature. Suitable for both new and braze-repaired parts.								19		4			67.8					0.8	8		C_{0.4}
Co_{50}Cr_{19}Ni_{17}Si_{8}W_{4}B_{0.8}	Co–Cr	1107/1150	–	BCo-1, AMS 4783.								19		4			50	17				0.8	8		
Au_{100}	pure	1064	–	Pure metal. Very ductile, wets most metals.				100																	
Ag_{100}	pure	962	–	BAg-0, BVAg-0, Braze 999, Pure Silver. Pure metal. VTG alloy. For ceramics for semiconductors. Good mechanical properties, compatible with most metals, low vapor pressure, excellent fluidity when molten. Mostly used for brazing reactive metals, e.g. beryllium and titanium. Does not significantly alloy with nor wet iron. Rarely used alone due to relatively high cost.			100																		
Pd_{100}	pure	1555		Pure metal. High-temperature brazing of refractory metals.					100																
Pt_{100}	pure	1767	–	Very high temperature brazing. For refractory metals for high-temperature applications.						100															
Cu_{100}	pure	1085	–	pure metal; CU 101 (99.90%), CU 102 or CDA 102 (99.95%), CU 103 (99%), CU 104 (99.90%, 0.015–0.040% P), BCu-1 or CDA 110 (99.99%). Free-flowing. Can be used for press fits. For ferrous alloys, nickel alloys and copper-nickel alloys. BVCu-1x is OFHC, vacuum-grade, for furnace brazing of steels, stainless steels and nickel alloys. Oxygen-containing copper is incompatible with hydrogen-containing atmospheres which cause its embrittlement. Cheaper than silver, but requires higher processing temperatures and is oxidation-prone. Used in fluxless vacuum brazing of stainless steels. High fluidity, low base metal erosion, extremely good wetting of steel. Relatively soft, which is beneficial for stress relief but impairs joint strength.	100																				
Ni_{100}	pure		–	Pure metal. Rarely used due to high melting point. Used for joining molybdenum and tungsten for high-temperature applications.														100							
Ti_{100}	pure	1670	–	Pure metal.							100														
Fe_{40}Ni_{38}B_{18}Mo_{4}			–	Amorphous metal. For brazing and soft magnetic applications. Crystallization at 410 °C. Maximum service temperature 125 °C.									4			40		38				18			
Ti_{60}Cu_{20}Ni_{20}		?/950	–	Recommended for brazing titanium alloys; composition similar to many titanium engineering alloys.	20						60							20							
Ti_{54}Cr_{25}V_{21}	active	?/1500	–	High-temperature. Narrow melting range. Excellent wettability of ceramics; penetrates and seals surface pores and cracks, increasing fracture toughness.							54	25													V_{21}
Ti_{91.5}Si_{8.5}			–	High-temperature. Brazing temperature 1400 °C. Can be used for brazing molybdenum.							91.5												8.5		
Ti_{70}V_{30}			–	High-temperature. Brazing temperature 1650 °C. Can be used for brazing molybdenum.							70														V_{30}
V_{65}Nb_{35}			–	High-temperature. Brazing temperature 1870 °C. Can be used for brazing molybdenum.																					V_{65}Nb_{35}
Nb_{97.8}B_{2.2}			–	High-temperature. Can be used for brazing tungsten.																		2.2			Nb_{97.8}
Nb_{80}Ti_{20}			–	High-temperature. Can be used for brazing tungsten.							20														Nb_{80}
Pt_{85}W_{11}B_{4}			–	High-temperature. Joint remelt temperature 2200 °C. Can be used for brazing tungsten.						85				11								4			
W_{75}Os_{25}			–	Very-high-temperature. Requires very intense heating, e.g. electric arc. Can be used for brazing tungsten.										75											Os_{25}
W_{47}Mo_{50}Re_{3}			–	Very-high-temperature. Requires very intense heating, e.g. electric arc. Can be used for brazing tungsten.									50	47											Re_{3}
Mo_{95}Os_{5}			–	Very-high-temperature. Requires very intense heating, e.g. electric arc. Can be used for brazing tungsten.									95												Os_{5}
Ti_{70}Cu_{15}Ni_{15}		902/932	–	For superalloys and engineering ceramics. Available as amorphous foil.	15						70							15							
Ti_{60}Zr_{20}Ni_{20}		848/856	–	For superalloys and engineering ceramics. Available as amorphous foil.							60							20							Zr_{20}
Zr_{83}Ni_{17}		961	–	For brazing titanium alloys. Available as amorphous foil.														17							Zr_{83}
Zr_{56}V_{28}Ti_{16}		1193/1250	–	For brazing titanium alloys. Available as amorphous foil.							16														Zr_{56}V_{28}
Ag_{57}Cu_{38}Ti_{5}	active	775/790	–	Active alloy. Can be used for brazing ceramics, e.g. silicon nitride. Titanium forms an interfacial layer with Si_{3}N_{4}, yielding TiN, TiSi, and Ti_{5}Si_{3}. For brazing engineering ceramics. Available as amorphous foil.	38		57				5														
Ag_{68.8}Cu_{26.7}Ti_{4.5}	active	780/900	–	Ticusil. Active alloy. Can be used for brazing ceramics, e.g. silicon nitride. Titanium forms an interfacial layer with Si_{3}N_{4}, yielding TiN, TiSi, and Ti_{5}Si_{3}. For brazing engineering ceramics. Available as amorphous foil.	26.7		68.8				4.5														
Ag_{72.5}Cu_{19.5}In_{5}Ti_{3}	active	730/760	–	BrazeTec CB1. Active alloy. Can be used for brazing ceramics, metal-ceramics, graphite, diamond, corundum, sapphire, ruby. Needs at least 850 °C for wetting ceramics, higher temperatures improve wetting. For use under argon or vacuum, in vacuum silver may evaporate above 900 °C.	19.5		72.5				3														In_{5}
Ag_{96}Ti_{4}	active	970	–	BrazeTec CB2. Active alloy. Can be used for brazing ceramics, metal-ceramics, graphite, diamond, corundum, sapphire, ruby. Needs at least 850 °C for wetting ceramics, higher temperatures improve wetting. For use under argon or vacuum, in vacuum silver may evaporate above 900 °C.			96				4														
Ag_{70.5}Cu_{26.5}Ti_{3}	active	780/805	–	BrazeTec CB4. Active alloy. Can be used for brazing ceramics, metal-ceramics, graphite, diamond, corundum, sapphire, ruby. Needs at least 850 °C for wetting ceramics, higher temperatures improve wetting. For use under argon or vacuum, in vacuum silver may evaporate above 900 °C.	26.5		70.5				3														
Ag_{64}Cu_{34.2}Ti_{1.8}	active	780/810	–	BrazeTec CB5. Active alloy. Can be used for brazing ceramics, metal-ceramics, graphite, diamond, corundum, sapphire, ruby. Similar to Cusil-ABA. Needs at least 850 °C for wetting ceramics, higher temperatures improve wetting. For use under argon or vacuum, in vacuum silver may evaporate above 900 °C.	34.2		64				1.8														
Ag_{98.4} In_{1.0}Ti_{0.6}	active	948/959	–	BrazeTec CB6. Active alloy. Can be used for brazing silicon nitride. For use under argon or vacuum, in vacuum silver may evaporate.			98.4				0.6														In_{1}
Au_{97.5}Ni_{0.75}V_{1.75}	active	1045/1090	–	Gold-ABA-V.				97.5										0.75							V_{1.75}
Au_{96.4}Ni_{3}Ti_{0.6}	active	1003/1030	–	Gold-ABA.				96.4			0.6							3							
Cu_{92.75}Si_{3}Al_{2}Ti_{2.25}	active	958/1024	–	Copper-ABA.	92.75						2.25										2		3		
Au_{82}Ni_{15.5}V_{1.75}Mo_{0.75}	active	940/960	–	Nioro-ABA.				82					0.75					15.5							V_{1.75}
Ag_{92.75}Cu_{5}Al_{1}Ti_{1.25}	active	860/912	–	Silver-ABA. Hallmark-compliant, specifically tailored to meet sterling silver standard, used in jewellery. Zinc-free. Preforms made by rapid solidification.	5		92.75				1.25										1				
Ag_{63}Cu_{35.25}Ti_{1.75}	active	780/815	–	Cusil-ABA.	35.25		63				1.75														
Ag_{63}Cu_{34.25}Sn_{1}Ti_{1.75}	active	775/805	–	Cusin-1-ABA.	34.25		63				1.75									1					
Ag_{59}Cu_{27.25}In_{12.5}Ti_{1.25}	active	605/715	–	Incusil-ABA.	27.25		59				1.25														In_{12.5}
Ti_{67}Ni_{33}	active	942/980	–	Tini 67.							67							33							
Ti_{70}Cu_{15}Ni_{15}	active	910/960	–	Ticuni.	15						70							15							
Pd_{54}Ni_{38}Si_{8}	Pd	830/875	–	For brazing stainless steels, superalloys, and cemented carbides.					54									38					8		
Ta_{60}W_{30}Zr_{10}	active		–	Can be used for brazing graphite. For use at temperatures up to over 2700 °C.										30											Ta_{60}Zr_{10}
