= Kaufman Bros. =

Defunct American boutique investment bank

- Type: Private company
- Industry: Financial services
- Founded: 1995
- Founder: Craig D. Kaufman (Co-founder)
- Defunct: January 30, 2012
- Fate: Ceased operations
- Headquarters: New York City, United States
- Products: Investment banking, securities trading and brokerage
- Website: www.kbro.com

Kaufman Bros. (KBRO) was an American boutique investment bank focused on the technology, media, and telecommunications and health-care sectors. The company was founded in 1995 and ceased operations on January 30, 2012.

KBRO's businesses included securities underwriting, sales and trading, investment banking, financial advisory services, investment research, and venture capital.

== History ==
The bank was founded in 1995 and came to prominence in the late 1990s as a strong boutique player in the telecommunications space. In 1997, Crain's New York Business listed co-founder Craig D. Kaufman in its "40 Under 40" list.

Research analyst Vik Grover in the wireline and wireless communications services space was ranked in The Wall Street Journal's "Best on the Street" poll in 2000 and 2001, and was a top 10 most-read analyst in North America on First Call Research Direct in 2001 and first quarter 2002. It closed its doors January 30, 2012. The company filed for Chapter 7 bankruptcy in February 2012.
