= Campbell Lutyens =

1988-2026 American independent private equity advisory firm

- Type: Private Ownership
- Industry: Investment banking
- Founded: 1988
- Founder: John Campbell, Richard Lutyens
- Fate: Acquired by Lazard
- Headquarters: London, England, UK
- Products: Fund placement, Secondary Advisory, GP capital advisory
- Number of employees: 300 (January 2026)
- Website: www.campbell-lutyens.com

Campbell Lutyens is an independent private markets / private capital advisory firm exclusively focused on primary fundraising, secondary transactions and GP stakes/GP M&A advisory services in the private equity, private debt, infrastructure and sustainable investing markets.

It comprises a team of over 300 professionals representing over 40 nationalities and has 15 global offices in London, Paris, Munich, New York City, Austin, Chicago, Los Angeles, Nashville, Salt Lake City, Dubai, Melbourne, Hong Kong, Seoul, Singapore, Tokyo.

Campbell Lutyens was founded in 1988 by John Campbell, Richard Lutyens (deceased) and Bill Dacombe.

In April 2026, Campbell Lutyens agreed to be acquired by Lazard for approximately $575 million. The transaction, which was expected to close in the second half of 2026, would combine Campbell Lutyens' private capital advisory business with Lazard's existing private capital advisory business.

== Leadership team ==
Its leadership team includes Andrew Sealey, chairman of the firm since 2024, Gordon Bajnai currently CEO and part of the Management Committee including Gerald Cooper, Marc Dumbbell, Thomas Liaudet, Immanuel Rubin, Sarah Sandstrom and Richard von Gusovius.

== Business Lines ==
The firm operates three main business lines:

- Fundraising for private equity, private debt, private infrastructure and sustainable investing fund managers (as a placement agent). Campbell Lutyens assists private equity firms in raising funds and advises on all stages and aspects of the fundraising process including strategy, documentation and structuring. The firm acts typically for European, US and Asian managers raising funds of between $300 million and $25 billion from institutional investors globally.
- Secondary advisory services for general partners and limited partners with a focus on the secondary market. The firm advises across a wide range of secondary mandates, assisting investors to achieve best value for their portfolio of assets across private equity, private debt and infrastructure. Typically, advisory transaction mandates range in size from $100 million to $5 billion.
- GP Capital Advisory providing advisory services for general partners and Asset Management firms in relation to GP M&A and Minority GP stakes transactions, as well as strategic growth decisions related to their management companies, including general partner financing options.

== Community ==
The firms puts a strong emphasis on charity, having fostered a culture of charitable awareness since its inception. It supports a number of charities worldwide, including the Children's Literacy Charity, Sport dans la Ville, GO Project, Cancer Research UK, The Bowery Mission, Children of the Mekong and City Harvest. In 2010, it co-organised the Marathon of Marathons leveraging the support of the private market community. With Private Equity International, it gathered a team of 230 runners to join 10,000 others and complete the original route from Marathon to Athens.

== See also ==
- Infrastructure
- Private equity
- Private equity secondary market
