= Private placement agent =

Financial intermediary

A private placement agent or placement agent is a firm assisting fund managers in the alternative asset class (e.g., private equity, infrastructure, real estate, hedge funds, and venture capital) and entrepreneurs/private companies (e.g., start-ups and growth capital companies) seeking to raise private financing through a so-called private placement.

== Background ==
The placement agent acts as an intermediary between those seeking to raise money and those who may be interested in investing. They are typically mandated by fund managers. A few placement agents are structured as groups within large investment banking firms, but more frequently as separate boutique investment banks, sometimes captive to an Alternative Asset management group or specialist fund marketer.

Placement agents will often seek to raise capital from a variety of institutional investors (e.g., pension funds, insurance companies, endowments, funds of funds, and sovereign wealth funds) as well as family offices and high-net-worth individuals. Some placement agents have an exclusive focus on a particular type of institutional investor such as US pension advisors for corporate and public pension funds.

Placement agents are most often compensated through fees based on the amount of money raised (success fee) or supported by the fund or company they are actively representing (retainer fee).

Agents are distinguished from underwriters in that the former are only intermediaries.

== Functions ==
Within the context of fund managers, placement agents can serve several functions:

- Raise investor commitments to new private equity funds – which might include targeting specific investors all the way down to a full service (advisory and marketing services).
- Other services such as:
  - Strategic advisory
  - Marketing: creating marketing materials such as investor decks, coordinating roadshows and meetings with investors, answering due diligence questionnaires (DDQs) and request for proposals (RFPs)
  - secondary market sales of investors' private equity funds interests for placement agents with a dedicated secondary market advisory practice

Within the context of private companies, placement agents typically focus on raising the following types of financing:

- Equity financing for start-ups and growth companies
- Mezzanine capital
- Specialist financing such as government loans

== Bibliography ==
- Wilmerding, Alex. Deal Terms ISBN 1-58762-208-4
